= Osaka Aquarium Kaiyukan =

Largest aquarium in Japan

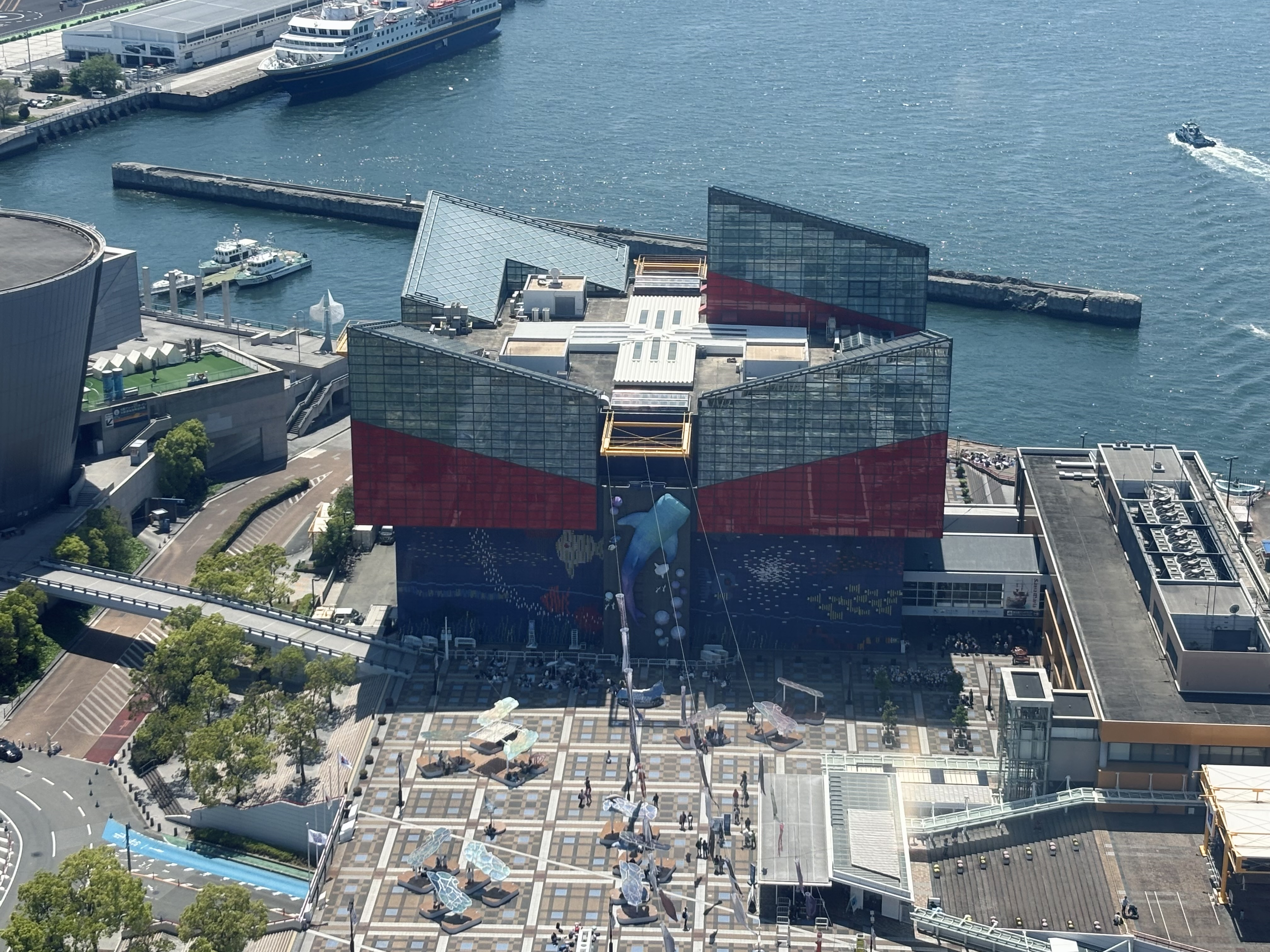
- The Kaiyukan Aquarium
- Interactive map of Osaka Aquarium Kaiyukan
- 34°39′16.1″N 135°25′44.0″E
- Date opened: May 1990
- Location: Osaka, Japan
- Land area: 26,570 m^{2} (286,000 sq ft)
- No. of animals: 29,000
- No. of species: 420
- Volume of largest tank: 5,400,000 litres (1,427,000 US gal)
- Total volume of tanks: 11,000,000 litres (2,906,000 US gal)
- Annual visitors: 2.5 million+
- Memberships: JAZA
- Major exhibits: The Pacific Ocean tank etc.
- Management: kaiyukan company
- Public transit: Chūō Line at Osakako (Osaka Metro)
- Website: www.kaiyukan.com/language/eng/

The Osaka Aquarium Kaiyukan (海遊館, Kaiyūkan; known as the Kaiyukan) is an aquarium located in the ward of Minato in Osaka, Osaka Prefecture, Japan, near Osaka Bay. When it opened in 1990, it was the largest public aquarium in the world.

The aquarium is a member of the Japanese Association of Zoos and Aquariums and is accredited as a Museum-equivalent facilities by the Museum Act from Ministry of Education, Culture, Sports, Science and Technology.

The aquarium is about a five-minute walk from Osakako Station on the Osaka Municipal Subway Chūō Line, and is next to the Tempozan Ferris Wheel.

== History ==
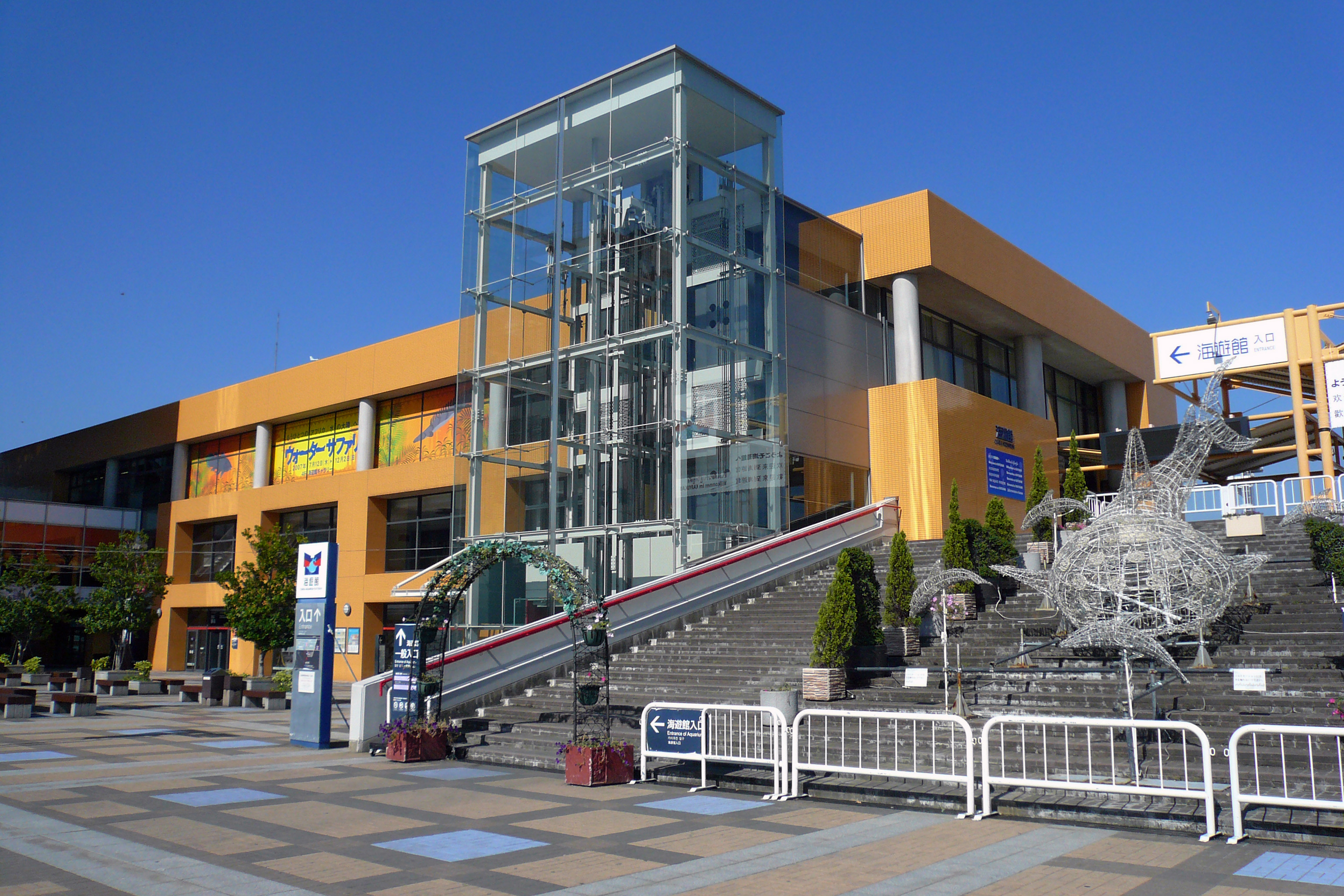
Entrance

In 1988, with the aim of redeveloping the Osaka Bay area, the Kaiyukan and Tempozan Marketplace were to be built following the success stories of aquariums and commercial facilities overseas. The aquarium was named Osaka Aquarium Kaiyukan by the general public and opened in 1990. The number of visitors reached 1 million on the 40th day after opening and 2 million on the 101st day, the final number of visitors during the year reached 5.6 million, surpassing the national record held at that time Tokyo Sea Life Park and being the fastest record in Japan.

The number of visitors reached 50 million on February 26, 2008. Achievement in 6317 days (about 18 years) is the fastest among aquariums in Japan, and about 60% of the visitors are repeaters. In 2014, the total number of visitors exceeded 65 million. This record was the best in Japan, surpassing that of Toba Aquarium.

In 2017, the number of visitors reached 75 million, making it the most visited aquarium in Japan. A ceremony was held in 2024 to celebrate the achievement of 85 million total visitors.

== Exhibits ==
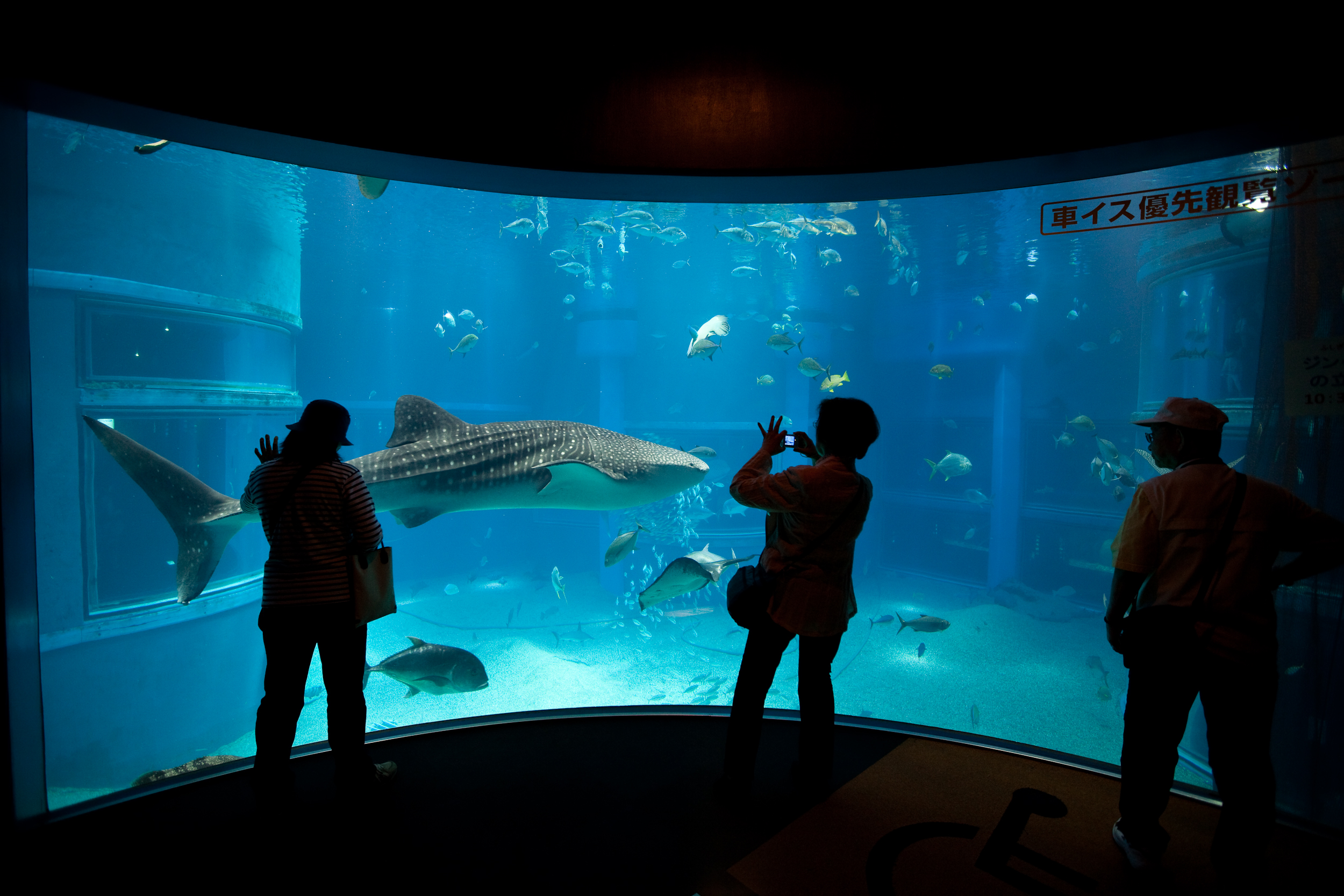
The Pacific Ocean tank

Visitors go up to the eighth floor on the escalator, passing through the Aqua Gate, a tunnel tank housing various tropical fish species. After exiting the escalator, visitors enter the Japan Forest, which recreates a Japanese forest and houses Asian small-clawed otters, Japanese giant salamanders, black-crowned night herons and many other native freshwater animals.

The walk-through aquarium displays marine life in several habitats comprising 27 tanks in 16 main exhibits with a total volume of 10,941 tons of water. The habitats are from the Ring of Fire area of the Pacific Ocean, including the Aleutian Islands (tufted puffins), Monterey Bay (California sea lions and Spotted seals), Gulf of Panama (South American coatis & long-spine porcupinefish), Ecuador Rain Forest (arapaima, red-bellied piranhas, capybaras & green iguanas), Antarctica (penguins), Tasman Sea (Pacific white-sided dolphins) and Great Barrier Reef (palette surgeonfish, pennant coralfish & threadfin butterflyfish), Seto Inland Sea (common octopuses, Japanese spiny lobsters & red seabreams), Coast of Chile (Japanese anchovies and South American pilchards), Cook Sea Strait (loggerhead sea turtles, deepwater burrfish & scarlet wrasse), Japan Deeps (Japanese spider crabs, Australian ghostsharks & Hilgendorf's saucords) and a jellyfish gallery (moon jellyfish & northern sea nettles). The Aqua Gate at the entrance and the Jellyfish corner are recent facilities built in 1998.

The largest tank is the Pacific Ocean tank which has a maximum length of 34 metres (112 ft), a depth of 9 metres (30 ft) and holds 5,400 cubic metres (190,699 cu ft) of water and a variety of fish including Indian mackerel, Pacific bluefin tuna, reef manta rays, scalloped hammerhead sharks and two whale sharks.

The most popular animals are the whale sharks. Osaka aquarium is the second aquarium in the world after Okinawa Ocean Expo Aquarium to start keeping whale sharks. In 1994, the aquarium successfully housed a manta ray in captivity, which was the second in the world at the time. The following year, the aquarium was one of the few to house an ocean sunfish. Due to its comically large size and shape, it is reported to be a more popular exhibit at the aquarium than the whale sharks.

The "New Interactive Area" opened in 2013, and allows visitors to see the animals up close and, in some cases, touch them. In this area, three zones were constructed, the Arctic Zone, in which visitors see ringed seals, the Falkland Islands Zone, where they can see southern rockhopper penguins, and the Maldives Zone, in which they can directly touch stingrays and small sharks like brownbanded bamboo sharks and coral catsharks.

In 2020, the museum shop was reopened on February 22, after renewal work was carried out to coincide with the 30th anniversary of its opening. The music used at Kaiyukan changes with the time of day, but these are all from the "Acoustic Cafe Underwater Walk" album.

=== Aqua Gate ===
- Barhead spinefoot
- Blotched foxface
- Bluespine unicornfish
- Horn-nosed boxfish
- Orangespine unicornfish
- Orbicular batfish
- Sailfin tang
- Silver moony
- Soldierfish

=== Japan Forest ===
- Asian small-clawed otter
- Ayu sweetfish
- Black-crowned night heron
- Dark chub
- Japanese freshwater crab
- Mandarin duck
- Pale chub
- Red-spotted masu salmon

=== Aleutian Islands ===
- Tufted puffin

=== Monterey Bay ===
- California sea lion
- Largha seal

=== Gulf of Panama ===
- Blotcheye soldierfish
- Common bluestripe snapper
- Long-spine porcupinefish
- Longnose butterflyfish
- Scrawled filefish
- South American coati
- Spotfin burrfish
- Tete sea catfish
- White-spotted puffer
- Yellow-brown wrasse

=== Ecuador rainforest ===
- Arowana
- Barred sorubim
- Blackline penguinfish
- Freshwater angelfish
- Piracuru
- Pirapitinga
- Red-bellied piranha
- Redtail catfish
- South American river turtle

=== Antarctica ===
- Adélie penguin
- Gentoo penguin
- King penguin

=== Tasman Sea ===
- Pacific white-sided dolphin

=== Great Barrier Reef ===
- Barrier Reef chromis
- Black butterflyfish
- Blackback butterflyfish
- Blue-green damselfish
- Dot dash butterflyfish
- Elegant firefish
- Manybar goatfish
- Moorish idol
- Orange-band surgeonfish
- Ornate spiny lobster
- Palette surgeonfish
- Razorfish
- Redbelly yellowtail fusilier
- Reticulate dascyllus
- Scribbled angelfish
- Sea goldie
- Semicircled angelfish
- Spotted moray eel
- Threadfin butterflyfish
- Whitecheek surgeonfish

=== Pacific Ocean ===
- Banded houndshark
- Bigeye trevally
- Blacktip reef shark
- tope shark
- Bluefin trevally
- Longtooth grouper
- Japanese wobbegong
- Bluestreak cleaner wrasse
- Scalloped hammerhead
- Bowmouth guitarfish
- Giant grouper
- Flapnose ray
- Ocean sunfish
- Giant trevally
- Honeycomb stingray
- Humpback red snapper
- Indian mackerel
- Japanese bullhead shark
- Japanese jack mackerel
- Live sharksucker
- Longtooth grouper
- Malabar grouper
- Pink whipray
- Rainbow runner
- Reef manta ray
- Round ribbontail ray
- Sand tiger shark
- Sharpnose stingray
- Short-tail stingray
- Smallspotted dart
- Snubnose pompano
- Spangled emperor
- Spotted eagle ray
- Striped bonito
- Whale shark
- Whitetip reef shark
- Zebra shark

=== Seto Inland Sea ===
- Areolate grouper
- Asian sheephead wrasse
- Barred knifejaw
- Blackfin seabass
- Blacktip grouper
- Brassy chub
- Chicken grunt
- Comet grouper
- Common octopus
- Goldlined seabream
- Grey large-eye bream
- Japanese amberjack
- Japanese sea bass
- Japanese spiny lobster
- Kidako moray
- Long barbeled grunter
- Olive flounder
- Red seabream
- Spiny red gurnard
- Stripey
- Thread-sail filefish
- Yellowfin seabream

=== Coast of Chile ===
- Japanese anchovy
- Japanese sardine

=== Cook Strait ===
- Blue maomao
- Butterfly perch
- Deepwater burrfish
- Eastern nannygai
- Green sea turtle
- New Zealand demoiselle
- Red moki
- Scarlet wrasse

=== Japan Deep ===
- Big roughy
- Hilgendorf's saucord
- Japanese armorhead
- Japanese codling
- Japanese spider crab
- Longspine snipefish
- Mandarin dogfish
- Splendid alfonsino
- Sunrise perch

=== Jellyfish ===
- Bay nettle
- Flower hat jelly
- Japanese sea nettle
- Mikado comb jelly
- Moon jelly
- Pacific sea nettle
- Spotted jelly

=== Arctic Region ===
- Arctic char
- Clione
- Lumpfish
- Ringed seal

=== Falkland Islands ===
- Southern rockhopper penguin

=== Gyugyutto Cute ===
- Banded coral shrimp
- Blood red fire shrimp
- Clown anemonefish
- Harlequin shrimp
- Splendid garden eel
- Spotted garden eel

== Research and conservation ==
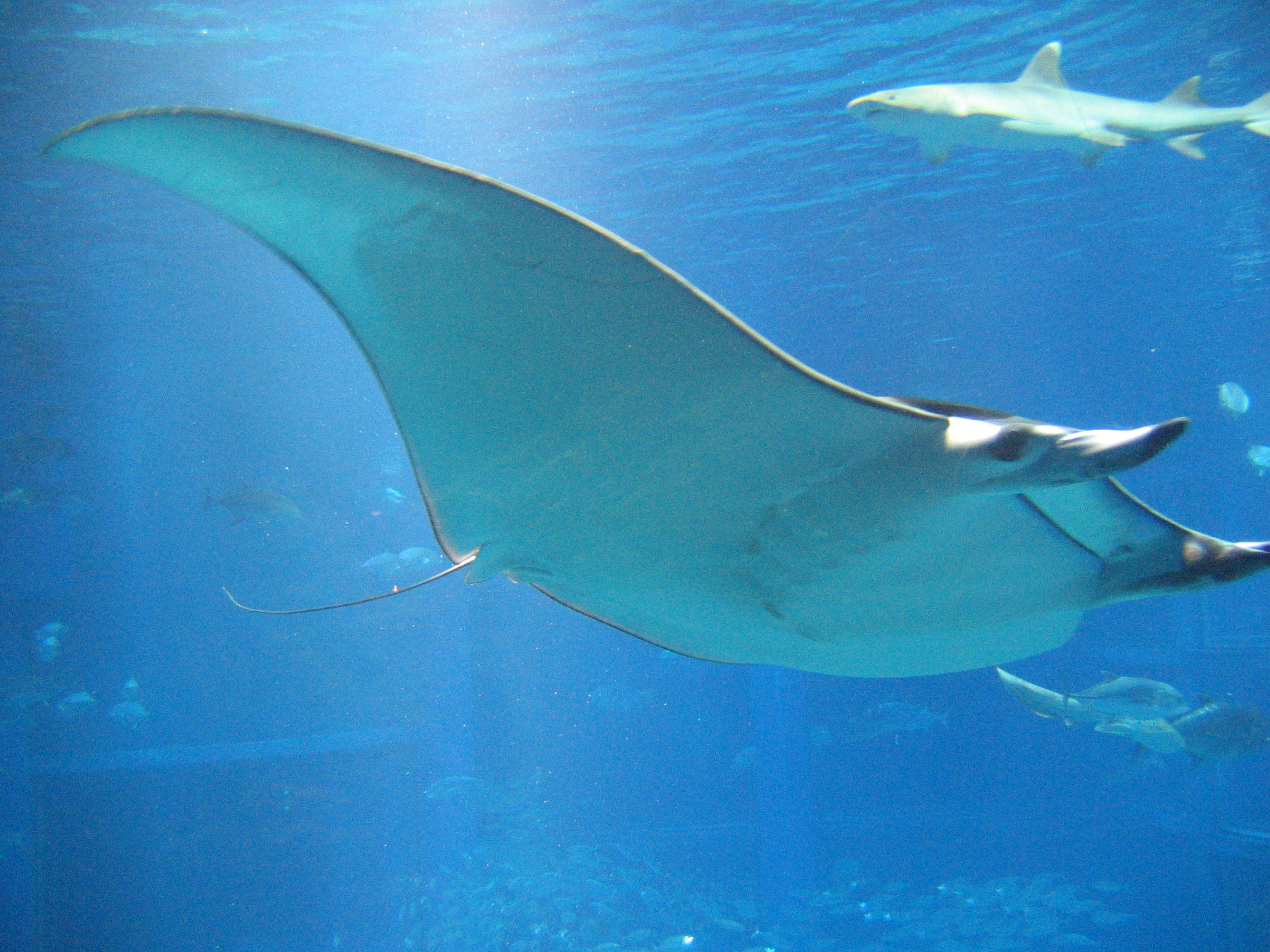
Giant devil ray. Formerly known as Spinetail mobula.

Osaka Aquarium are focusing on research on sharks and rays. By 2016, Kaiyukan had successfully captivity or breeding 47 species of sharks, 37 species of rays, and 1 species of ghost shark, for a total of 85 species. In addition, the past eight surveys of tagging whale sharks have revealed that they can migrate to the Philippines and dive to a depth of 1,500 m (4,900 ft).

The aquarium has been breeding and studying giant devil rays since 2008. "OBIC" devil rays were trained for health management for transportation to the Pacific Tank, and a large 8-meter-diameter tank was set up on the deck of the ship, The giant devil rays were transported over a long distance from Kochi Prefecture to Osaka under conditions that allowed them to swim freely.

At the aquarium, giant devil rays became pregnant in 2022. It was the first time in the world that a giant devil ray was conceived in captivity. After the pregnancy was discovered, regular ultrasound examinations were used to check the growth of the fetus and to record changes in the mother's abdomen bulge and behavior. In addition, to protect the pups after birth, a partition net was set up in the tank in preparation for the birth.

Pups were born on the morning of May 16, and although the birth was celebrated with great fanfare, the pups swam unsteadily and weakly, and died at 16:18. Based on the results of the pathological autopsy and blood tests, the cause of death was considered to be due to an imbalance of blood due to physical exhaustion from not being able to swim.

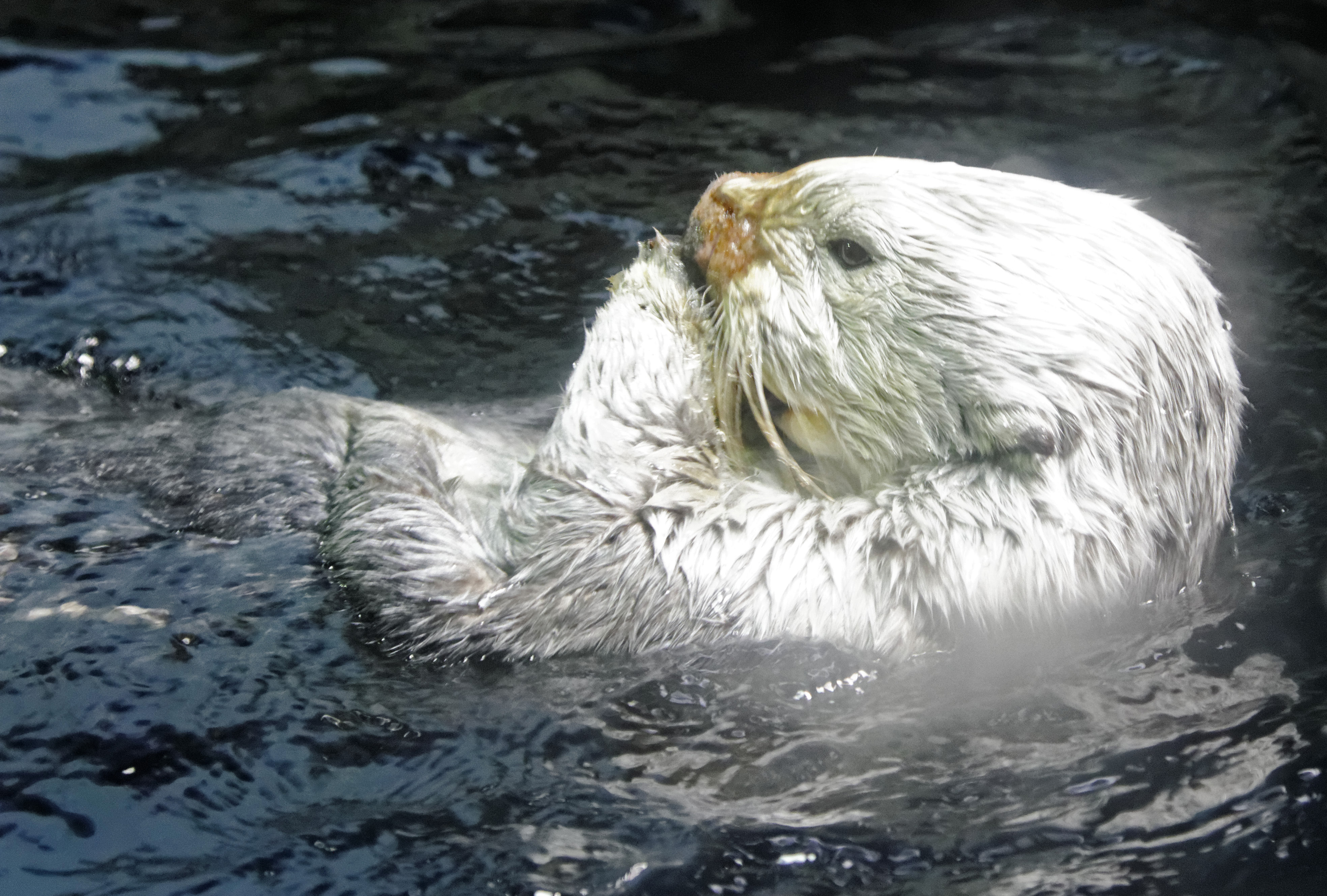
Sea otters that were once bred

In addition, since the opening of the Osaka Aquarium, it has succeeded in breeding spotted seals, pelagic stingrays, California sea lions and sea otters, and received the breeding award from the Japanese Association of Zoos and Aquariums. The aquarium also focuses on breeding and cultivation of species other than aquatic organisms, and in 1993, it received the breeding award from the Association for the first successful breeding of spur-winged lapwings in Japan. In addition, about 200 plant species are exhibited in the Japanese Forest Area inside the building.

=== Research center "OBIC" ===
Osaka Aquarium Kaiyukan has a research center "Osaka Aquarium Biological Research Institute of Iburi Center (OBIC)" in Iburi, Kochi Prefecture, where fish swimming tests and animals to be brought in are carried out in tanks with a water volume of 1,600,000 litres (423,000 US gal) and a water volume of 3,300,000 litres (872,000 US gal).

There are also several offshore fish farms off the coast of OBIC that conduct research on ocean sunfish and other species. Although it was not exhibited at the aquarium, they succeeded in captive breeding Pelagic threshers for 26 days at the offshore fish farms in Iburi, Kochi Prefecture. Other species have been bred in captivity there, such as Chilean devil rays, which have not been recorded since Georgia Aquarium in Taiwan, and was also successful at the tank in OBIC.

It also conducts joint research with Kyoto University and Kochi University and, with the cooperation of local residents, conducts underwater biological surveys of marine life and fish species in the surrounding waters.

In 2001, the aquarium published a research book at the OBIC, publishing the knowledge accumulated by the Osaka aquarium over 10 years on 567 species of fish in 136 families. The research book later received the Kochi Prefecture Academic Publishing Award. The OBIC is not open to the public, but the interior is sometimes opened to the public for events.

OBIC celebrated its 20th anniversary in 2017, and held a 20th anniversary event on July 29.

Research and conservation is reported in the bulletin "kaiyu(かいゆう)".

== Architecture and name ==
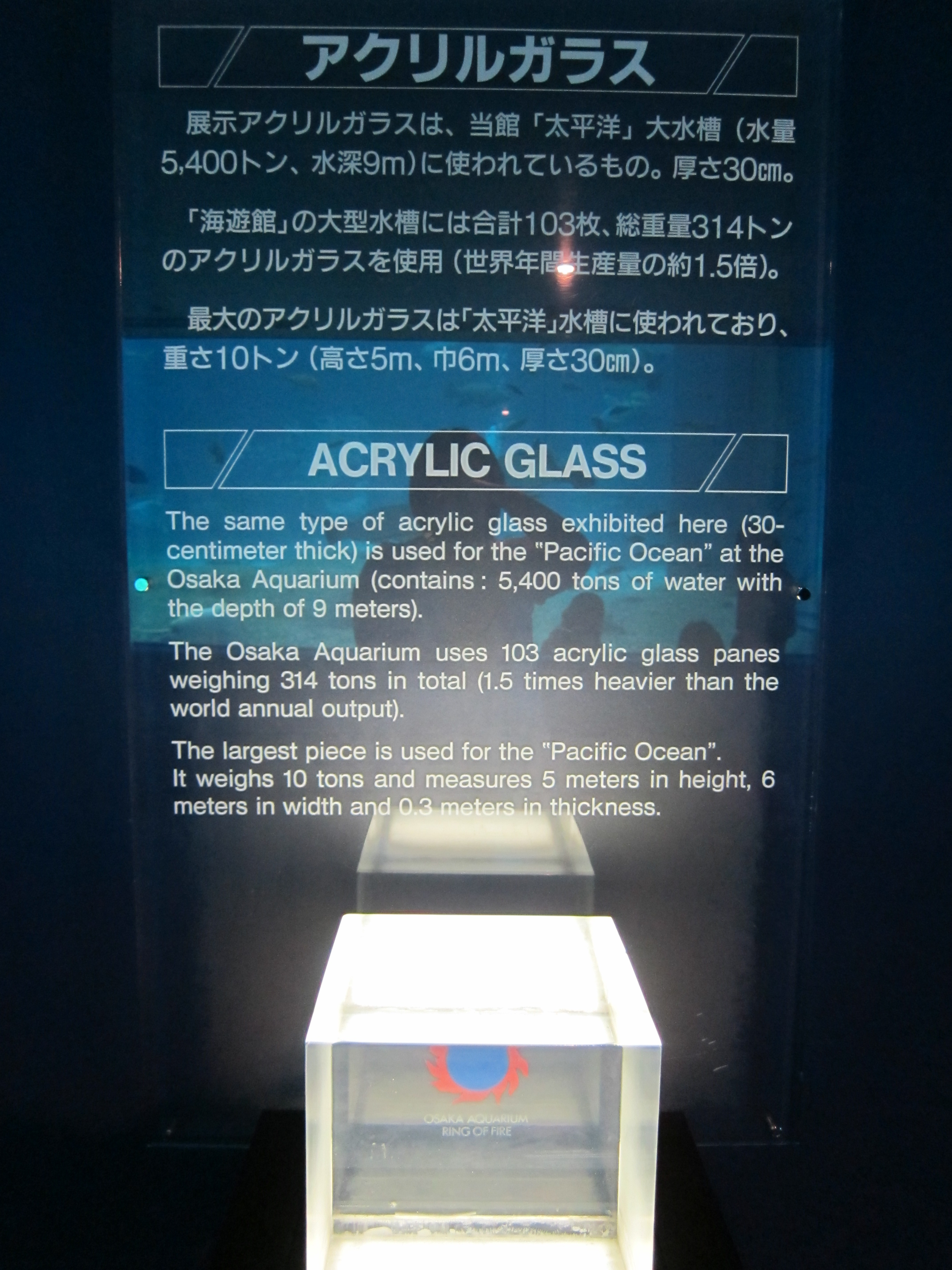
Description of acrylic glass. The amount of acrylic glass used in the Osaka Aquarium was 1.5 times the annual world production at that time.

The Osaka Aquarium Kaiyukan's conceptual design, architecture, and exhibit design was led by Peter Chermayeff of Peter Chermayeff LLC while at Cambridge Seven Associates. Peter Chermayeff also built the Lisbon Oceanarium in Portugal and other buildings.

The three color schemes that characterise the exterior of the building mimic the union of earth, water, and fire. The fish mural on the exterior wall was painted by Serge Chermayeff, an English designer living in the United States, and the entire building was designed by his son, Peter, who headed the Cambridge Seven Associates Environmental Development Institute.

Visitors first take an escalator up to the 8th floor, and then walk down a corridor to the 4th floor. The first three floors are machine rooms containing filtration equipment and are not open to the public.

Unlike the usual method of filling and unloading the tank (filling from the water surface and unloading from the bottom), the water is filled from the bottom of the tank and unloaded from the top. This is to make it easier to collect leftover food and bodily waste floating in the tank by creating a water flow from the bottom to the top, and to increase the clarity of the water. Oxygen is supplied by creating artificial waterfalls. Most of the waterfalls are located behind the tanks, but some are visible to visitors for production.

The tanks used in the aquarium are made of 314 tonnes (346 tons) of acrylic glass. The largest single pane measures six meters by five meters by thirty centimeters and weighs roughly 10 tons. At the thicknesses used, regular glass would be unwieldy and would not have the desired transparency. About 100 acrylic panels were used to build the tank, which was produced by four companies: Mitsubishi Rayon, Nippura, Sumitomo Chemical, and Reynolds Group Holdings of the United States.

TV personality Emiko Kaminuma stated that it was her role to decide the name "海遊館 Kaiyukan" in Japanese. Kaminuma, who was a member of the name selection committee among the common candidates starting from Marine, chose Kaiyukan, which had only one vote, and said, "It is better to make it an impactful "Kaiyukan'". Emiko Kaminuma further said, "There is no impact with a mundane name that starts with Marine. If it is expressed in three kanji characters, the meaning will be easier to understand, and it will have an easy-to-understand impact like Dream Factory (夢工場)." As a result, it does not have a name starting with Marine, which had a large number of votes, but was named Kaiyukan.

== Gallery ==
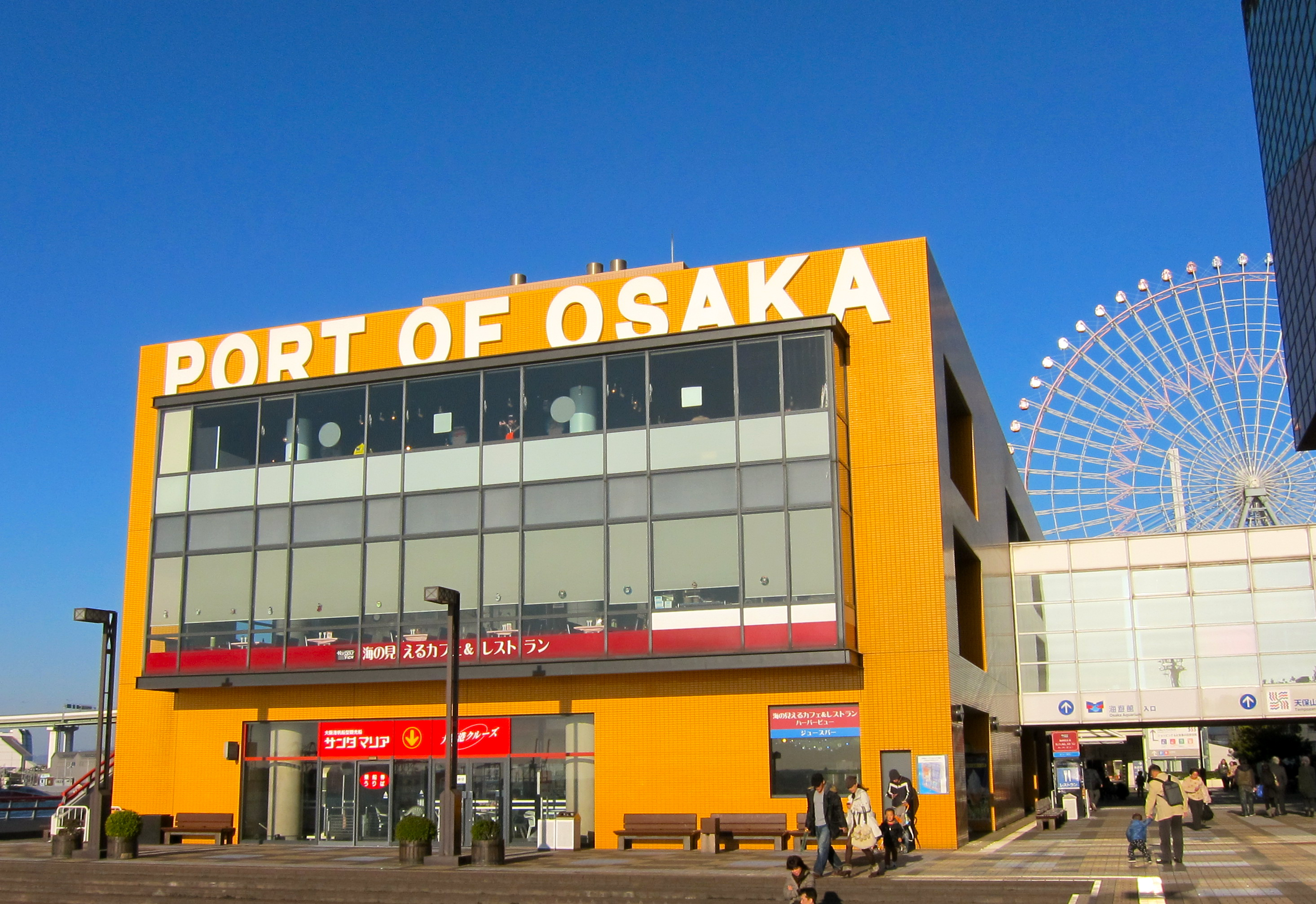

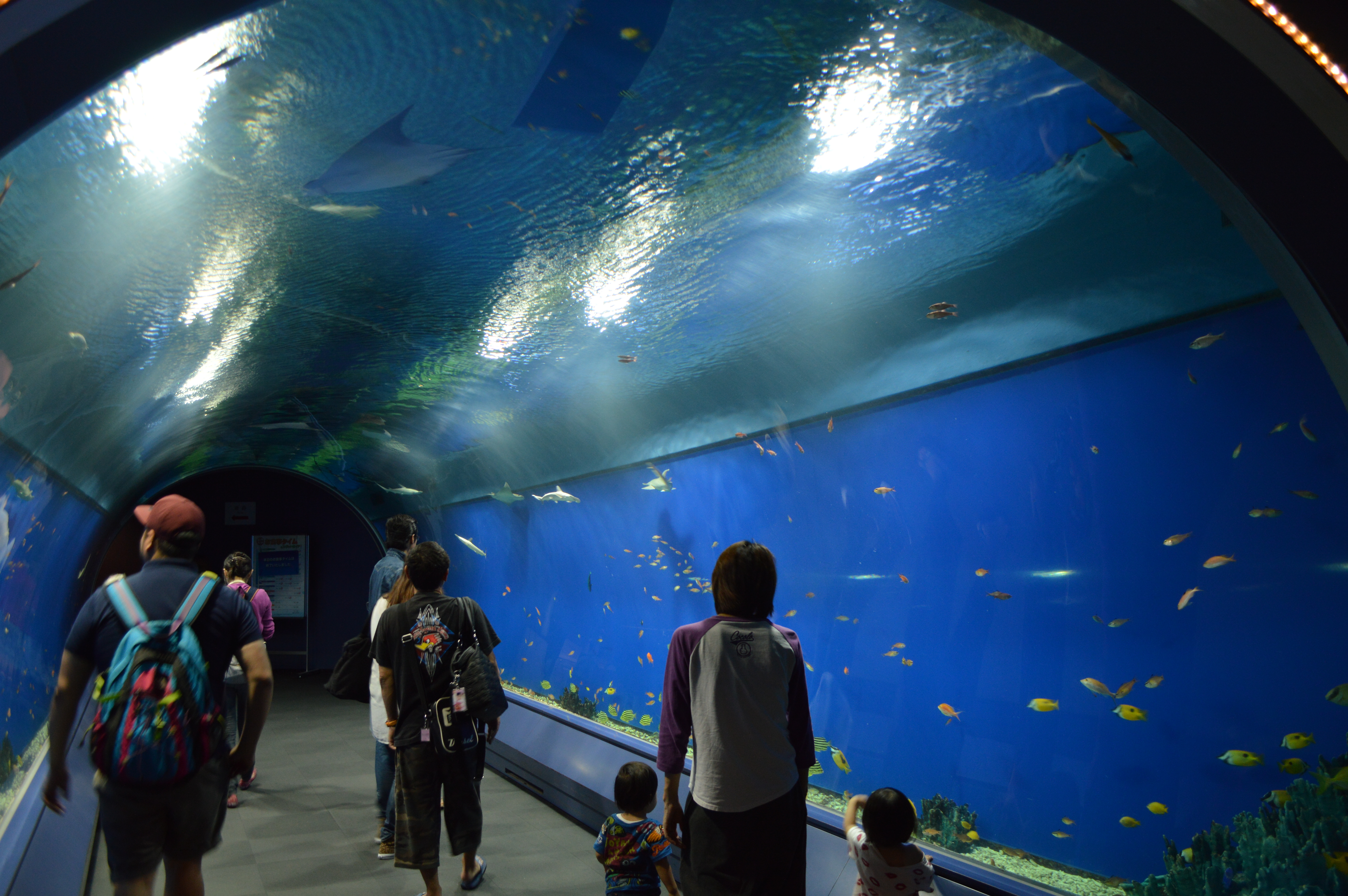

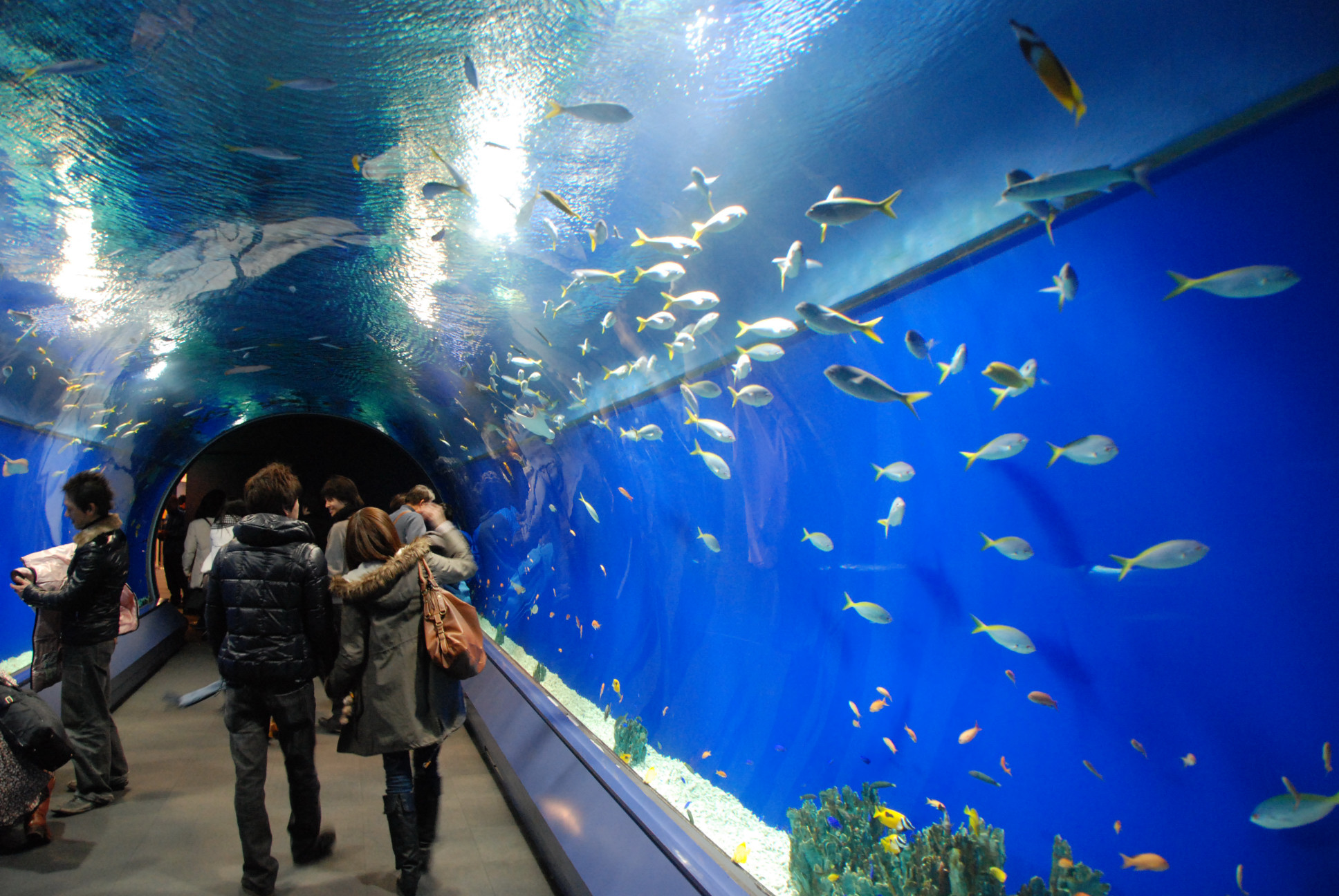

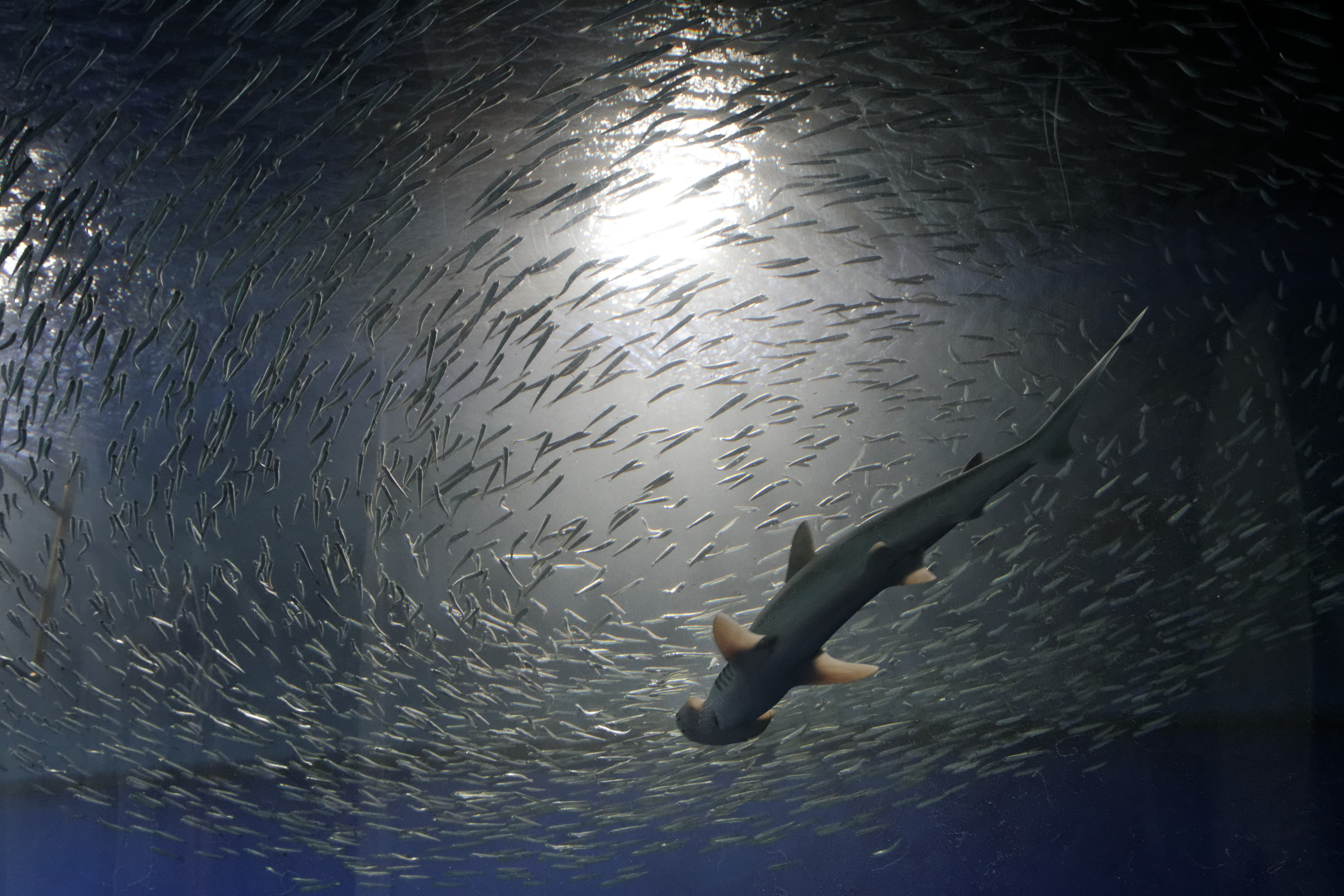

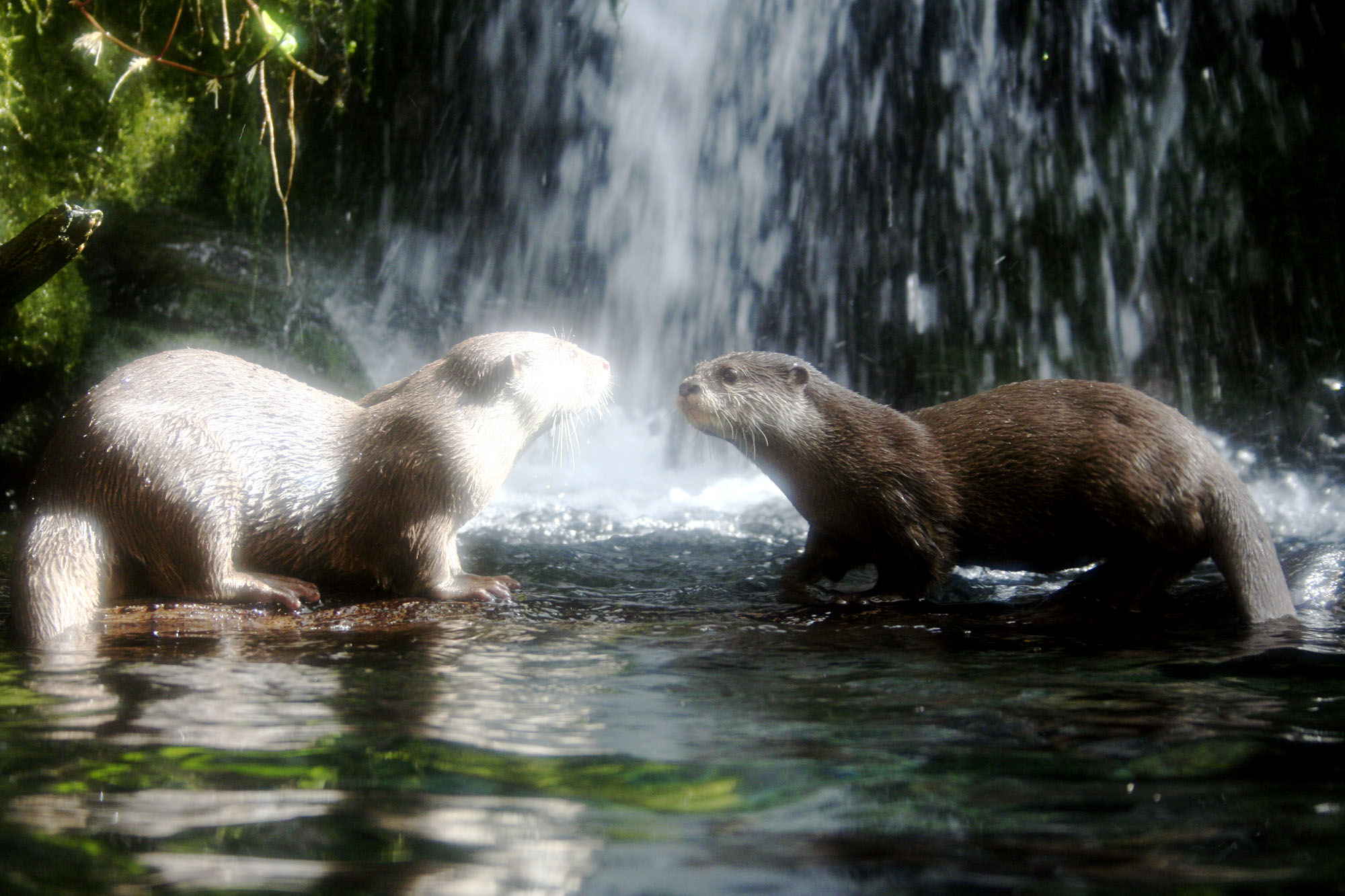

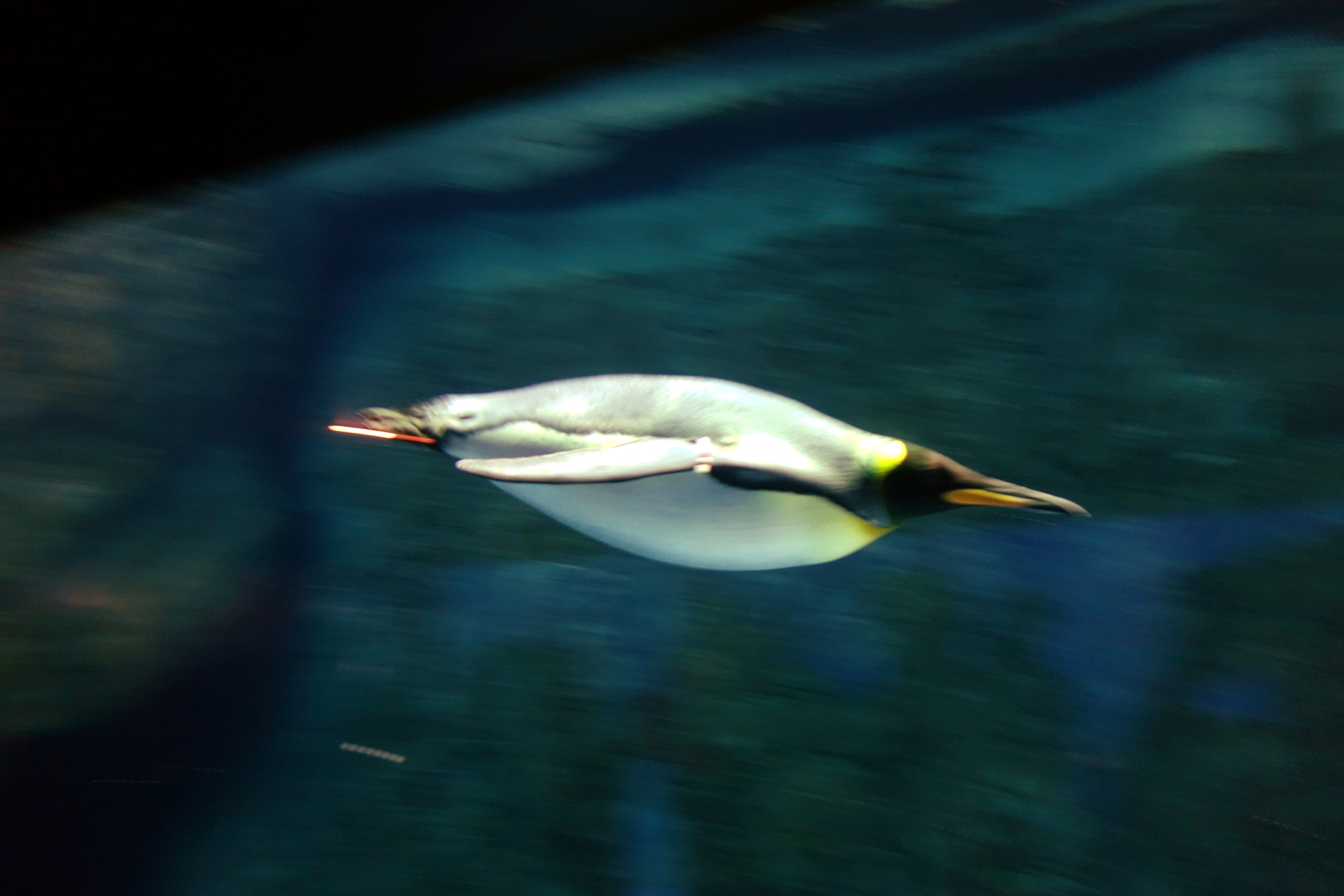

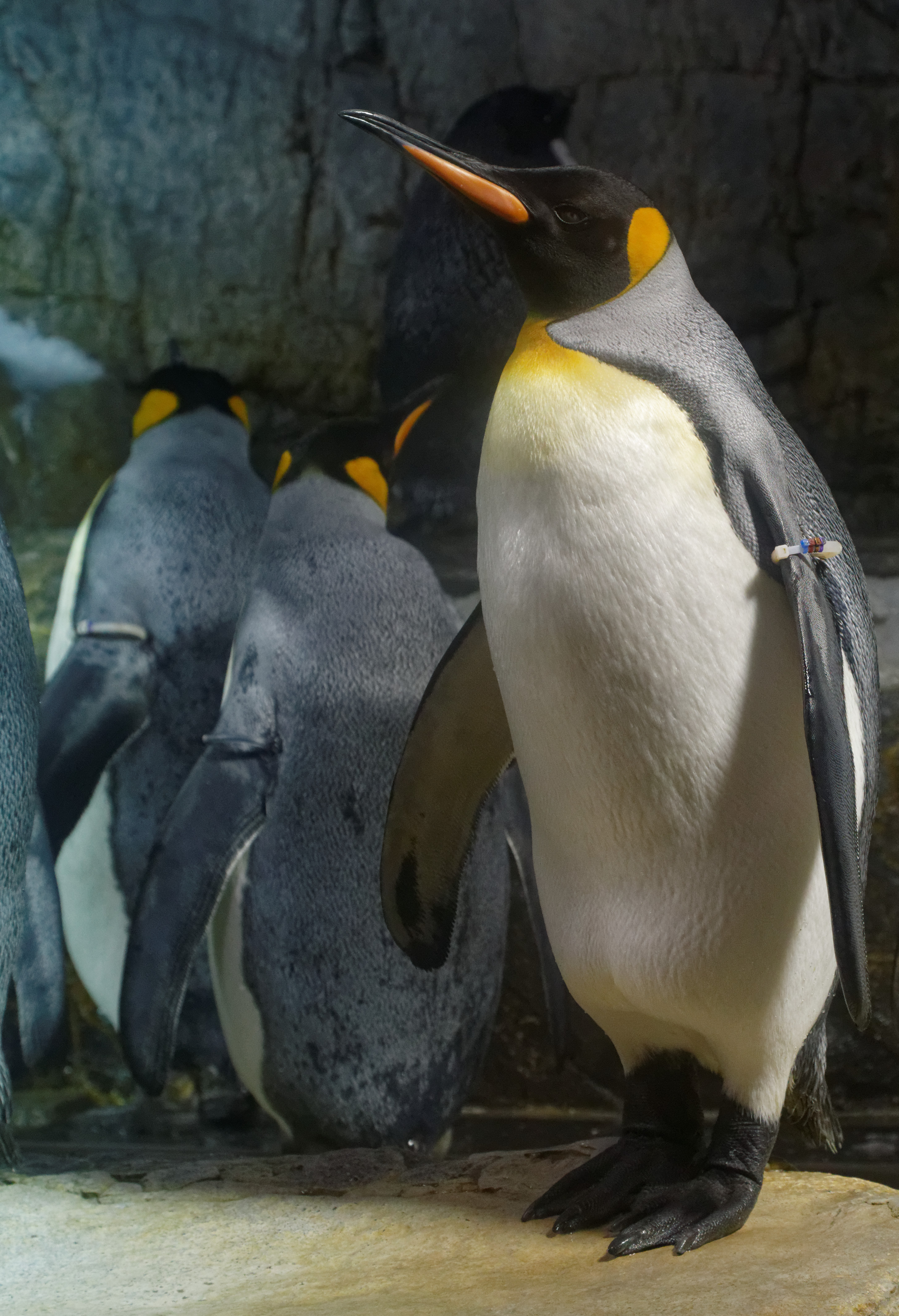

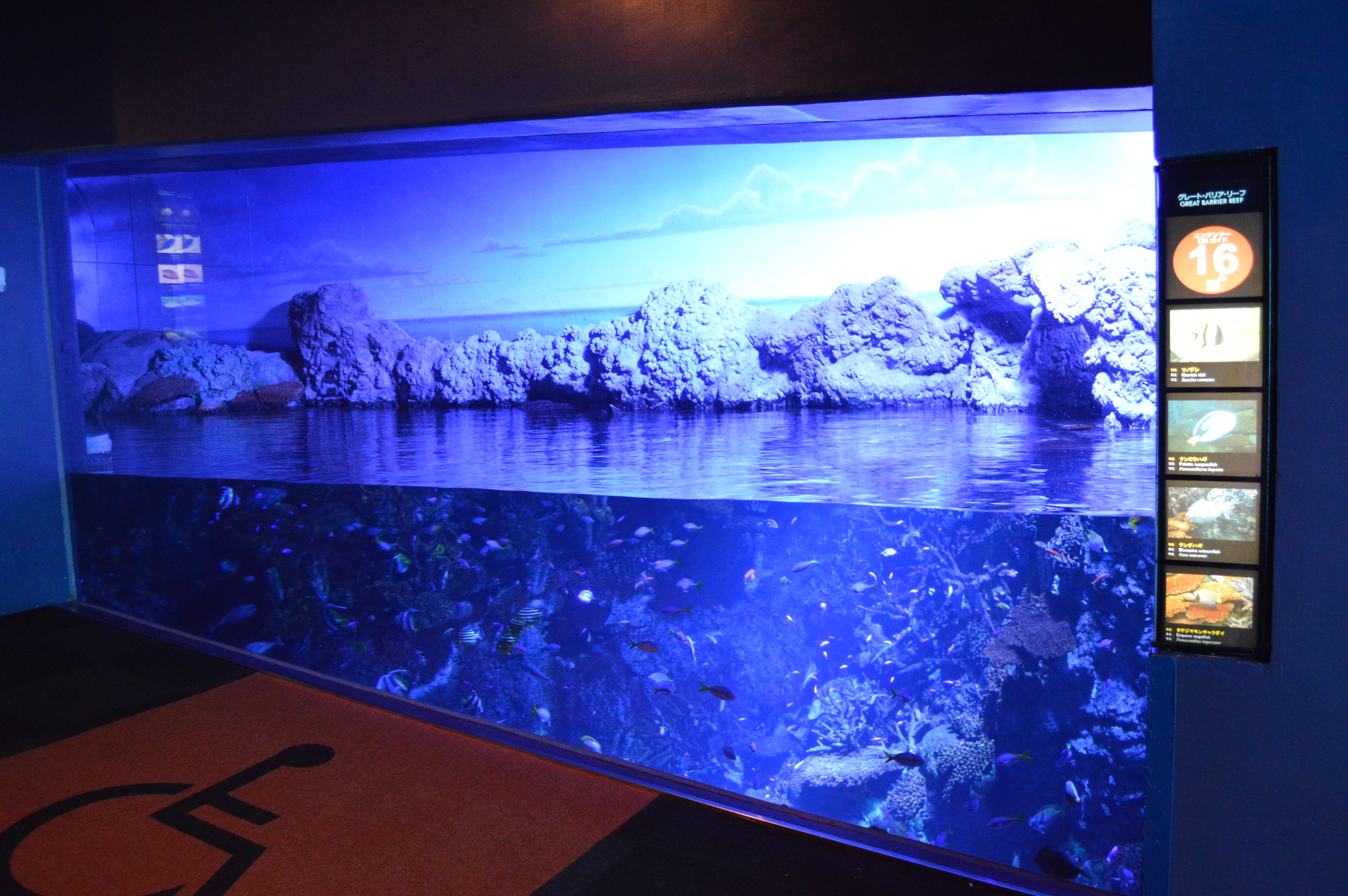

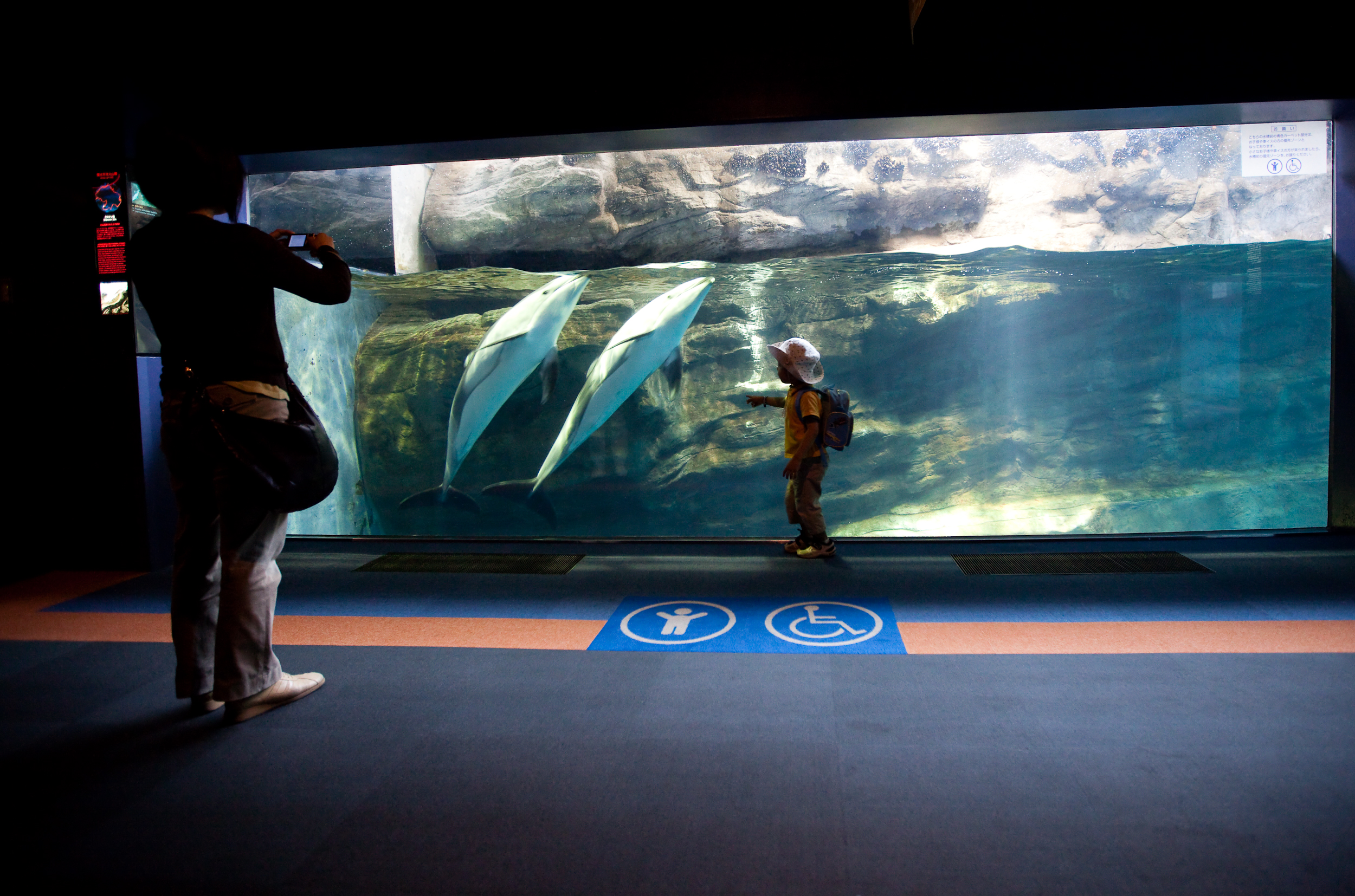

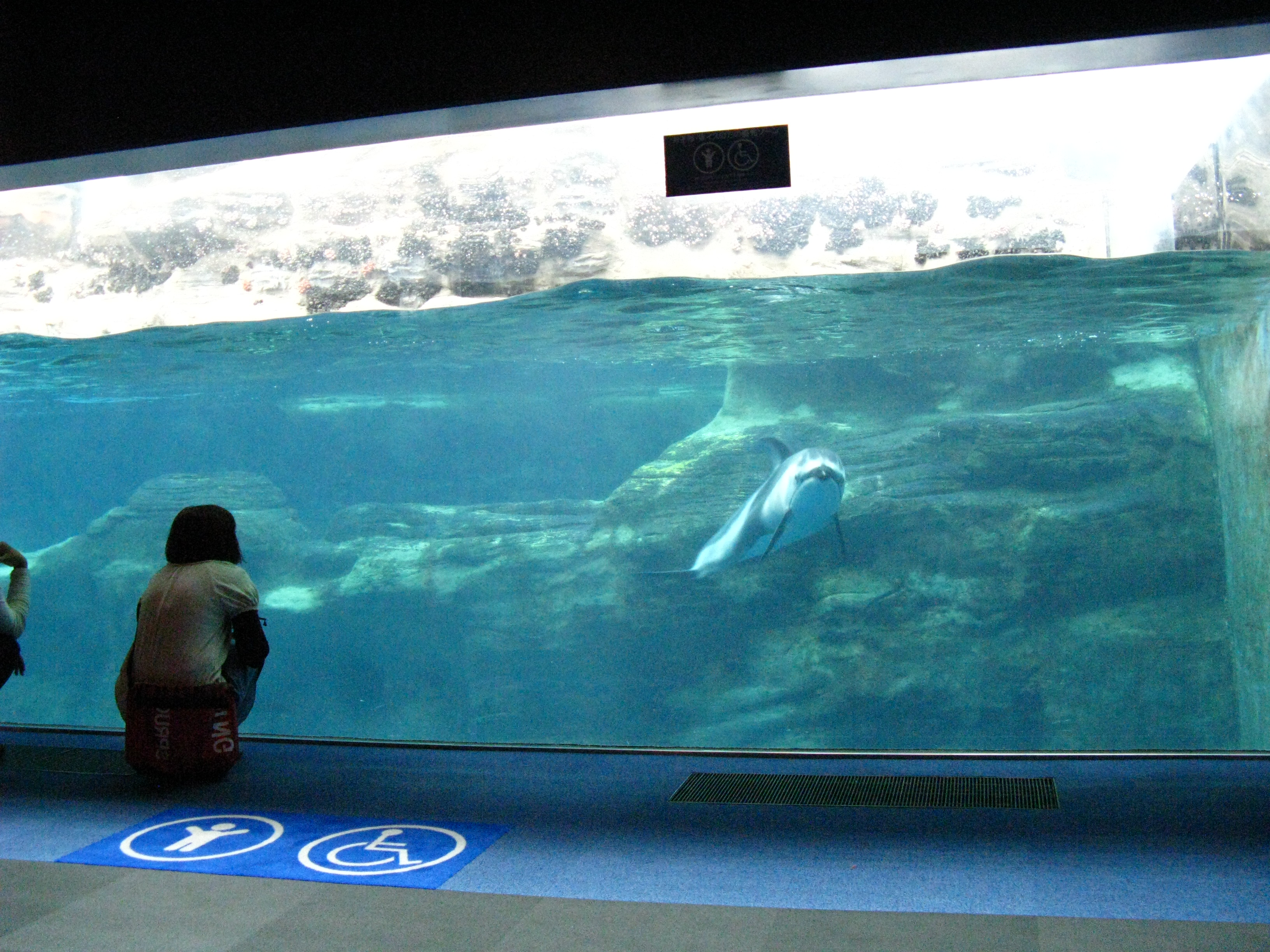

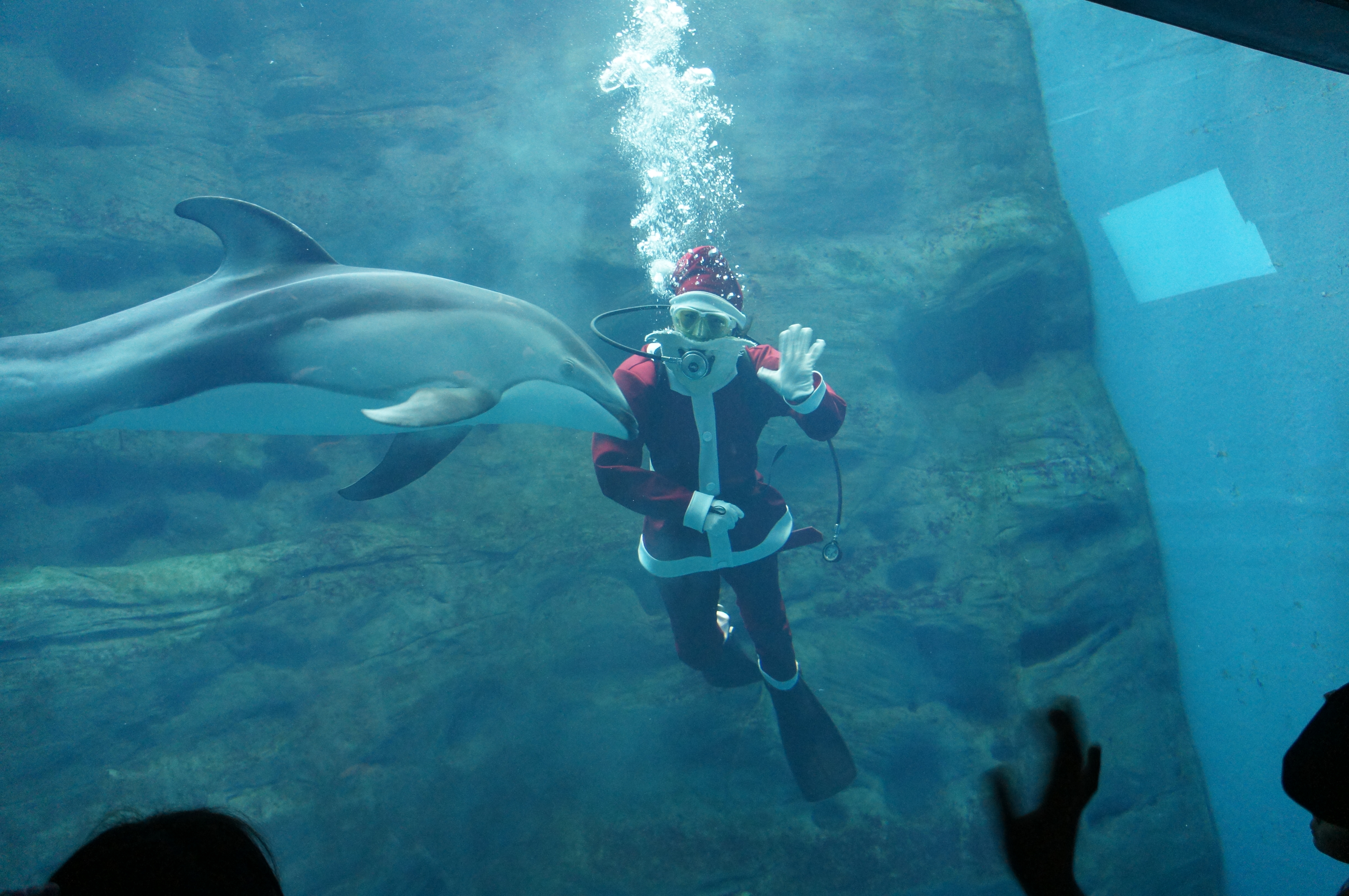

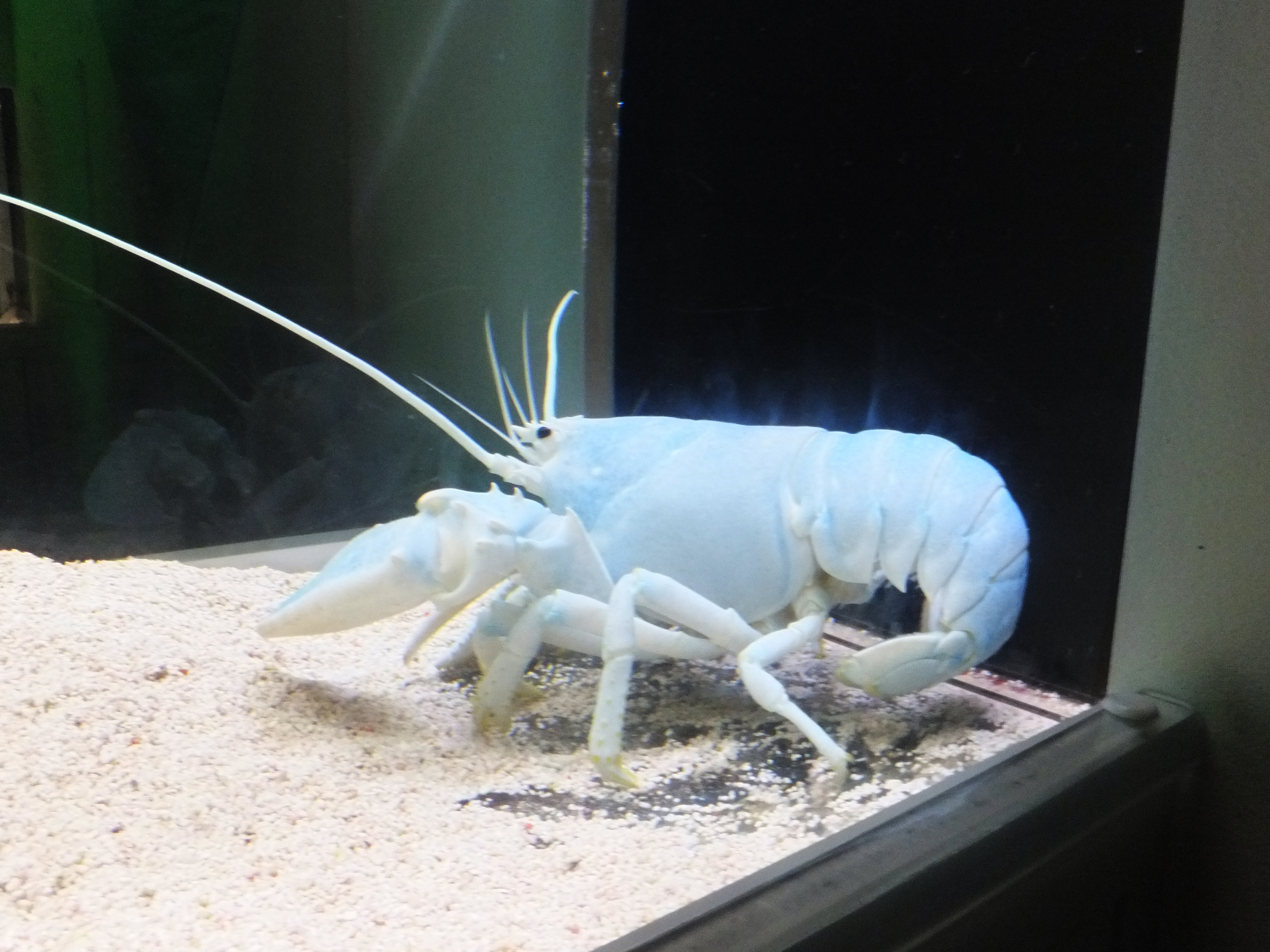

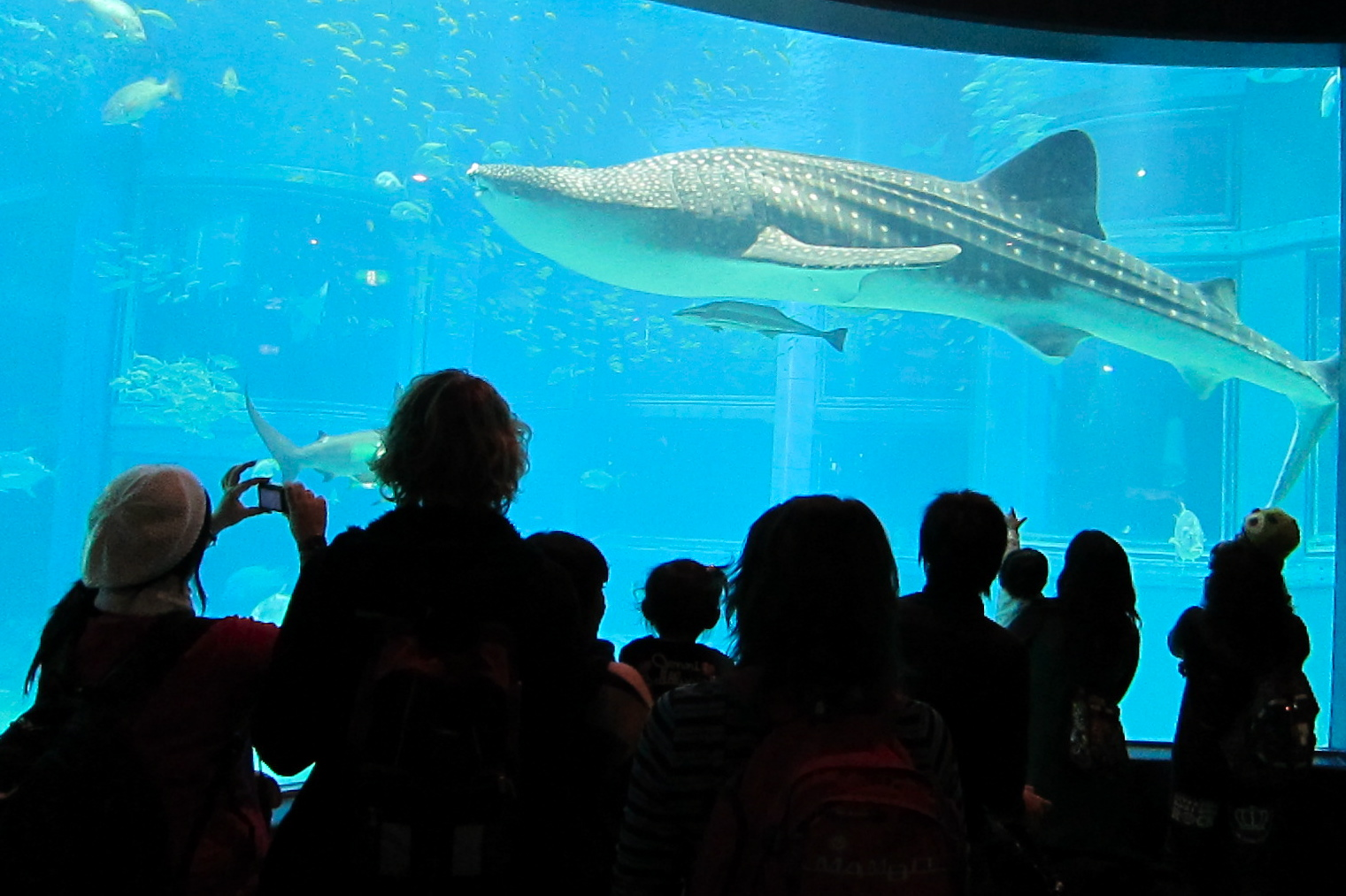

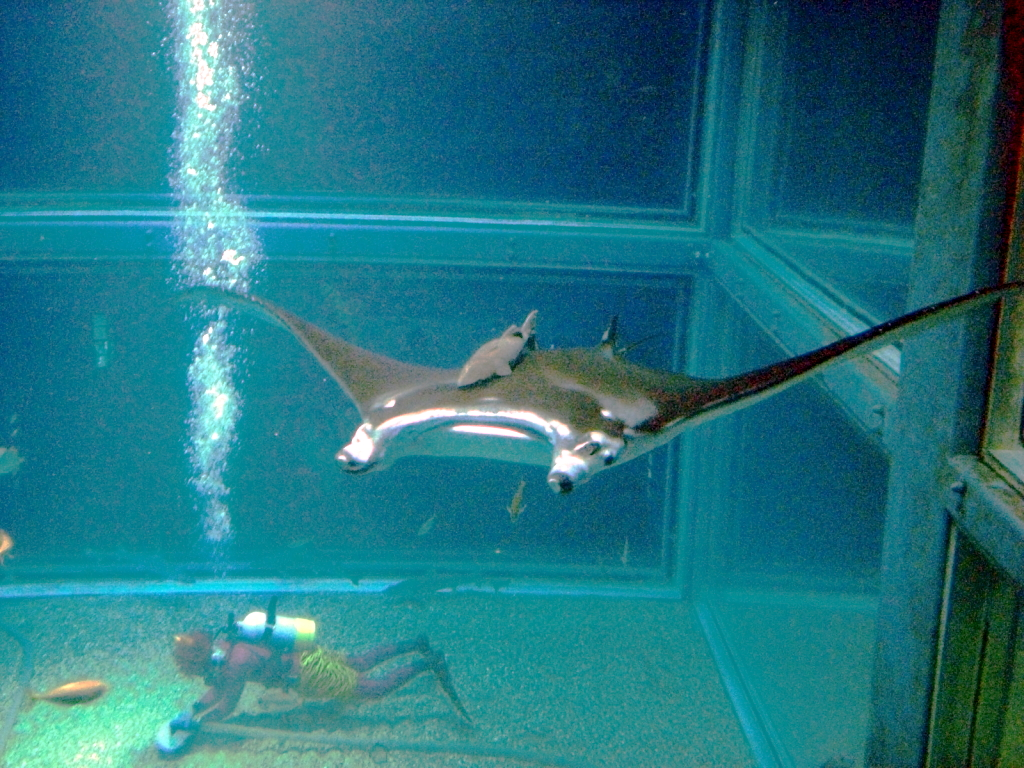

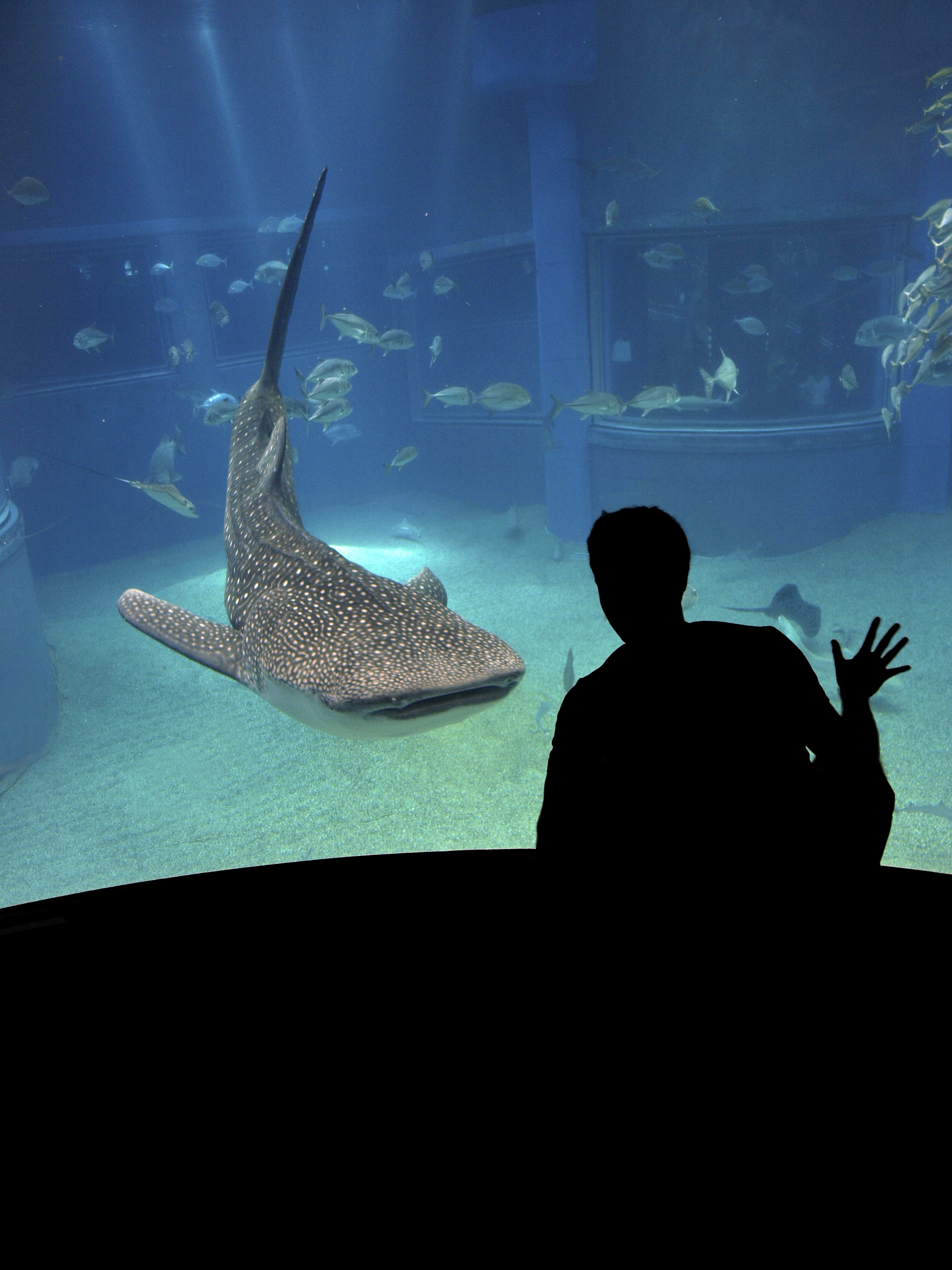

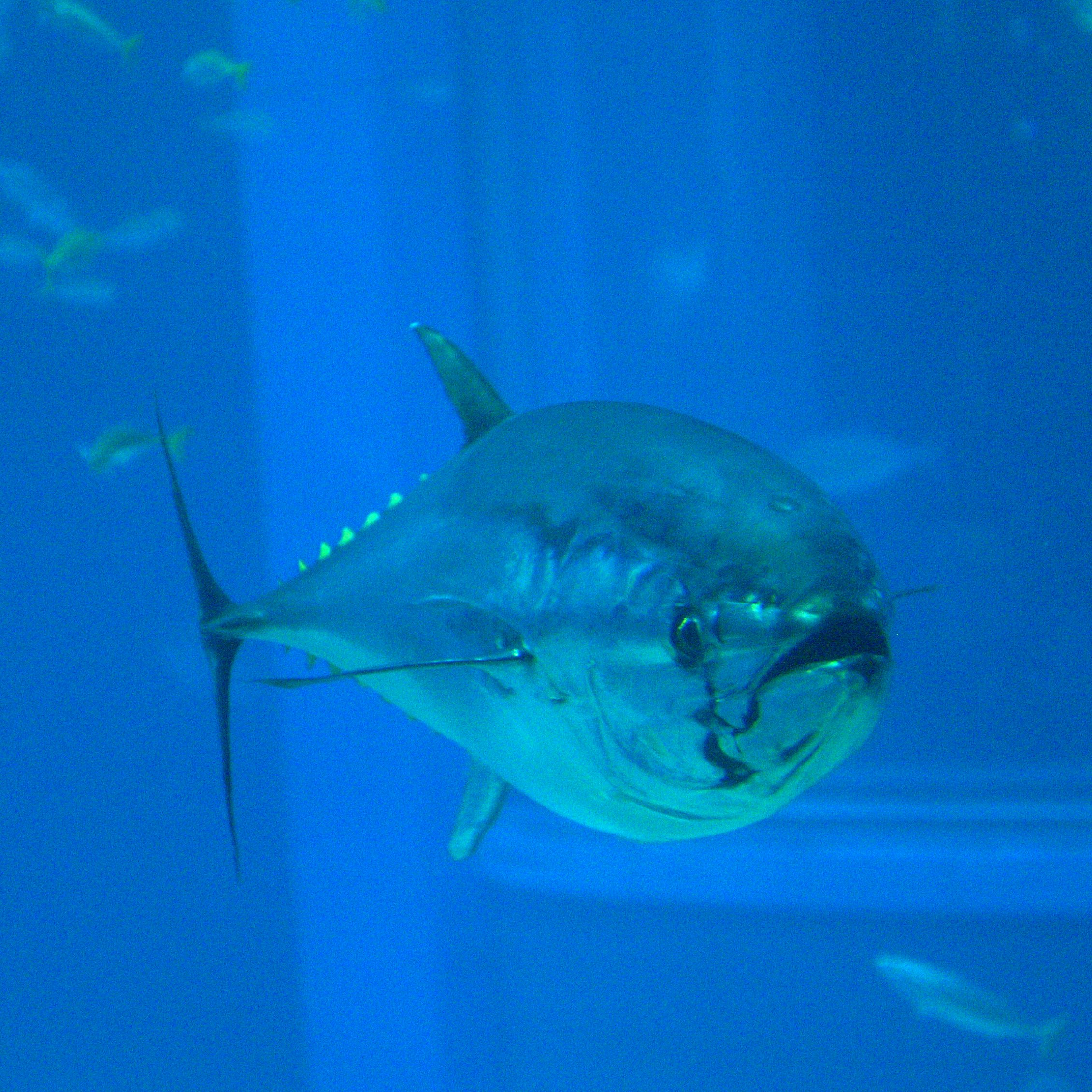

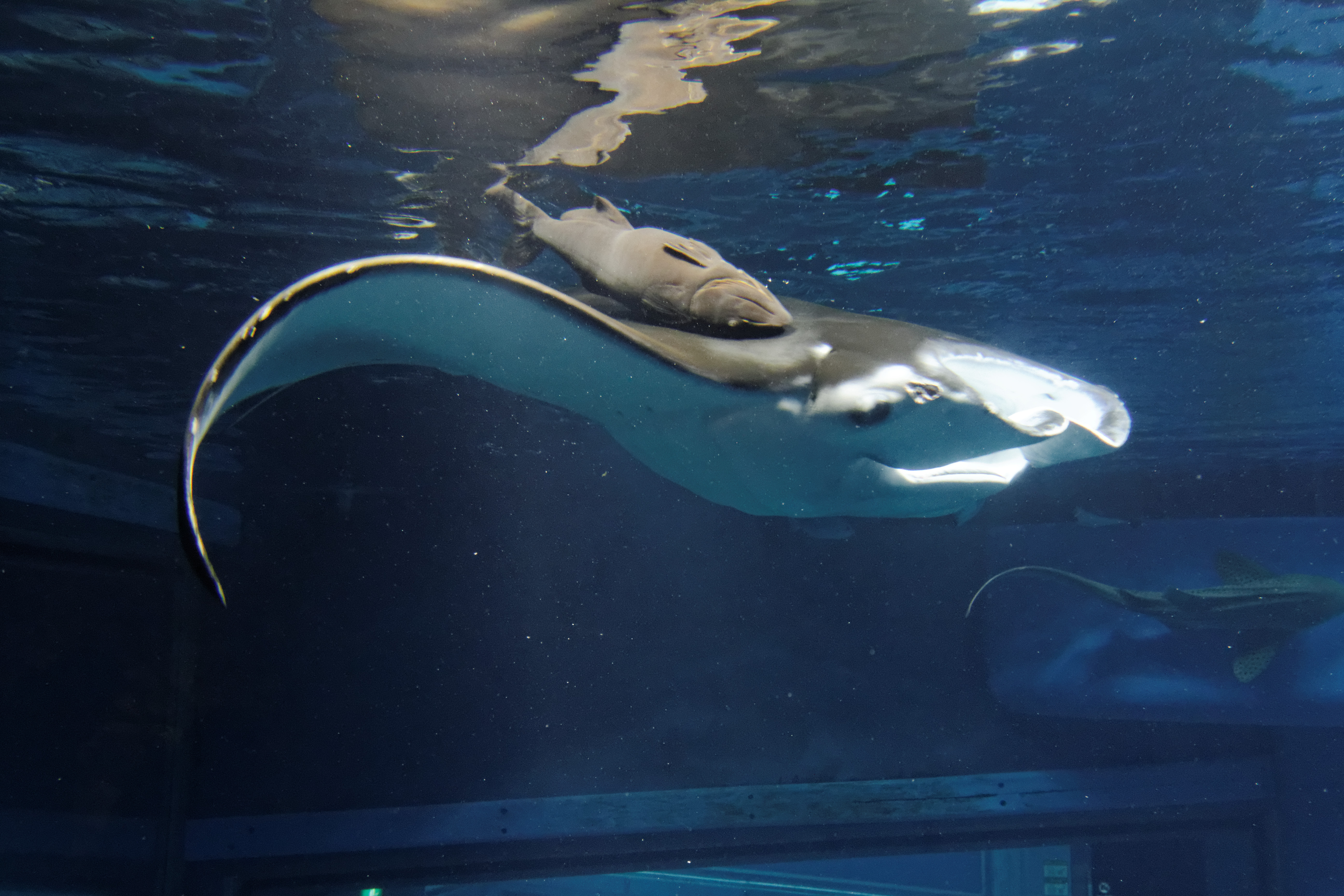

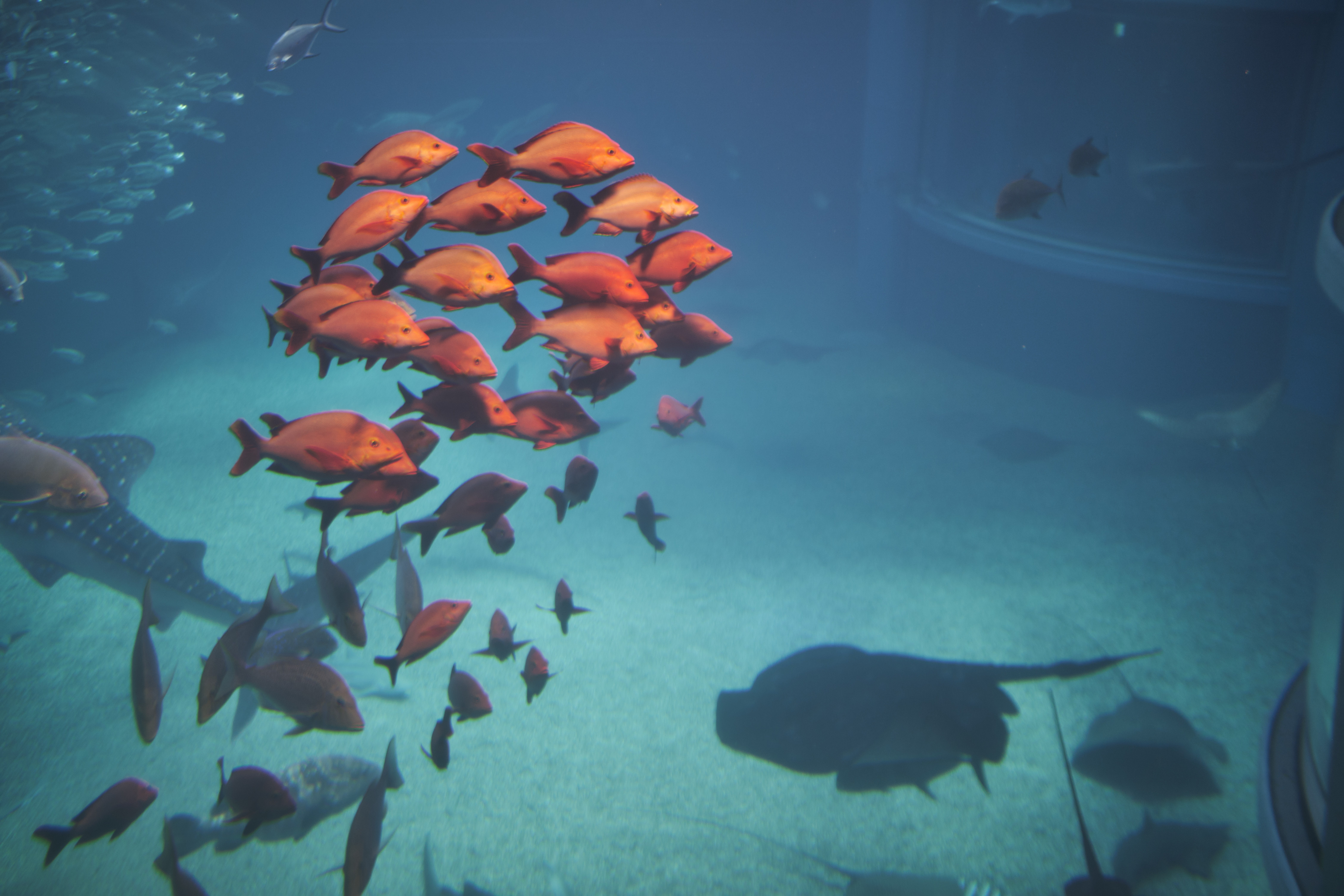

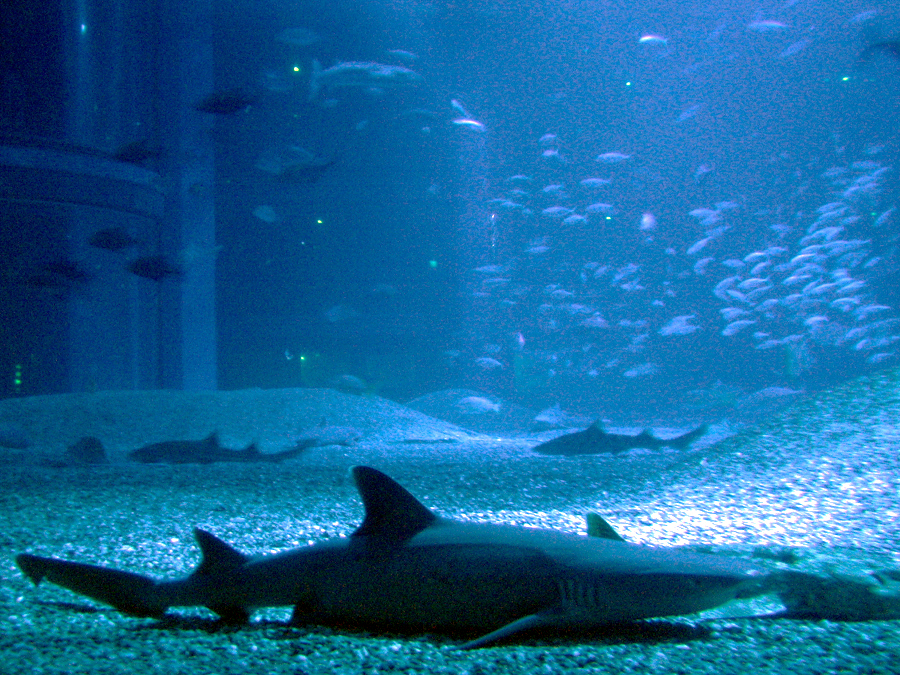

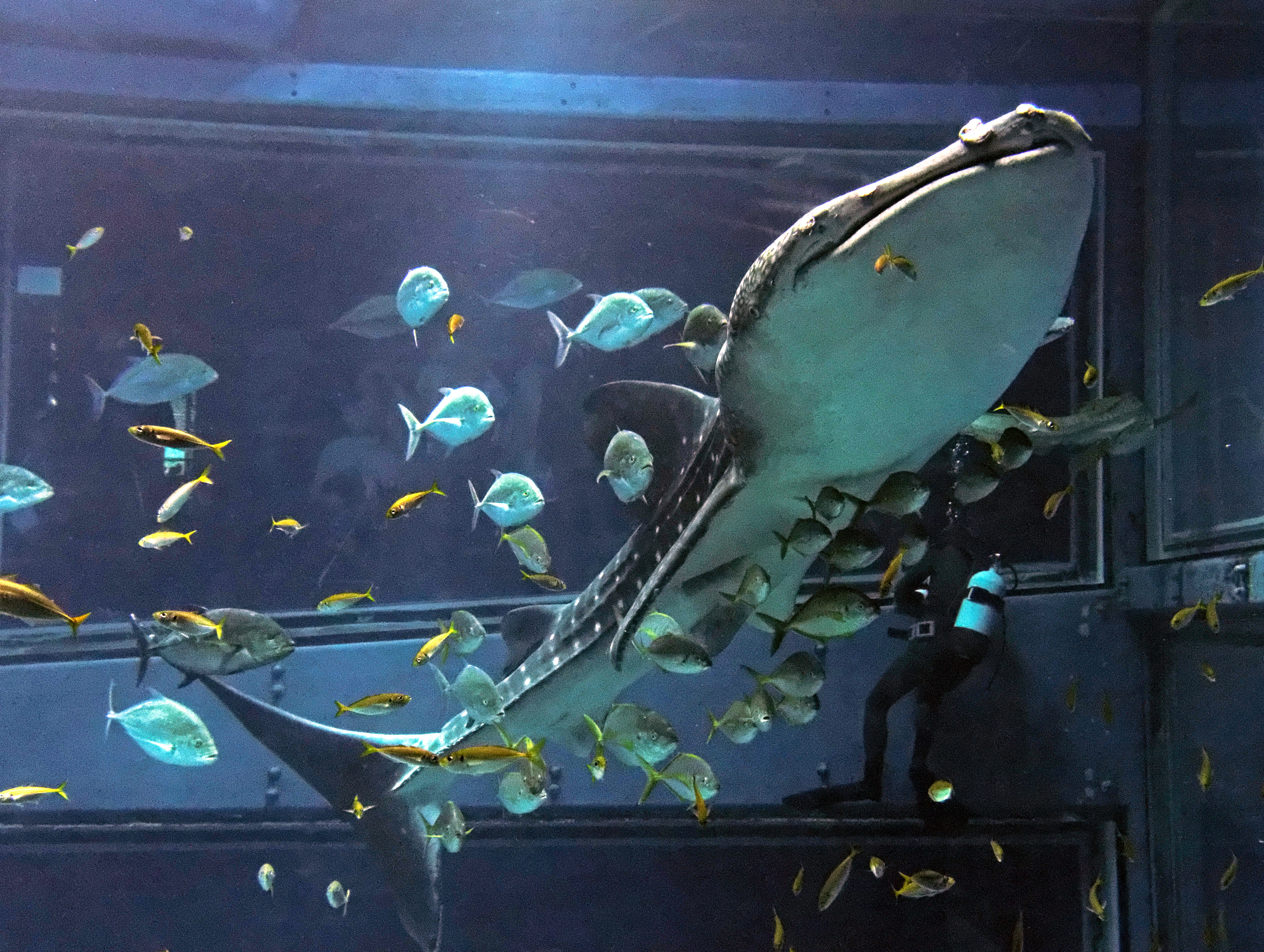

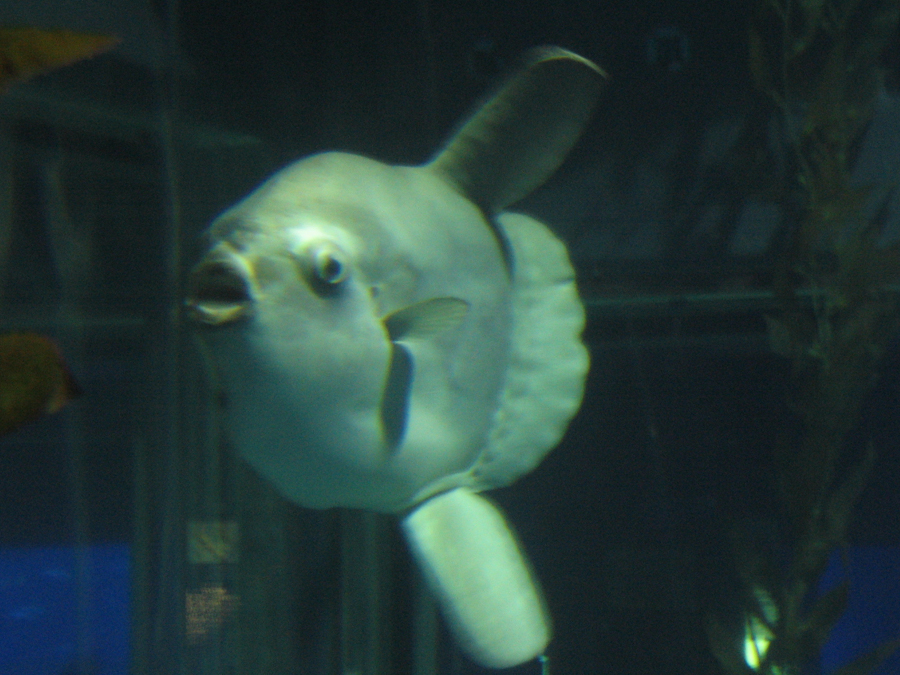

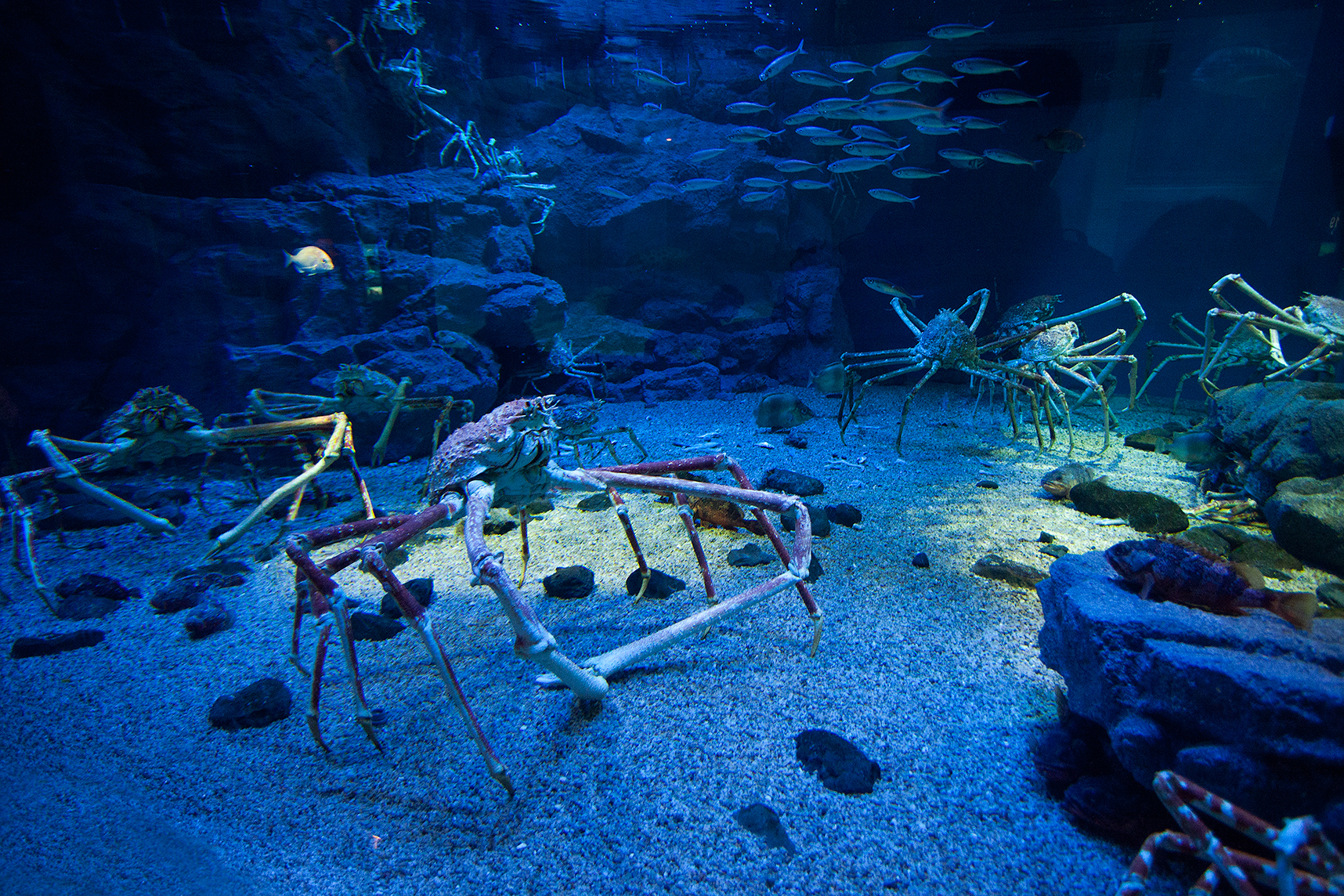

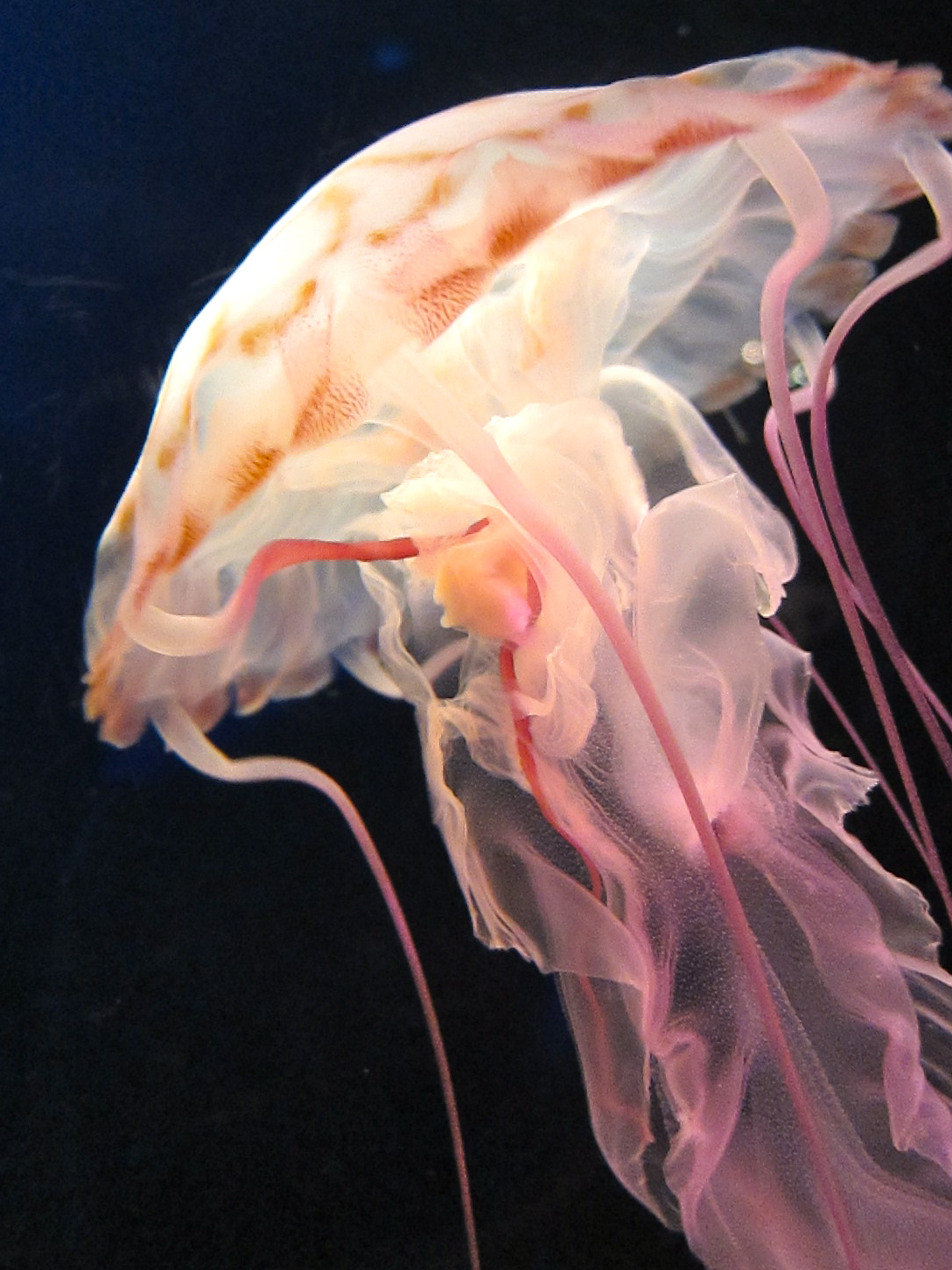

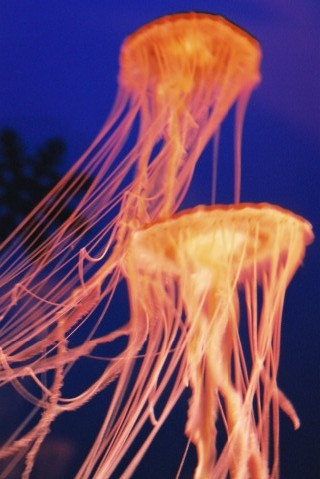

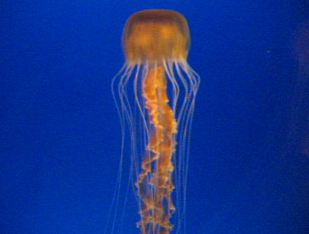

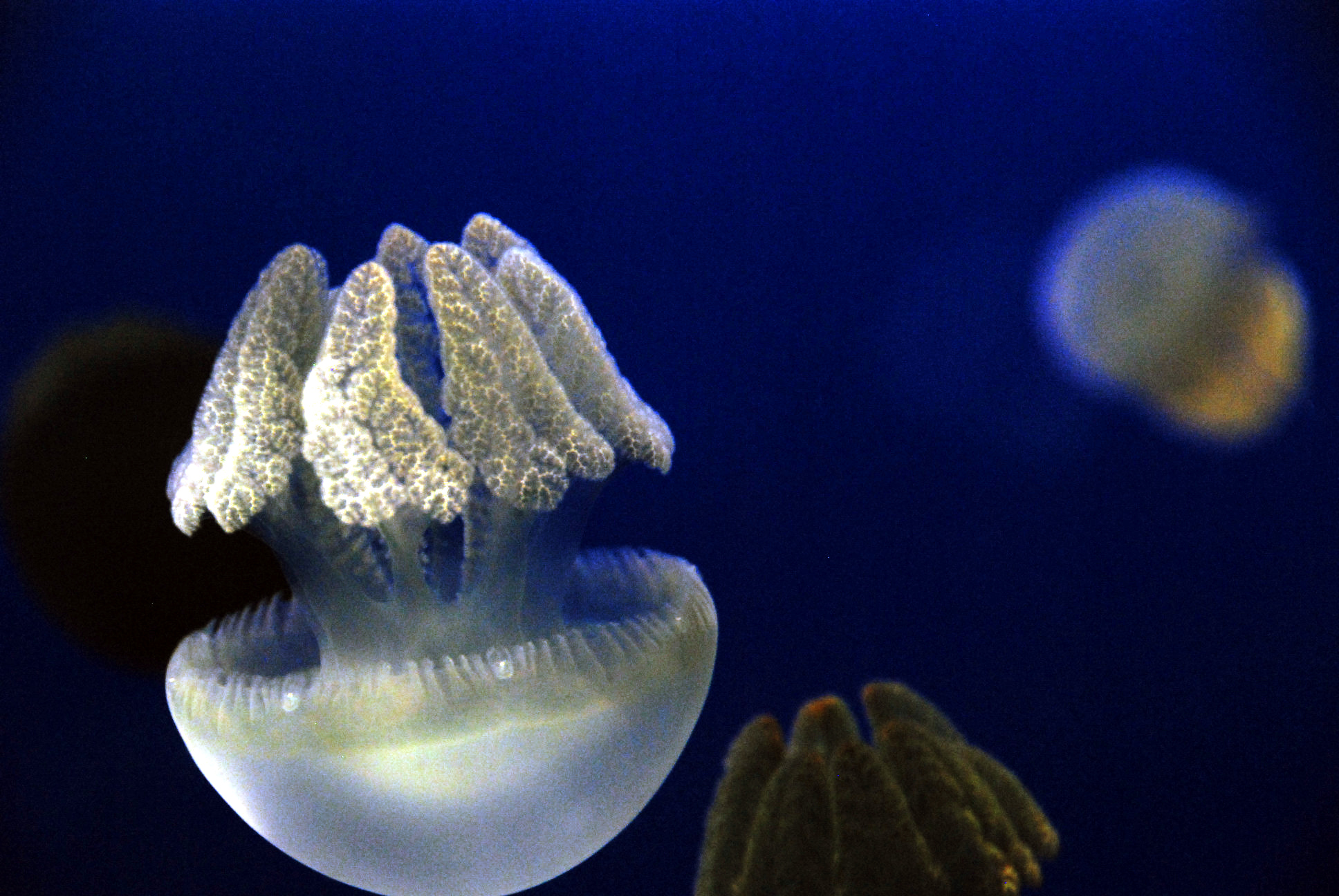

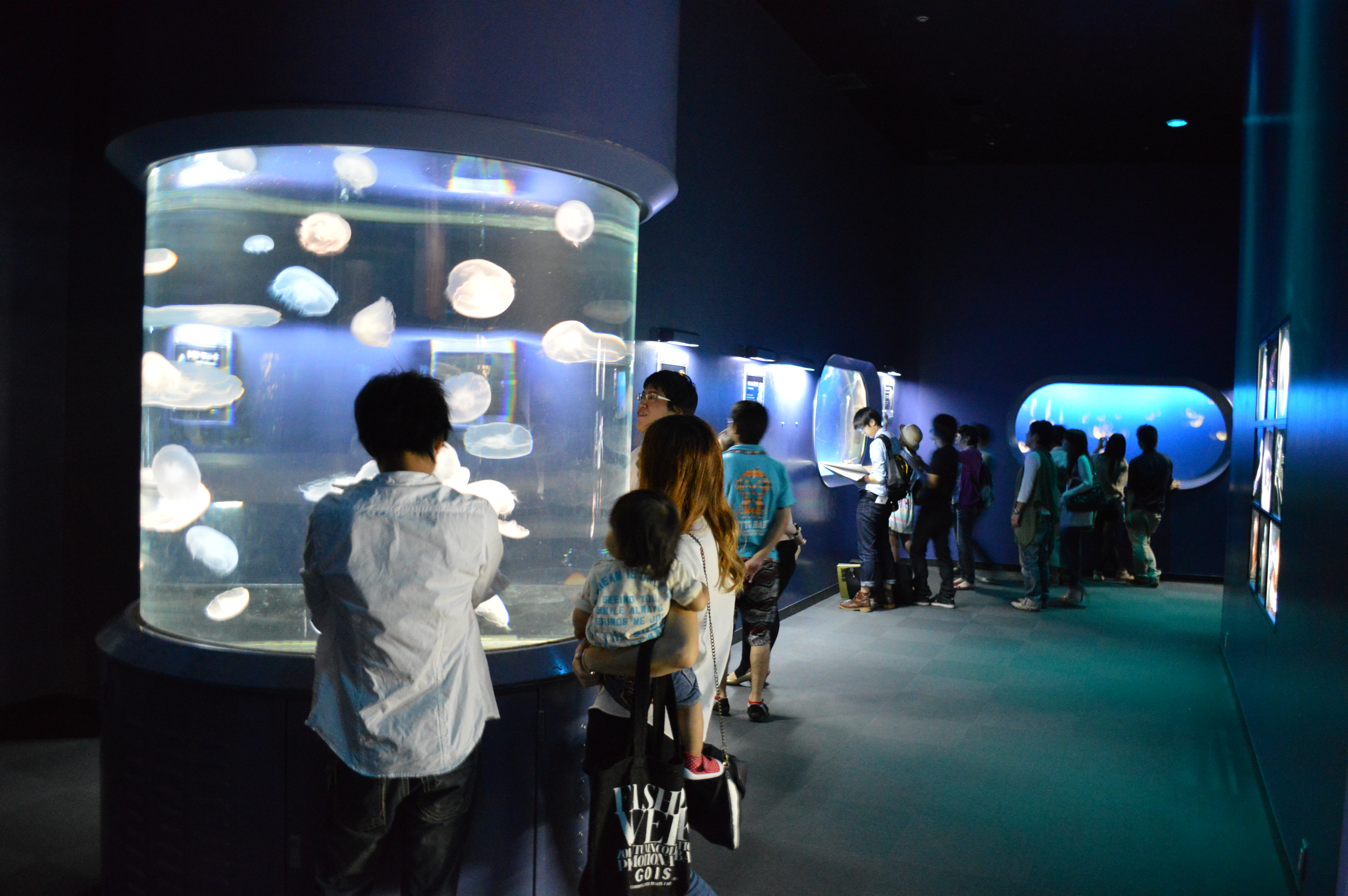

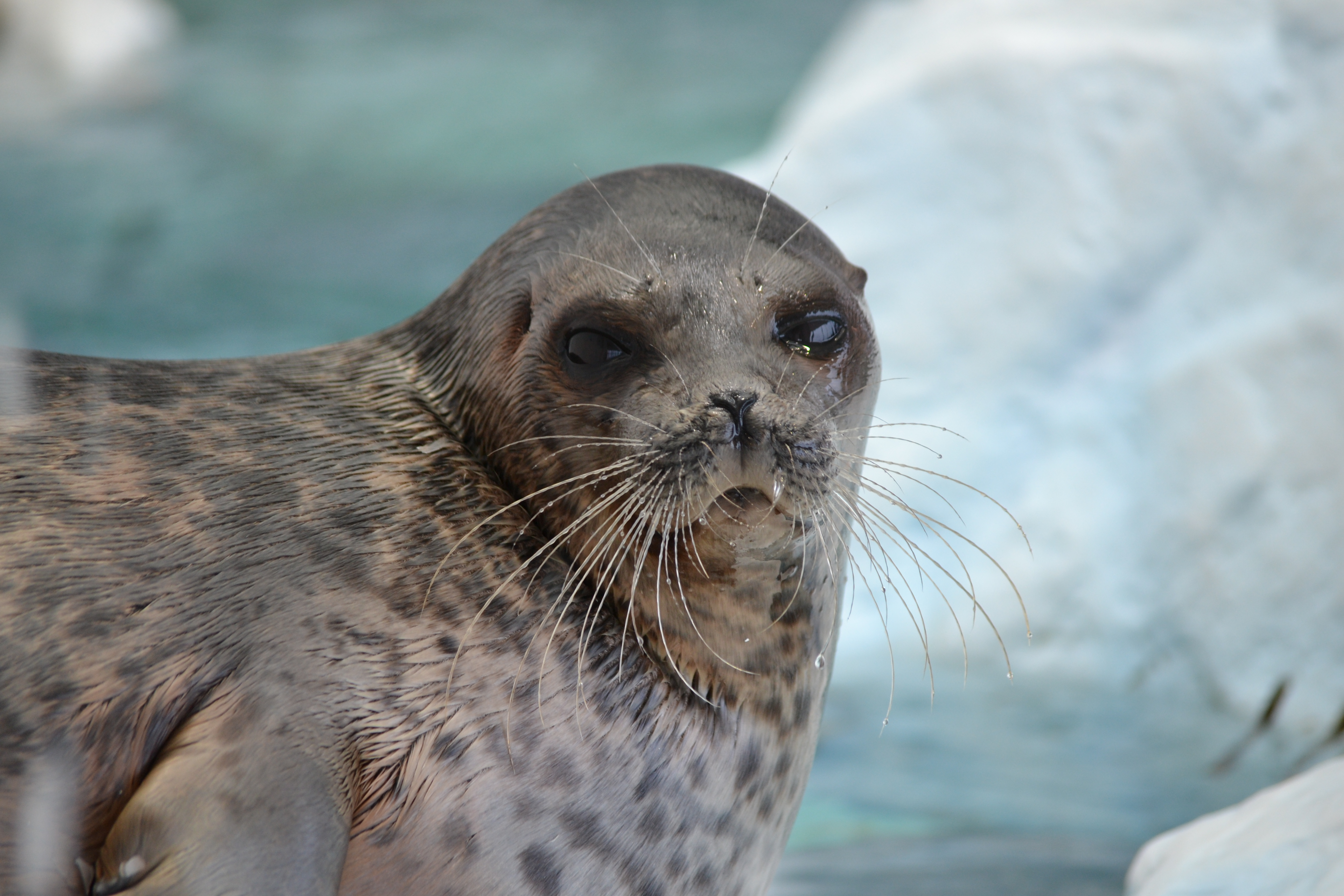

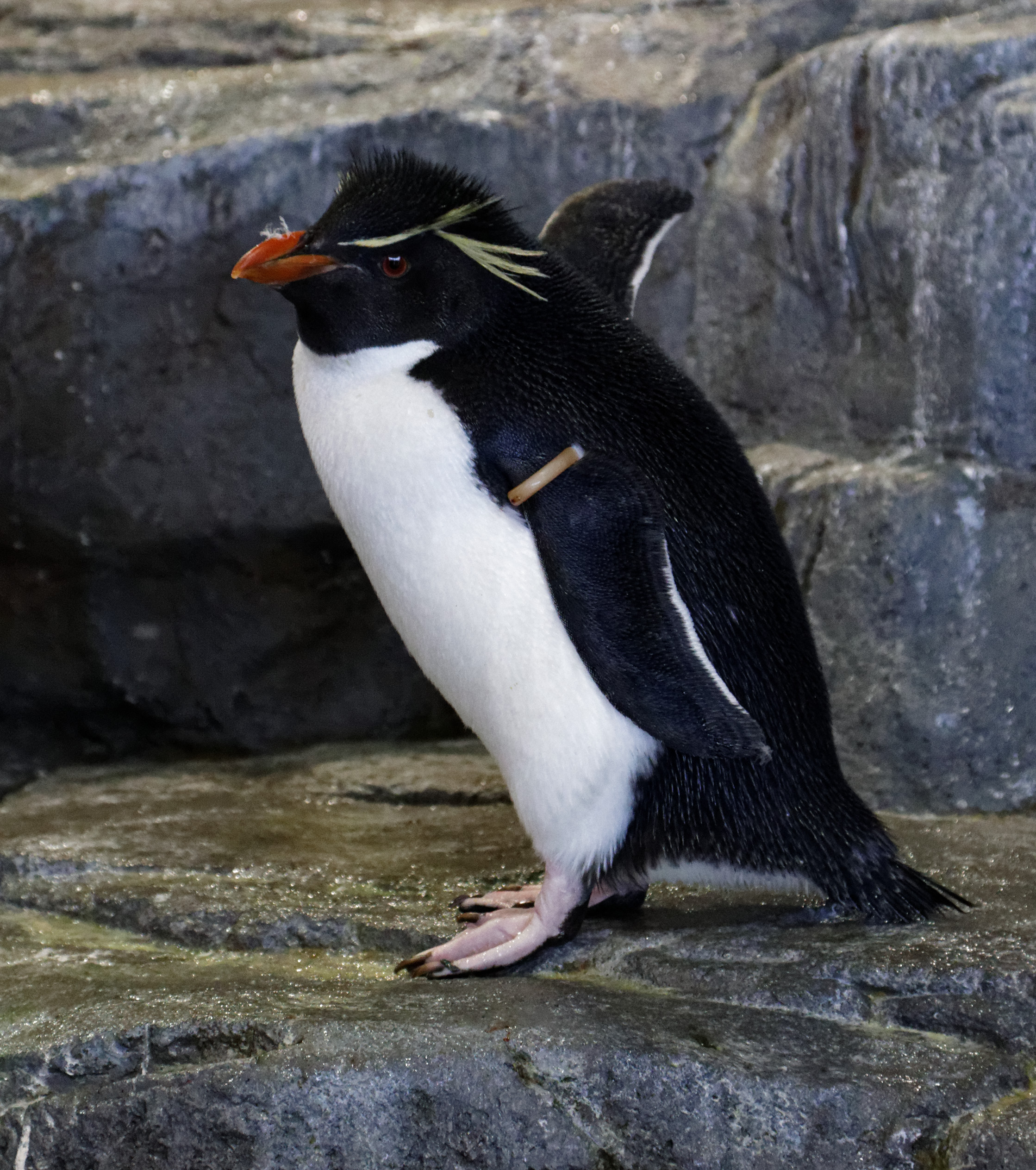

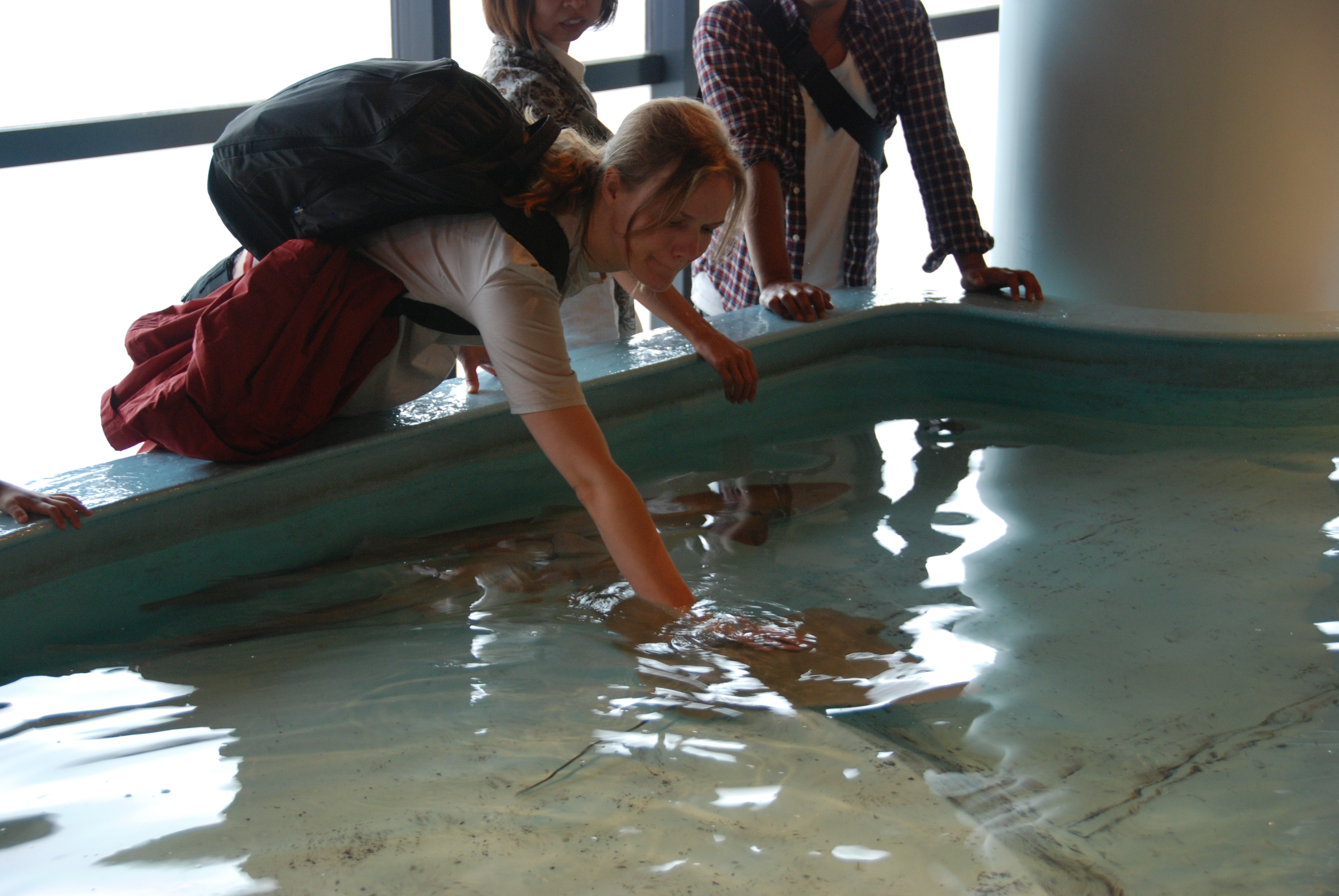

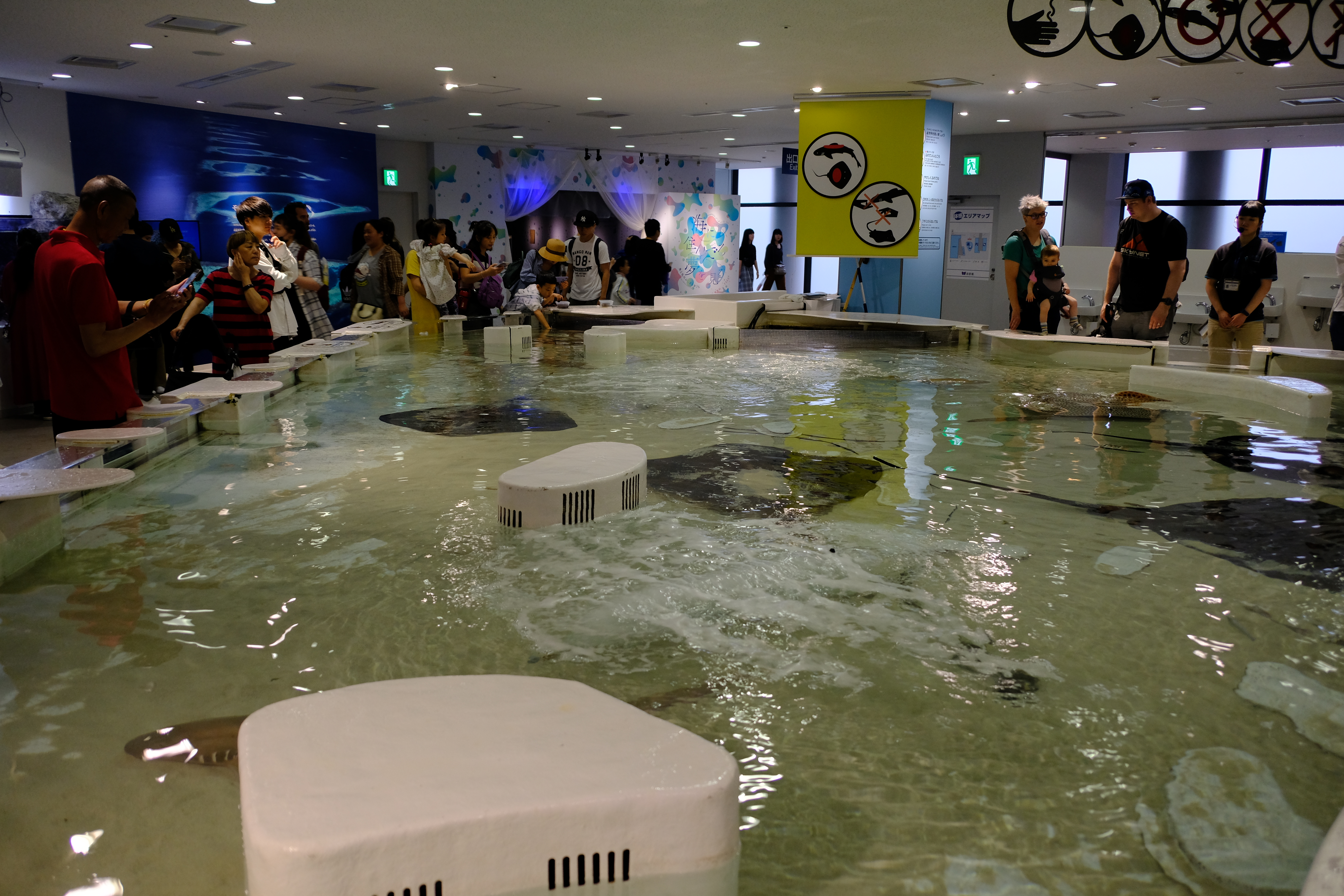

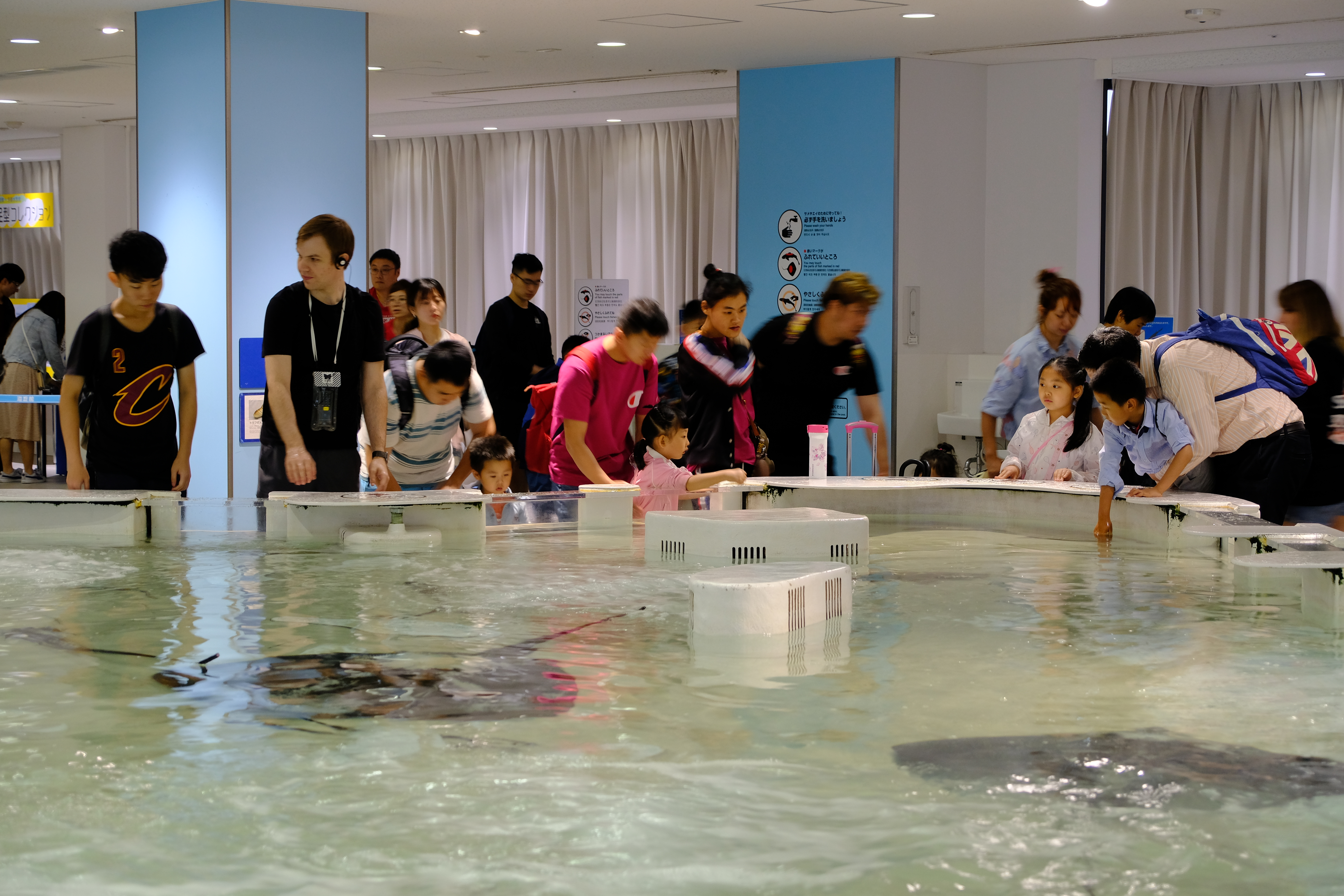

== See also ==
- Mount Tenpō
- Tempozan Ferris Wheel
