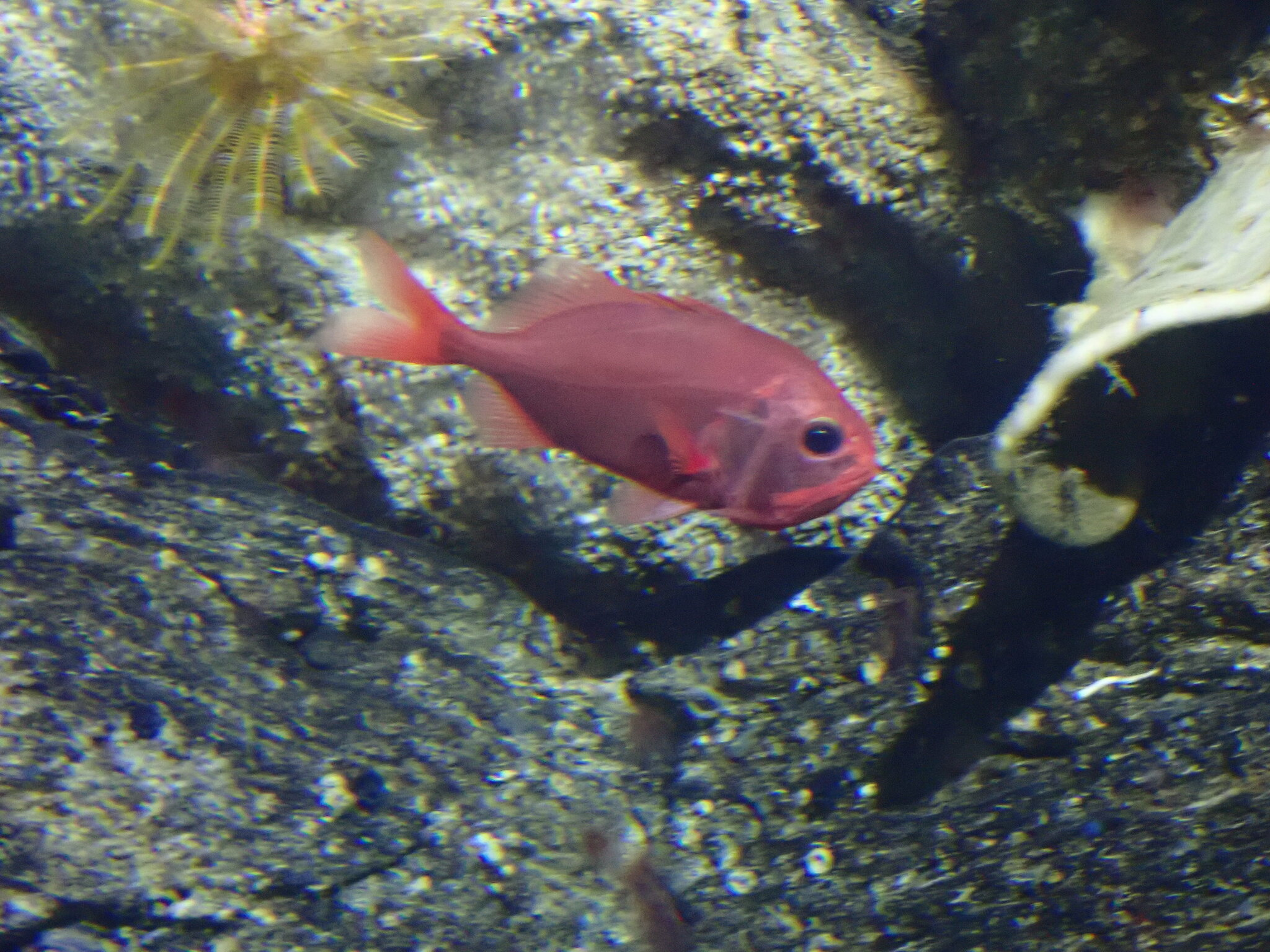

Conservation status
- Least Concern (IUCN 3.1)

Scientific classification
- Kingdom: Animalia
- Phylum: Chordata
- Class: Actinopterygii
- Division: Teleostei
- Order: Trachichthyiformes
- Family: Trachichthyidae
- Genus: Gephyroberyx
- Species: G. darwinii

Binomial name
- Gephyroberyx darwinii J. Y. Johnson, 1866

Synonyms
- List: Trachichthys darwini Johnson, 1866; Trachichthys darwinii Johnson, 1866; Gephyroberys darwinii (Johnson, 1866); Gephyroberyx darwini (Johnson, 1866); Gephyroberyx philippinus Fowler, 1938; Gephyroberyx orbicularis Smith, 1947; Gephyroberyx robustus Danil'chenko, 1960

= Gephyroberyx darwinii =

Species of fish

Gephyroberyx darwinii, the big roughy or Darwin's slimehead, is a species of fish in the slimehead family found widely in the Atlantic and Indo-Pacific oceans. This deep-sea species reaches a length of 60 cm (2.0 ft) and is mainly found at depths of 200 to 500 m (660–1,640 ft), but has been recorded between 9 and 1,210 m (30–3,970 ft). Based on broadly overlapping morphological features it sometimes (e.g., by IUCN) includes G. japonicus as a synonym.

Typical of Trachichthyidae, G. darwinii are laterally compressed, with a deep body, and have mucous-filled cavities within their heads. They possess large mouths with teeth on the vomer and palatine, large spines on their opercular bones, a ventral keel bearing robust scutes, and a forked tail. The species tends to be reddish in color. The species can be distinguished from sympatric Hoplostethus species by the presence of eight spines on the first dorsal fin (with the 3rd and 4th being the longest), spines on the lateral line scales, the opercular spine extending beyond the opercular's rear edge, a concave area between the eyes, and a comparatively small eye diameter.

The big roughy inhabits the upper continental slope, preferring habitats with hard substrates. Off Brazil, they are sometimes caught while fishing for monkfish (Lophius gastrophysus); it is thought that the two species prefers regions with deep-sea coral reefs.

This species is of some commercial interest, being used for fishmeal and oils.
