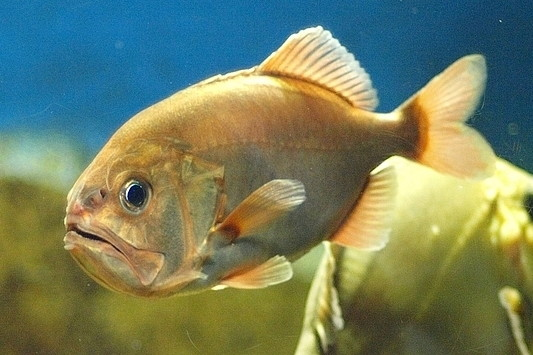
- Big roughy (G. japonicus)

Scientific classification
- Kingdom: Animalia
- Phylum: Chordata
- Class: Actinopterygii
- Order: Trachichthyiformes
- Family: Trachichthyidae
- Genus: Gephyroberyx; Boulenger, 1902

Species
- 1-2, see text

= Gephyroberyx =

Genus of fishes

Gephyroberyx is a genus of fishes in the slimehead family.

== Species ==
Once, three species were placed in this genus, but Gephyroberyx philippinus is now considered to be a synonym of G. darwinii. Based on broadly overlapping morphological features, G. japonicus should also be regarded a synonym of G. darwinii, but both are recognized as valid species by FishBase:

- Gephyroberyx darwinii (J. Y. Johnson, 1866) (Darwin's slimehead)
- Gephyroberyx japonicus (Döderlein, 1883) (big roughy)
