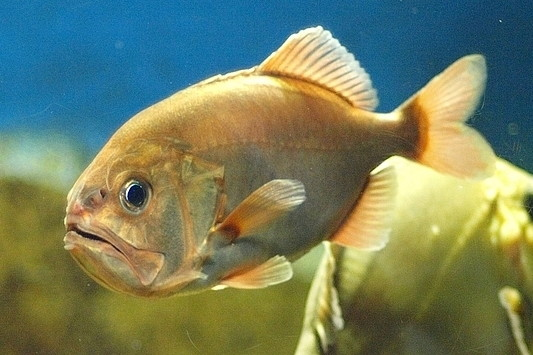

Conservation status
- Least Concern (IUCN 3.1)

Scientific classification
- Kingdom: Animalia
- Phylum: Chordata
- Class: Actinopterygii
- Order: Trachichthyiformes
- Family: Trachichthyidae
- Genus: Gephyroberyx
- Species: G. japonicus

Binomial name
- Gephyroberyx japonicus (Döderlein, 1883)

Synonyms
- Trachichthys japonicus Döderlein, 1883

= Gephyroberyx japonicus =

Species of fish

Gephyroberyx japonicus, the big roughy or blueberry roughy, is a species of fish in the family Trachichthyidae. It is endemic to the northwest Pacific off Japan, Taiwan and Hawaii, and can be found at depths between 300 and 1,500 m (980–4,920 ft). It can reach 30–35 cm (12–14 in) in length. Based on broadly overlapping morphological features it is sometimes (e.g., by IUCN) considered a synonym of G. darwinii.

It is sometimes seen in deep-sea exhibits in public aquariums and it has spawned in captivity.
