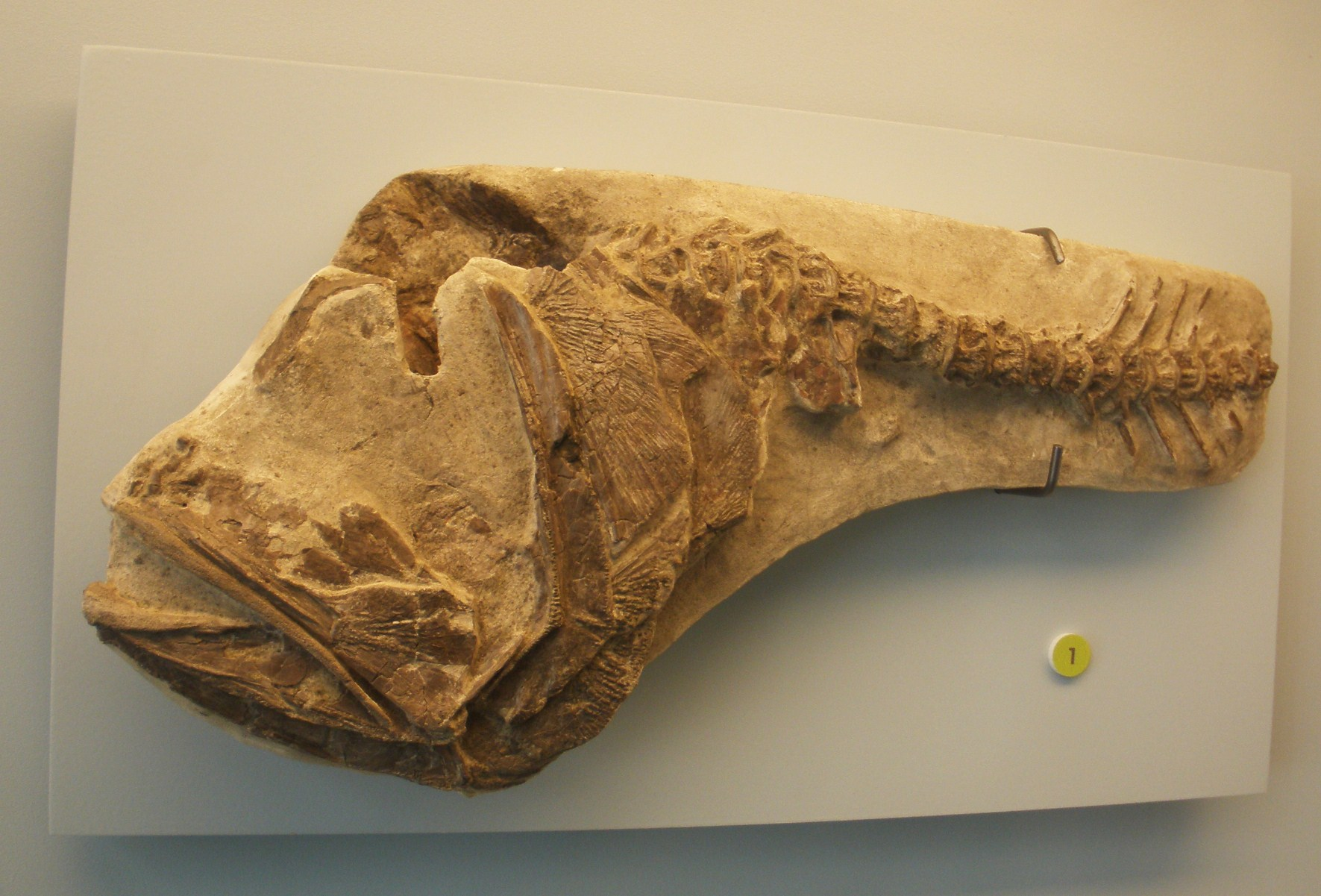
- An undescribed Hoplopteryx from the Maastrichtian of Belgium

Scientific classification
- Kingdom: Animalia
- Phylum: Chordata
- Class: Actinopterygii
- Division: Teleostei
- Order: Trachichthyiformes
- Family: Trachichthyidae
- Genus: †Hoplopteryx; Agassiz, 1838

Type species
- †Hoplopteryx antiquus Agassiz, 1838

Species
- See text

= Hoplopteryx =

Hoplopteryx Temporal range: Late Cretaceous (Cenomanian to Maastrichtian), 97–66 Ma

Extinct genus of fishes

Hoplopteryx is an extinct genus of slimehead from the Late Cretaceous, lasting from the middle of the Cretaceous to the end. It is one of the best-known fossil trachichthyiforms, and was widespread across the Northern Hemisphere, from throughout Europe east to the Middle East and west to North America.

== Taxonomy ==
The following valid species are known:

- H. antiquus Agassiz, 1838 (type species) - late Campanian of Germany (Ahlen Formation)
- H. causae (Nolf, 2003) [otolith] - late Santonian of Spain
- H. coffeesandensis (Nolf & Dockery, 1990) [otolith] - Campanian of Mississippi, US
- H. dakotaensis Grandstaff & Parris, 2016 - Turonian of North Dakota, US (Carlile Shale)
- H. gephyrognathus Patterson, 1964 - Turonian of England (English Chalk)
- H. gibbus von der Marck, 1863 - late Campanian of Germany (Ahlen & Baumberge Formations)
- ?H. insculptus (Cope, 1869) - Maastrichtian of New Jersey, US (Navesink Formation)
- H. langfordi Stringer & Schwarzhans, 2020 [otolith] - early Maastrichtian of Mississippi, US (Coon Creek Formation)
- H. lewesiensis (Mantell, 1822) - mid-Cenomanian to Coniacian of England (English Chalk), Turonian of the Czech Republic (Bilá Hora Formation), Turonian of Voronezh Oblast, Russia, Turonian of France, Campanian of Texas, US (Gober Chalk) (=Zeus lewesiensis Mantell, 1822)
- H. macracanthus Patterson, 1964 - late Coniacian to early Campanian of England (English Chalk)
- H. oscitans (Nolf & Stringer, 1996) [otolith] - Maastrichtian of Mississippi, US (Coon Creek & Owl Creek Formations)
- H. simus Woodward, 1902 - mid-Cenomanian to Coniacian of England (English Chalk)
- H. supracretacea (Koken, 1891) [otolith] - Maastrichtian of Germany
- H. syriacus (Pictet & Humbert, 1866) - Santonian of Lebanon (Sahel Alma)
- H. spinulosus Woodward, 1942 - Santonian of Lebanon (Sahel Alma)
- H. stachei (Gorjanović-Kramberger, 1895) - Cenomanian of Slovenia (Komen Limestone)

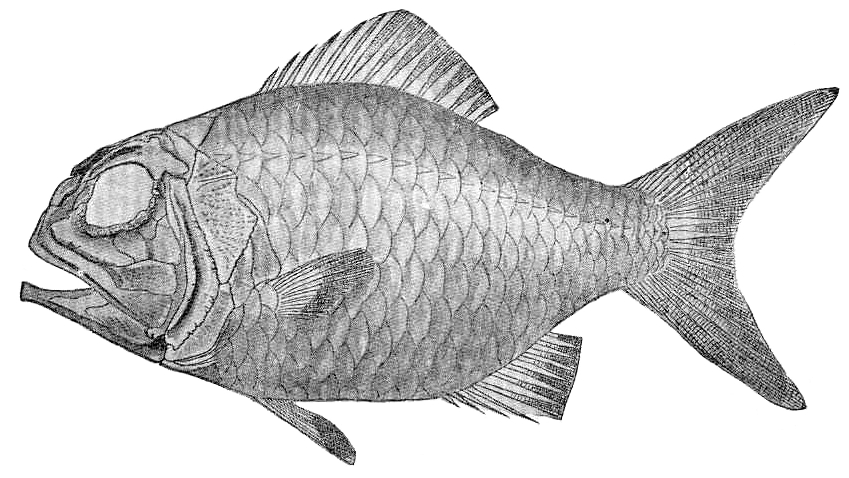
Life restoration of H. lewesiensis

A well-preserved specimen of Hoplopteryx is known from the Maastrichtian-aged Ciply-Malogne Phosphatic Chalk Formation, but still remains undescribed at the species level. Indeterminate remains are also known from the Maastricht Formation.

The species ?H. ('Beryx') insculptus is only known from a well-preserved flank of scales. Although it has been previously attributed to Hoplopteryx, no reasoning has been given for this attribution, and its taxonomy thus remains uncertain. The apparent species "Hoplopteryx" lundensis Davis, 1890 from the Early Paleocene of Limhamns kalkbrott, Sweden has been reclassified into Proserranus. The species "H." lewisi (Davis, 1887) from the Cenomanian-aged Sannine Formation of Lebanon has been reclassified into Stichopteryx.

A well-preserved specimen of H. lewesiensis from the English Chalk with preserved in situ otoliths has allowed for the morphology of Hoplopteryx otoliths to be better understood, and allowed for the placement of several previously enigmatic otolith-based species within this genus. The morphology of Hoplopteryx otoliths appears to closely resemble those of modern derived trachichthyids, especially the extant Trachichthys & Hoplostethus. This clashes with its external morphology, which shows many features not present in modern trachichthyiforms, causing them to be generally considered stem-group trachichthyids.

== Description ==
Hoplopteryx had a dorsal fin supported by nine unjointed, bony rays, deeply forked, homocercal tail, a moderately developed anal fin, and a pelvic fin located well forward. The snout is quite short, the eyes fairly large, and both jaws of the upturned mouth hold small teeth.

Hoplopteryx was at a typical length 27 cm. The abundance of well-preserved Hoplopteryx remains throughout the English Chalk allowed for the construction of a time series measuring the body size of Hoplopteryx over the Cretaceous Thermal Maximum. These measurements suggest that as the climate warmed, the body size of Hoplopteryx significantly decreased

== Habitat ==
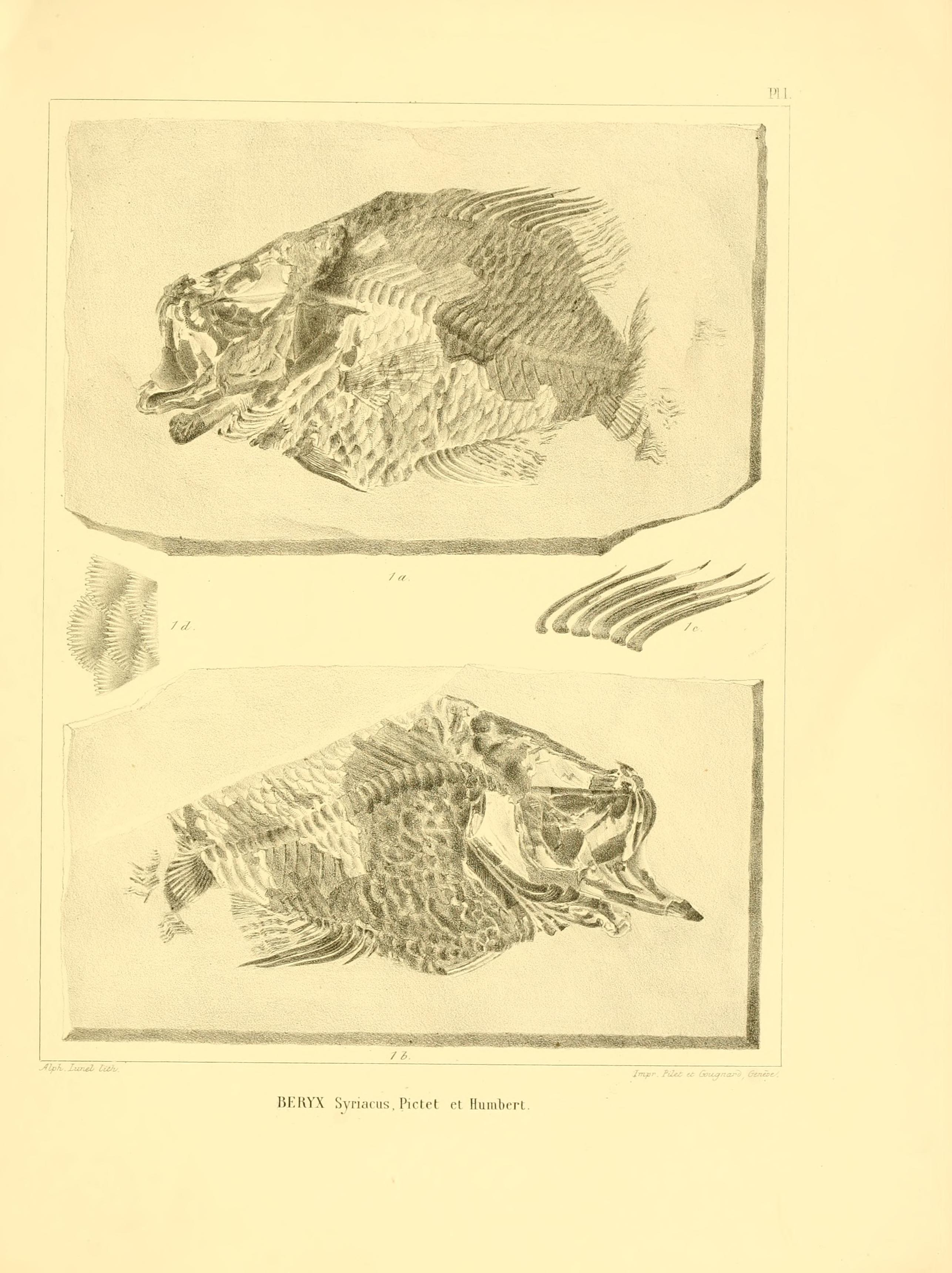
Specimens of H. syriacus from Lebanon

Hoplopteryx was a marine fish, living primarily in shallow chalk seas. They also appear to have been dominant species in certain deepwater habitats as well, such as those that formed within the Mississippi Embayment near the end of the Cretaceous, with Hoplopteryx oscitans being the most common fish otolith found in the Owl Creek Formation.

== Sources ==
- Fossils (Smithsonian Handbooks) by David Ward (Page 219)
- Grandstaff, Barbara S.; Parris, David C. (2016). "A new species of Hoplopteryx from the Carlile Formation (Cretaceous) of South Dakota". Proceedings of the South Dakota Academy of Science. 95: 73–84.
