= Optivus agastos =

Violet roughy

Scientific classification
- Kingdom: Animalia
- Phylum: Chordata
- Class: Actinopterygii
- Order: Trachichthyiformes
- Family: Trachichthyidae
- Genus: Optivus
- Species: O. agastos

Binomial name
- Optivus agastos M. F. Gomon, 2004

Species of fish

Optivus agastos, also known as the violet roughy, is a species in the family Trachichthyidae. It is native to southeast Australia in the temperate waters of the Southwest Pacific and lives near reefs at depths from 1 to 146 metres (3.3 to 479.0 ft). It can reach sizes of up to 9.5 centimetres (3.7 in). Its name, "Optivus", means chosen in Latin, and "agastos" comes from Greek meaning "near kinsman," which refers to its similarity to Optivus elongatus.
