= New Zealand giant sawbelly =

Scientific classification
- Kingdom: Animalia
- Phylum: Chordata
- Class: Actinopterygii
- Division: Teleostei
- Order: Trachichthyiformes
- Family: Trachichthyidae
- Genus: Hoplostethus
- Species: H. melanopeza

Binomial name
- Hoplostethus melanopeza Roberts & Gomon, 2012

Species of fish

The New Zealand giant sawbelly (Hoplostethus melanopeza) is a slimehead of the order Beryciformes. It is native to the South Pacific, more specifically the sub-tropical and temperate latitudes of the Tasman and South Fiji basins. It is also found along Australia's southeastern coast, the Bay of Plenty, and southern Kermadec Ridge at the north end of New Zealand's North Island. It can reach sizes of up to 51.5 cm (20.3 in) SL. Its natural habitats are "continental slopes, seamounts, and submarine rises" between 250–400 m (820–1,310 ft), though it has been found as shallow as 140 metres (460 ft) and as deep as 760 m (2,490 ft). The first H. melanopeza caught were thought to be individuals of the H. gigas species, and it was not distinguished as a separate species until much later. One key difference between the two is that although both are red, H. melanopeza has black fin margins.
