= Hoplostethus mikhailini =

Scientific classification
- Kingdom: Animalia
- Phylum: Chordata
- Class: Actinopterygii
- Order: Trachichthyiformes
- Family: Trachichthyidae
- Genus: Hoplostethus
- Species: H. mikhailini

Binomial name
- Hoplostethus mikhailini Kotlyar, 1986

Species of fish

Hoplostethus mikhailini is a deepwater species of the family Trachichthyidae. It is native to the Southeast Atlantic and Western Indian Ocean from the Cape of Good Hope to Delagoa Bay where it lives as depths ranging from 273 to 525 metres (896 to 1,722 ft). It can reach sizes of up to 14.7 centimetres (5.8 in) SL.
