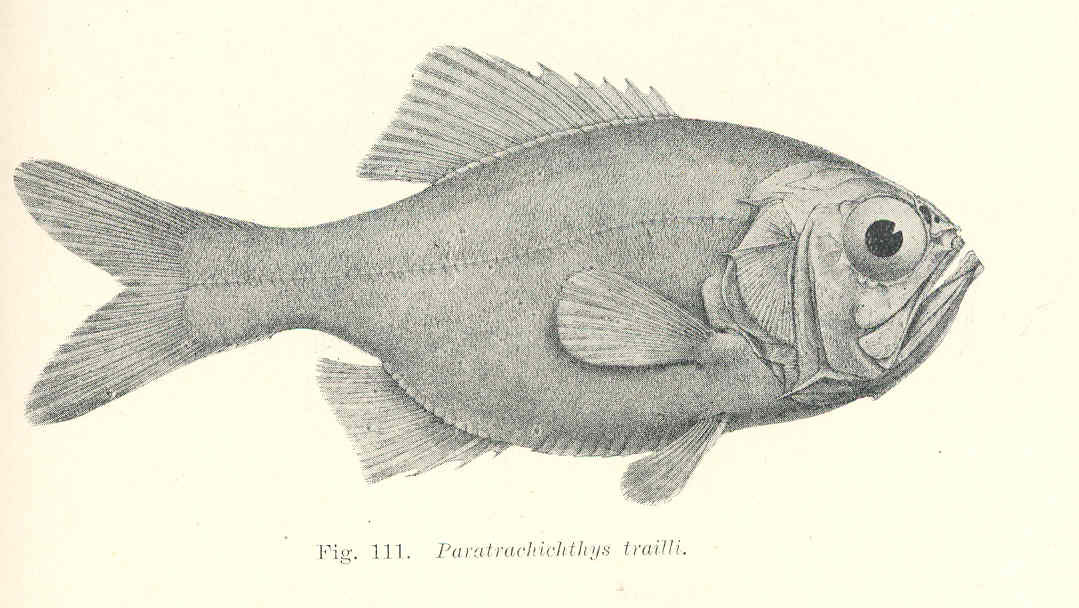

Scientific classification
- Kingdom: Animalia
- Phylum: Chordata
- Class: Actinopterygii
- Order: Trachichthyiformes
- Family: Trachichthyidae
- Genus: Paratrachichthys
- Species: P. trailli

Binomial name
- Paratrachichthys trailli (F. W. Hutton, 1875)

= Paratrachichthys trailli =

Sandpaper fish

Species of fish

Paratrachichthys trailli, commonly known as the sandpaper fish, is a slimehead belonging to the family Trachichthyidae, found in New Zealand and possibly Australia at depths of between 20 and 500 metres (66 and 1,640 ft). It can reach lengths of up to 25 centimetres (9.8 in).
