= Black slimehead =

Conservation status
- Least Concern (IUCN 3.1)

Scientific classification
- Kingdom: Animalia
- Phylum: Chordata
- Class: Actinopterygii
- Order: Trachichthyiformes
- Family: Trachichthyidae
- Genus: Hoplostethus
- Species: H. cadenati

Binomial name
- Hoplostethus cadenati Quéro, 1974

Species of fish

The black slimehead (Hoplostethus cadenati) is a member of the order Beryciformes. It is found along the coast of northwest Africa from Cape Verde down to South Africa. It typically lives near the ocean floor 200–700 m (660–2,300 ft) deep, but can be found up ranging from 70–1,000 m (230–3,280 ft) deep. It can reach lengths of up to 30 cm (12 in).
