= Thickspine roughy =

Scientific classification
- Domain: Eukaryota
- Kingdom: Animalia
- Phylum: Chordata
- Class: Actinopterygii
- Order: Trachichthyiformes
- Family: Trachichthyidae
- Genus: Hoplostethus
- Species: H. robustispinus

Binomial name
- Hoplostethus robustispinus Moore & Dodd, 2010

Species of fish

The thickspine roughy (Hoplostethus robustispinus) is a slimehead of the order Beryciformes. It is native to the Northwestern Pacific near the Philippines and Japan where it can be found as deep as 660 m (2,170 ft). It can reach sizes of up to 35.4 cm (13.9 in) SL.
