= Hoplostethus crassispinus =

Conservation status
- Least Concern (IUCN 3.1)

Scientific classification
- Kingdom: Animalia
- Phylum: Chordata
- Class: Actinopterygii
- Order: Trachichthyiformes
- Family: Trachichthyidae
- Genus: Hoplostethus
- Species: H. crassispinus

Binomial name
- Hoplostethus crassispinus Kotlyar, 1980

Species of fish

Hoplostethus crassispinus is a species of slimehead found in the Pacific Ocean. It can be found in Hawaii and the Kyushu–Palau Ridge and possibly off the coast of Vietnam. It lives at depths between 280 and 600 m (920 and 1,970 ft) and can reach sizes of up to 25.4 cm (10.0 in).
