= Red Sea roughy =

Conservation status
- Data Deficient (IUCN 3.1)

Scientific classification
- Kingdom: Animalia
- Phylum: Chordata
- Class: Actinopterygii
- Order: Trachichthyiformes
- Family: Trachichthyidae
- Genus: Hoplostethus
- Species: H. marisrubri

Binomial name
- Hoplostethus marisrubri Kotlyar, 1986

Species of fish

The Red Sea roughy (Hoplostethus marisrubri) is a slimehead of the order Beryciformes. It is found in the Western Indian Ocean and the Red Sea at depths of up to 520 m (1,710 ft). It can reach sizes of up to 12.2 cm (4.8 in) SL. The species is known from only five specimens.
