= Hoplostethus rubellopterus =

Scientific classification
- Kingdom: Animalia
- Phylum: Chordata
- Class: Actinopterygii
- Order: Trachichthyiformes
- Family: Trachichthyidae
- Genus: Hoplostethus
- Species: H. rubellopterus

Binomial name
- Hoplostethus rubellopterus Kotlyar, 1980

Species of fish

Hoplostethus rubellopterus, is a small deep-sea fish species belonging to the slimehead family (Trachichthyidae).

It is found in the Indian Ocean (identified near Somalia and Mentawai Ridge, Indonesia). Hoplostethus rubellopterus is commonly found at deep depths, ranging from 160 meters to 800 meters, and, due to the characterization within the genus, is often mistaken for H. mediterraneus. This species can be identified by a medium, oval body, a large head that composes roughly 45% of its entire length with large eyes, a rounded snout with thin skin, and an angled wide mouth.
