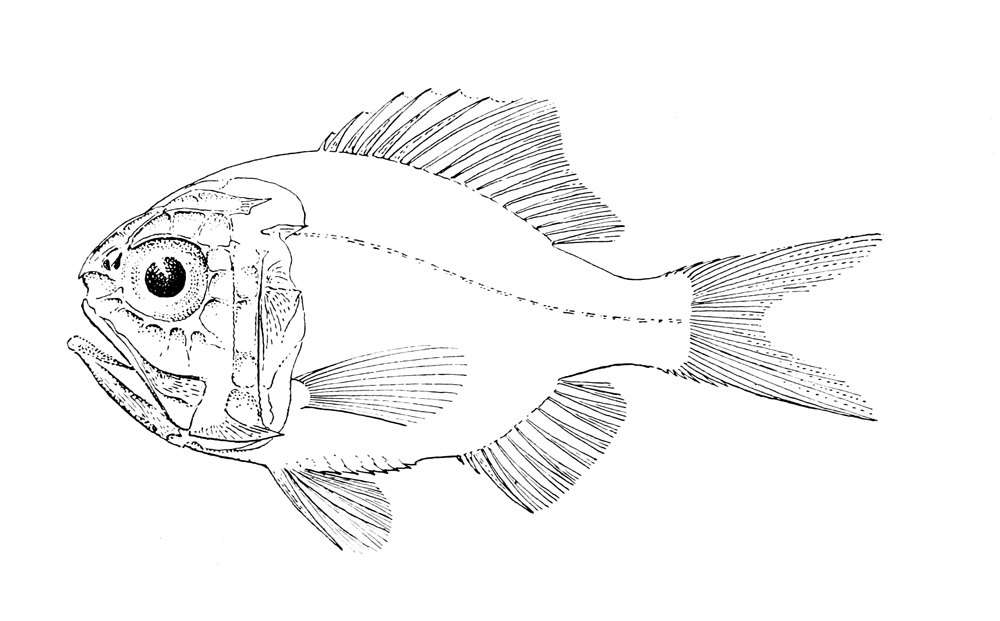

Scientific classification
- Kingdom: Animalia
- Phylum: Chordata
- Class: Actinopterygii
- Order: Trachichthyiformes
- Family: Trachichthyidae
- Genus: Hoplostethus
- Species: H. latus

Binomial name
- Hoplostethus latus McCulloch, 1914

= Palefin sawbelly =

Species of fish

The palefin sawbelly (Hoplostethus latus) is a medium-sized deep-sea fish species belonging to the slimehead family. It is native to Australia's southern waters and the Eastern Indian Ocean where it lives at depths between 146 and 586 metres (479 and 1,923 ft) on the continental slope and continental shelf. It can reach sizes of up to 53.0 centimetres (20.9 in) TL.
