= Hoplostethus rifti =

Scientific classification
- Kingdom: Animalia
- Phylum: Chordata
- Class: Actinopterygii
- Order: Trachichthyiformes
- Family: Trachichthyidae
- Genus: Hoplostethus
- Species: H. rifti

Binomial name
- Hoplostethus rifti Kotlyar, 1986

Species of fish

Hoplostethus rifti is a member of the family Trachichthyidae It is found in the Western Indian Ocean around northern tip of Madagascar at depths of up to 500 metres (1,600 ft). It can reach sizes of up to 7.5 centimetres (3.0 in) SL.
