= Blackfin roughy =

Scientific classification
- Kingdom: Animalia
- Phylum: Chordata
- Class: Actinopterygii
- Order: Trachichthyiformes
- Family: Trachichthyidae
- Genus: Hoplostethus
- Species: H. melanopterus

Binomial name
- Hoplostethus melanopterus Fowler, 1938

Species of fish

The blackfin roughy (Hoplostethus melanopterus) is a slimehead of the order Beryciformes. It has a very wide distribution across the Atlantic, Pacific, and Indian Oceans. It can reach sizes of up to 14.0 cm (5.5 in) TL. It is a deepwater fish, living between 454–1,500 m (1,490–4,921 ft) deep.
