= Hoplostethus tenebricus =

Scientific classification
- Kingdom: Animalia
- Phylum: Chordata
- Class: Actinopterygii
- Order: Trachichthyiformes
- Family: Trachichthyidae
- Genus: Hoplostethus
- Species: H. tenebricus

Binomial name
- Hoplostethus tenebricus Kotlyar, 1980

Species of fish

Hoplostethus tenebricus is a small deep-sea fish species belonging to the slimehead family (Trachichthyidae).

== Location ==
It is found in the Western Indian Ocean (known only from Delagoa Bay, Mozambique).

== Habitat ==
The habitat of Hoplostethus tenebricus can be found in a marine environment within a deep-water range.

== Size ==
The average length of Hoplostethus tenebricus is about 21 cm (8.3 in).
