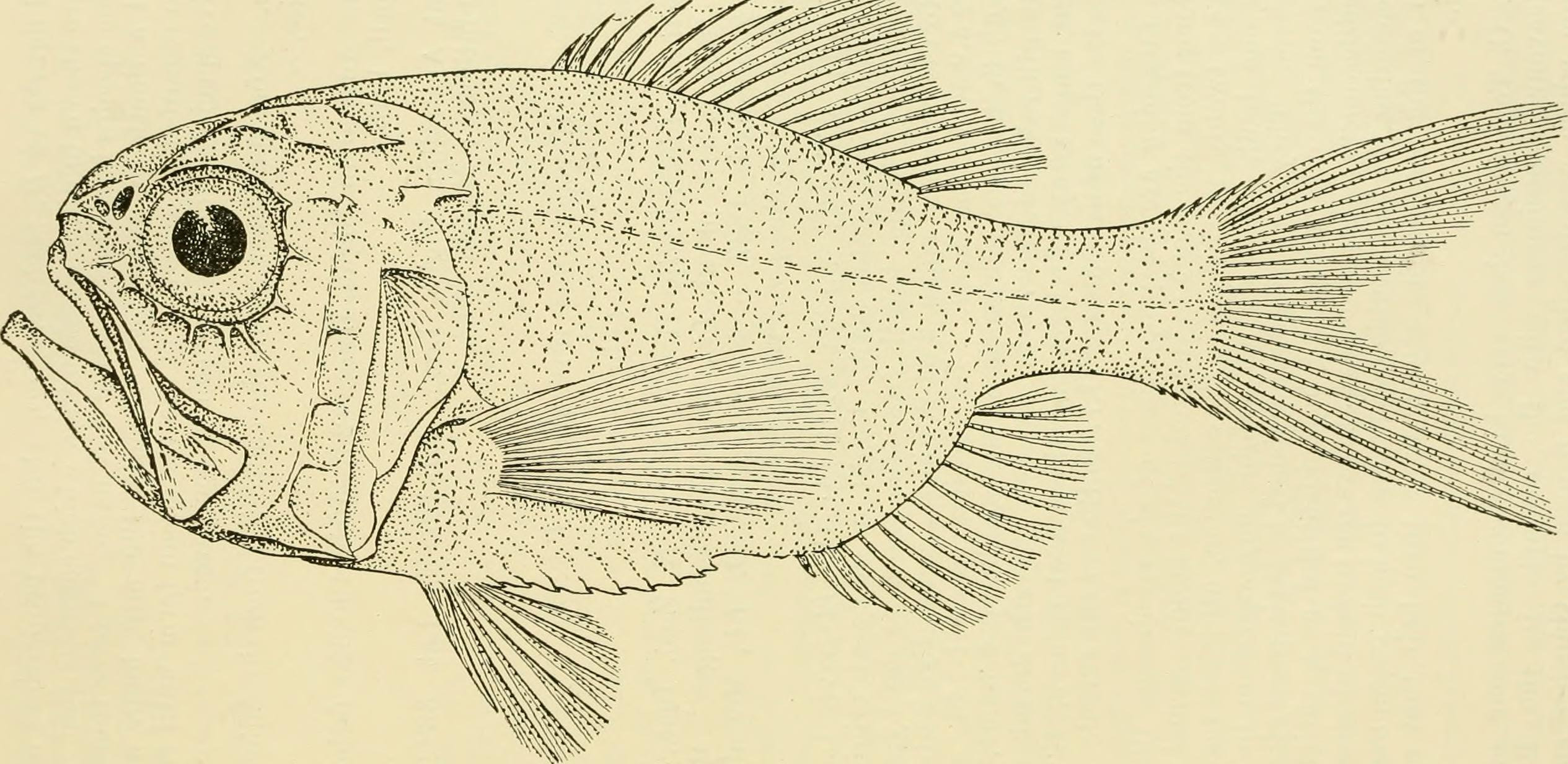

Scientific classification
- Kingdom: Animalia
- Phylum: Chordata
- Class: Actinopterygii
- Order: Trachichthyiformes
- Family: Trachichthyidae
- Genus: Hoplostethus
- Species: H. intermedius

Binomial name
- Hoplostethus intermedius McCulloch, 1914

= Blacktip sawbelly =

Species of fish

The blacktip sawbelly (Hoplostethus intermedius) is a small deep-sea fish species belonging to the slimehead family (Trachichthyidae). It is found off southern Australia and New Zealand. It ranges at depths from 200 to 680 metres (660 to 2,230 ft) where it lives on the continental shelf and continental slope. It can reach sizes of up to 18.0 centimetres (7.1 in).
