= Paratrachichthys macleayi =

Australian sandpaper fish

Scientific classification
- Kingdom: Animalia
- Phylum: Chordata
- Class: Actinopterygii
- Order: Trachichthyiformes
- Family: Trachichthyidae
- Genus: Paratrachichthys
- Species: P. macleayi

Binomial name
- Paratrachichthys macleayi (Johnston, 1881)

Synonyms
- Trachichthys macleayi Johnston, 1881

Species of fish

Paratrachichthys macleayi, also known as the Australian sandpaper fish, is a slimehead belonging to the family Trachichthyidae. It is endemic to southeastern Australia and can be found in small schools in open rocky reefs from depths of 15m to 400m.
