= Hoplostethus fedorovi =

Conservation status
- Data Deficient (IUCN 3.1)

Scientific classification
- Kingdom: Animalia
- Phylum: Chordata
- Class: Actinopterygii
- Order: Trachichthyiformes
- Family: Trachichthyidae
- Genus: Hoplostethus
- Species: H. fedorovi

Binomial name
- Hoplostethus fedorovi Kotlyar, 1986

Species of fish

Hoplostethus fedorovi is a small deep-sea fish species belonging to the slimehead family (Trachichthyidae).

== Distribution ==
It is found in the Western Central Pacific (a holotype from the Marcus-Necker ridge).

== Environment ==
Hoplostethus fedorovi is recorded to be found within a marine environment within a bathypelagic or benthopelagic depth range. This species is occupied in the depth range of about 500–520 metres (1,640–1,710 ft). They are commonly known to be a deep water species.

== Size ==
Hoplostethus fedorovi was can reach the maximum recorded length of about 15.9 centimetres or about 6.25 inches as an unsexed male.

== Threats ==
Hoplostethus fedorovi serves as no threat to humans. They are recorded to be a harmless species.
