= Western Pacific roughy =

Scientific classification
- Kingdom: Animalia
- Phylum: Chordata
- Class: Actinopterygii
- Division: Teleostei
- Order: Trachichthyiformes
- Family: Trachichthyidae
- Genus: Hoplostethus
- Species: H. japonicus

Binomial name
- Hoplostethus japonicus (Hilgendorf, 1879)

Species of fish

The Western Pacific roughy (Hoplostethus japonicus) is a species of slimehead found in the Northwest Pacific along Japan's southern coast in Sagami Bay, Suruga Bay, and the Sea of Japan. It can reach up to 12.6 cm (5.0 in) SL and its depth range is 336–605 m (1,102–1,985 ft).
