= Eastern Pacific roughy =

Scientific classification
- Kingdom: Animalia
- Phylum: Chordata
- Class: Actinopterygii
- Order: Trachichthyiformes
- Family: Trachichthyidae
- Genus: Hoplostethus
- Species: H. pacificus

Binomial name
- Hoplostethus pacificus Garman, 1899

Species of fish

The eastern Pacific roughy (Hoplostethus pacificus) is a slimehead of the order Beryciformes. It is found in the Southeast Pacific from Ecuador and the Galápagos Islands to Peru. It can be found as deep as 703 m (2,306 ft).
