= Smallscale slimehead =

Scientific classification
- Kingdom: Animalia
- Phylum: Chordata
- Class: Actinopterygii
- Order: Trachichthyiformes
- Family: Trachichthyidae
- Genus: Hoplostethus
- Species: H. melanopus

Binomial name
- Hoplostethus melanopus (Weber, 1913)

Synonyms
- Leiogaster melanopus Weber, 1913; Hoplostethus natalensis Kotlyar, 1978; Hoplostethus mediterraneus (Cuvier, 1829); Hoplostethus atlanticus (Collett, 1889)

Species of fish

The smallscale slimehead (Hoplostethus melanopus) is a deepwater fish of the family Trachichthyidae. It lives on the continental shelf at a depths of 400–914 m (1,312–2,999 ft). It can reach sizes of up to 25.0 cm (9.8 in) TL. It is a brownish-grey color with blackish fins. It is found in the Indian and Pacific Oceans along the coasts of South Africa, Somalia, the United Arab Emirates, Madagascar, Japan, Indonesia, and Namibia.
