= Hoplostethus druzhinini =

Conservation status
- Least Concern (IUCN 3.1)

Scientific classification
- Kingdom: Animalia
- Phylum: Chordata
- Class: Actinopterygii
- Order: Trachichthyiformes
- Family: Trachichthyidae
- Genus: Hoplostethus
- Species: H. druzhinini

Binomial name
- Hoplostethus druzhinini Kotlyar, 1986

Species of fish

Hoplostethus druzhinini is a species of slimehead native to the western Indian Ocean off the coast of Yemen. It lives in deep water between 330 and 445 m (1,080 and 1,460 ft) and can reach sizes of up to 13.1 cm (5.2 in).
