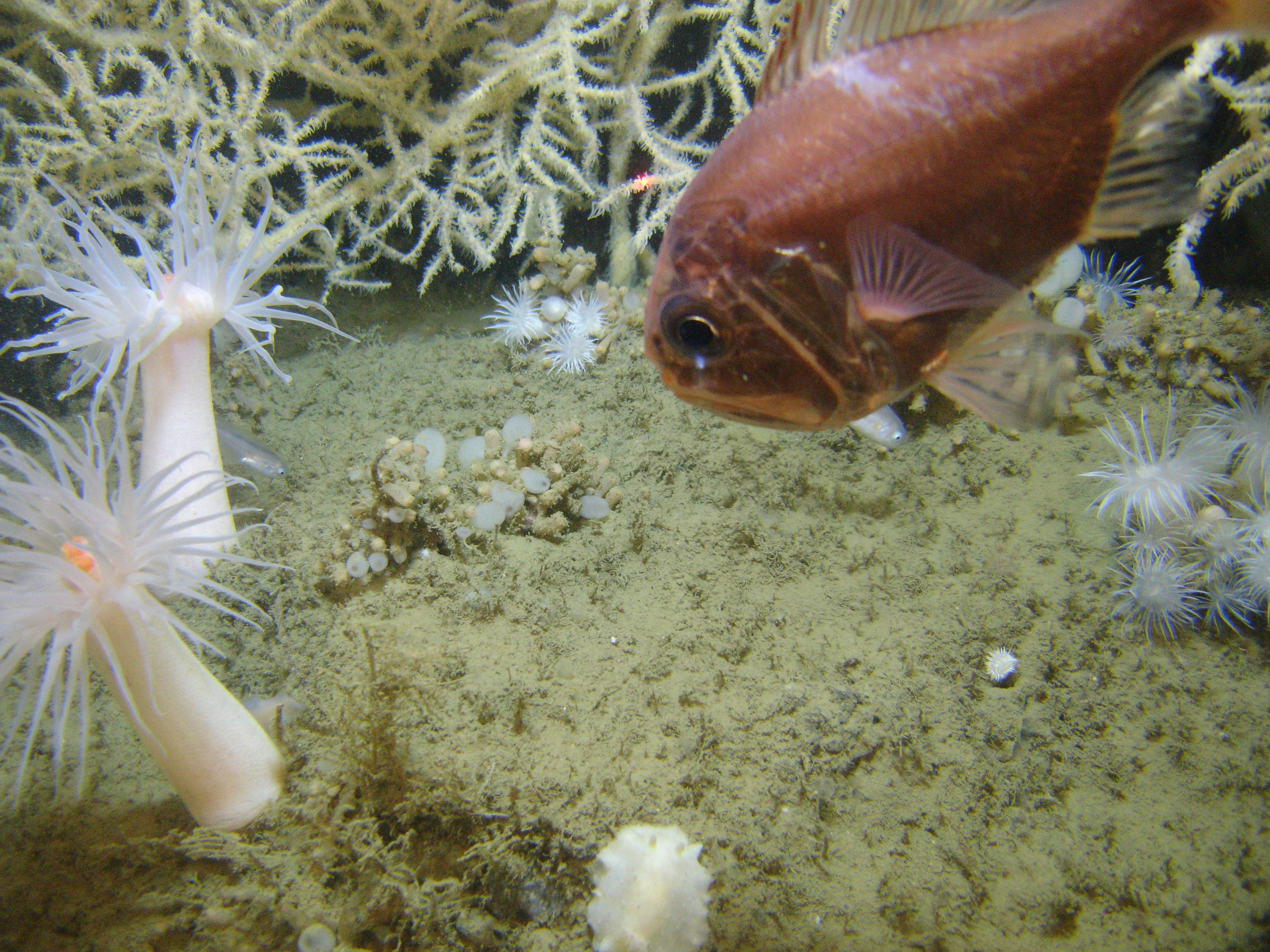
- Atlantic roughy at the base of a large black coral colony.

Scientific classification
- Kingdom: Animalia
- Phylum: Chordata
- Class: Actinopterygii
- Order: Trachichthyiformes
- Family: Trachichthyidae
- Genus: Hoplostethus
- Species: H. occidentalis

Binomial name
- Hoplostethus occidentalis Woods, 1973

= Hoplostethus occidentalis =

Species of fish

Hoplostethus occidentalis, more commonly known as the Atlantic roughy or western roughy, is a member of the family Trachichthyidae. It has a wide distribution in the Atlantic Ocean ranging from as far south as Brazil all the way to southern Nova Scotia. It is a deepwater fish, living at depths between 485 and 550 metres (1,591 and 1,804 ft). It can reach lengths of up to 17.3 centimetres (6.8 in) SL.
