= Hoplostethus confinis =

Conservation status
- Least Concern (IUCN 3.1)

Scientific classification
- Kingdom: Animalia
- Phylum: Chordata
- Class: Actinopterygii
- Order: Trachichthyiformes
- Family: Trachichthyidae
- Genus: Hoplostethus
- Species: H. confinis

Binomial name
- Hoplostethus confinis Kotlyar, 1980

Species of fish

Hoplostethus confinis is a species of slimehead native to the Andaman Sea in the Indian Ocean. It lives in deep water between 290 and 330 m (950 and 1,080 ft) from the surface and can reach sizes of up to 12.3 cm (4.8 in).
