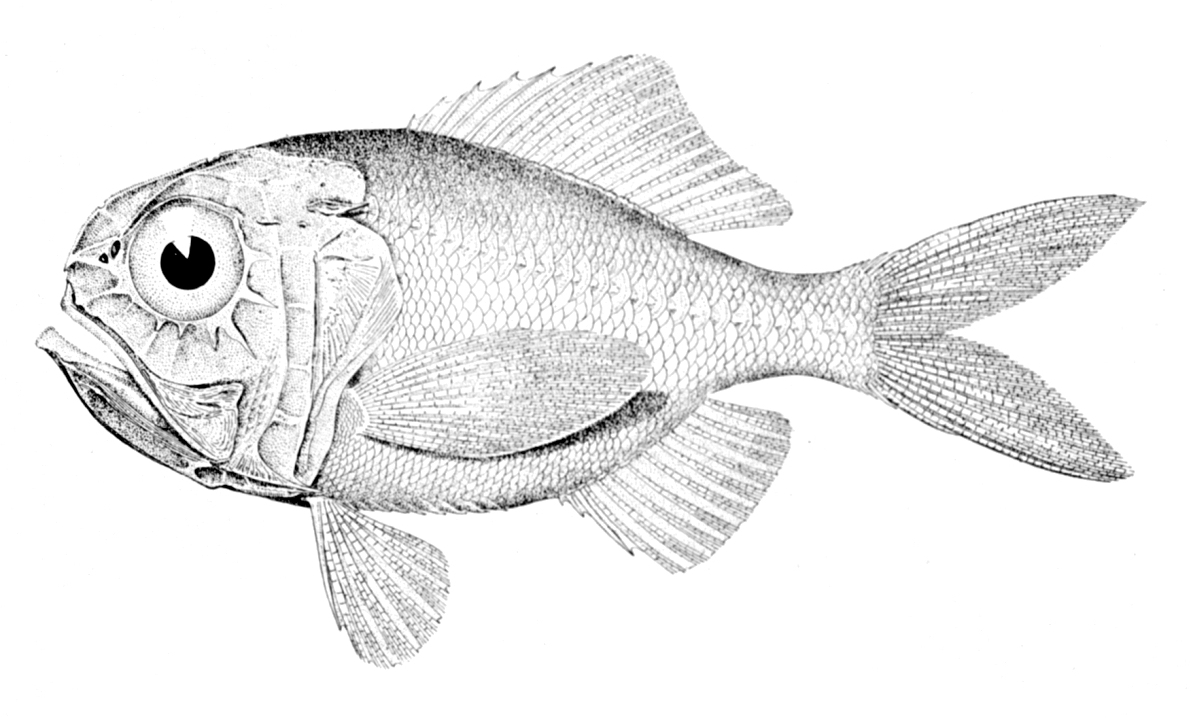

Scientific classification
- Kingdom: Animalia
- Phylum: Chordata
- Class: Actinopterygii
- Order: Trachichthyiformes
- Family: Trachichthyidae
- Genus: Hoplostethus
- Species: H. mediterraneus

Binomial name
- Hoplostethus mediterraneus Cuvier, 1829

= Silver roughy =

Subspecies of fish

The silver roughy or Mediterranean slimehead (Hoplostethus mediterraneus) is a small deep-sea fish species belonging to the slimehead family (Trachichthyidae). It is recognized as a bony fish and is metallic with orange to red fins. It is found widely at depths of 100 to 1,175 m (328–3,855 ft) in the Atlantic, ranging from Iceland and Georges Bank in the north to South Africa and Brazil in the south, including the Mediterranean and Gulf of Mexico. It is also found in the Western Indian Ocean, including the Red Sea.
