= Paratrachichthys fernandezianus =

Chilean sandpaper fish

Conservation status
- Least Concern (IUCN 3.1)

Scientific classification
- Kingdom: Animalia
- Phylum: Chordata
- Class: Actinopterygii
- Order: Trachichthyiformes
- Family: Trachichthyidae
- Genus: Paratrachichthys
- Species: P. fernandezianus

Binomial name
- Paratrachichthys fernandezianus (Günther, 1887)

Synonyms
- Aulotrachichthys fernandezianus (Günther, 1887); Trachichthys fernandezianus Günther, 1887

Species of fish

Paratrachichthys fernandezianus, the Chilean sandpaper fish, is a member of the family Trachichthyidae. It is native to the Desventuradas Islands and the Juan Fernández Islands off the coast of Chile. Despite its relatively limited range, it is listed as least concern by the IUCN because its population is not threatened at present. The Juan Fernández Islands are a marine reserve and the Desventuradas Islands are mostly uninhabited. It can be found between 0m and 20m from the surface of the ocean, also known as the photic zone.
