= Hoplostethus abramovi =

Conservation status
- Data Deficient (IUCN 3.1)

Scientific classification
- Kingdom: Animalia
- Phylum: Chordata
- Class: Actinopterygii
- Order: Trachichthyiformes
- Family: Trachichthyidae
- Genus: Hoplostethus
- Species: H. abramovi

Binomial name
- Hoplostethus abramovi Kotlyar, 1986

Species of fish

Hoplostethus abramovi is a slimehead belonging to the family Trachichthyidae. It is native to northern Madagascar in the west Indian Ocean and lives in deep water up to 300 metres (980 ft) below the surface. It can reach a maximum length of 19 centimetres (7.5 in).
