= Optivus agrammus =

Western roughy

Scientific classification
- Kingdom: Animalia
- Phylum: Chordata
- Class: Actinopterygii
- Order: Trachichthyiformes
- Family: Trachichthyidae
- Genus: Optivus
- Species: O. agrammus

Binomial name
- Optivus agrammus M. F. Gomon, 2004

Species of fish

Optivus agrammus, the western roughy, is a member of the family Trachichthyidae. It is endemic to south and west Australia in the eastern Indian Ocean where it lives in temperate reefs in depths of 40 to 320 metres (130 to 1,050 ft). It can reach lengths of 9.1 centimetres (3.6 in). Its name, "Optivus agrammus," comes from Latin: "Optivus" means "chosen"; and Greek: "agrammus" refers to the lack of stripes on its caudal fin.
