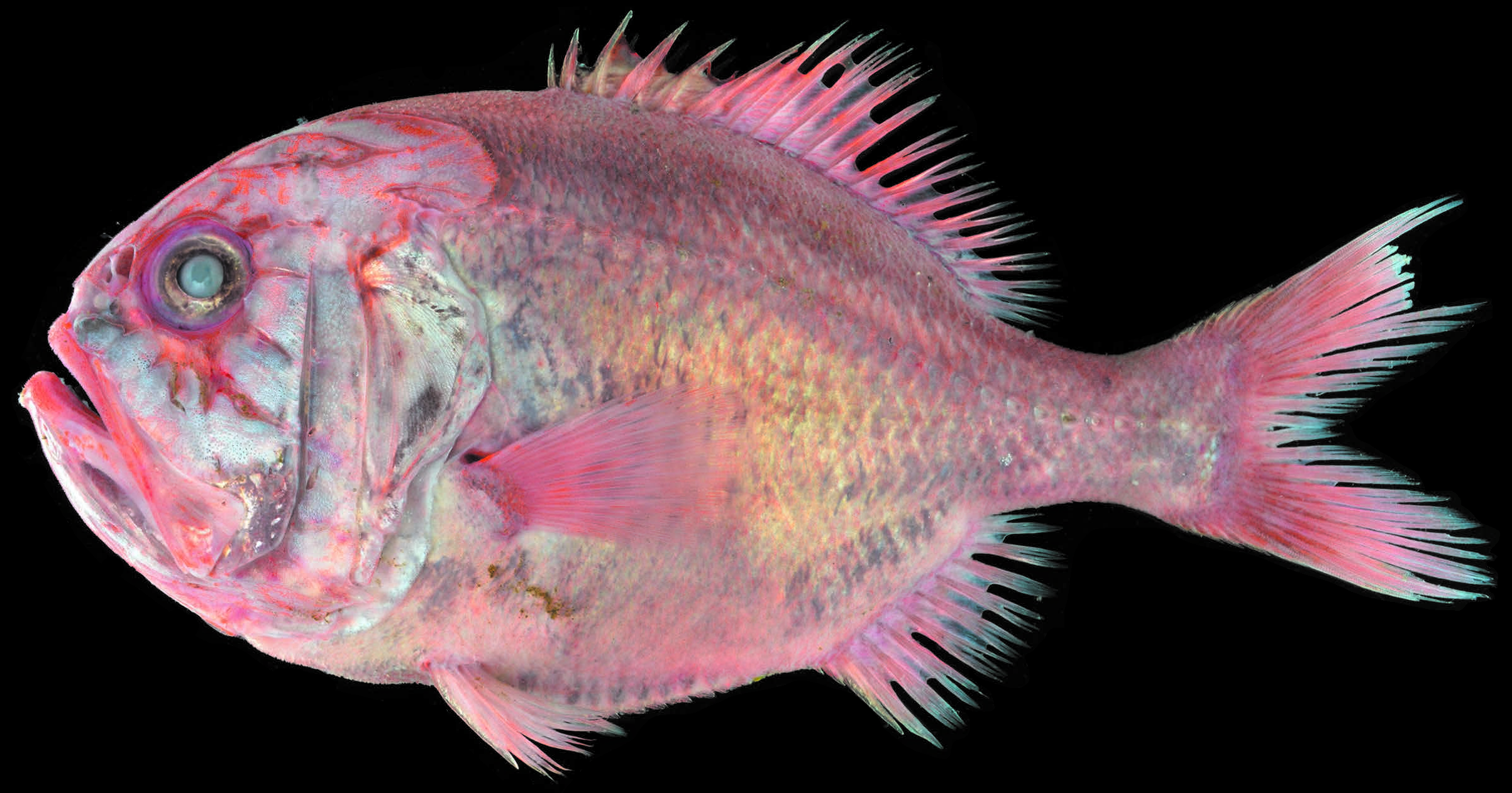

Conservation status
- Data Deficient (IUCN 3.1)

Scientific classification
- Kingdom: Animalia
- Phylum: Chordata
- Class: Actinopterygii
- Order: Trachichthyiformes
- Family: Trachichthyidae
- Genus: Hoplostethus
- Species: H. grandperrini

Binomial name
- Hoplostethus grandperrini C. D. Roberts & M. F. Gomon, 2012

= Hoplostethus grandperrini =

Species of fish

Hoplostethus grandperrini, or Grandperrin's giant sawbelly, is a slimehead native to the Norfolk Ridge and waters off southern New Caledonia at 500–675 m (1,640–2,210 ft) in depth. It was named after Dr. René Grandperrin, a retired chief scientist who worked at ORSTOM Nouméa. It can reach lengths of up to 45.5 cm (17.9 in).
