= Metallic roughy =

Conservation status
- Data Deficient (IUCN 3.1)

Scientific classification
- Kingdom: Animalia
- Phylum: Chordata
- Class: Actinopterygii
- Order: Trachichthyiformes
- Family: Trachichthyidae
- Genus: Hoplostethus
- Species: H. metallicus

Binomial name
- Hoplostethus metallicus Fowler, 1938

Species of fish

The metallic roughy (Hoplostethus metallicus) is a slimehead of the order Trachichthyiformes. It is native to the Western Central Pacific along the eastern seaboard of Negros Island in the Philippines and other locations in the Sulu Sea. It has a deep-water range of 55–550 m (180–1,800 ft). The species is unique within its genus for having a tubular light organ on either side of the belly. It is known from only 25 collected specimens, but members of this genus are known to frequently be "locally abundant," occurring in dense schools over seamounts.
