= Hoplostethus fragilis =

Conservation status
- Data Deficient (IUCN 3.1)

Scientific classification
- Kingdom: Animalia
- Phylum: Chordata
- Class: Actinopterygii
- Order: Trachichthyiformes
- Family: Trachichthyidae
- Genus: Hoplostethus
- Species: H. fragilis

Binomial name
- Hoplostethus fragilis (F. de Buen, 1959)

Synonyms
- Leiogaster fragilis de Buen, 1959

Species of fish

Hoplostethus fragilis, the Chilean roughy, is a slimehead native to the Valparaíso region of Chile in the southeast Pacific. It lives at depths between 250 and 350 m (820 and 1,150 ft). It has been known to contain high levels of mercury.
