= Hoplostethus mento =

Scientific classification
- Kingdom: Animalia
- Phylum: Chordata
- Class: Actinopterygii
- Order: Trachichthyiformes
- Family: Trachichthyidae
- Genus: Hoplostethus
- Species: H. mento

Binomial name
- Hoplostethus mento (Garman, 1899)

Synonyms
- Trachichthys mento Garman, 1899

Species of fish

Hoplostethus mento, more commonly known as the slimy head, is a member of the family Trachichthyidae. It is native to the Eastern Pacific from the Bay of Panama to Valparaiso, Chile. It can reach sizes of up to 12.0 centimetres (4.7 in) TL. It is a deepwater fish, living in a range of 725 to 1,355 metres (2,379 to 4,446 ft) below the surface.
