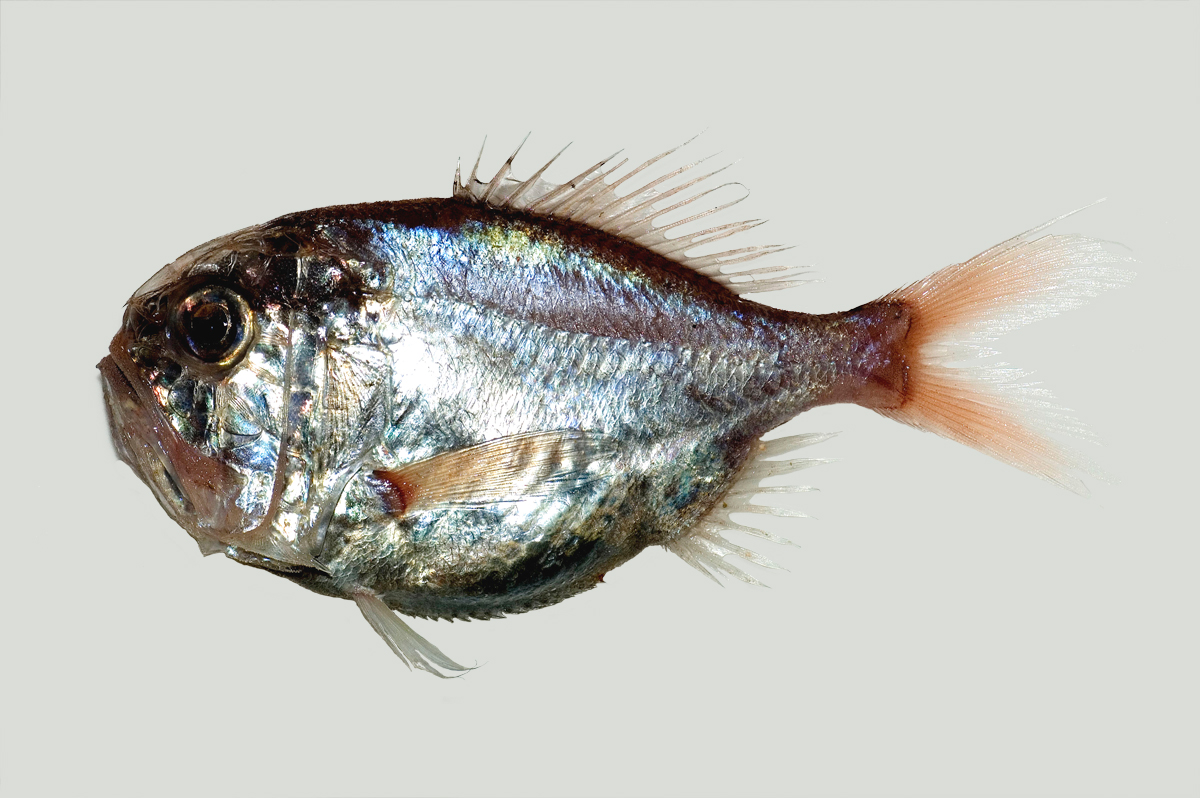

Scientific classification
- Kingdom: Animalia
- Phylum: Chordata
- Class: Actinopterygii
- Order: Trachichthyiformes
- Family: Trachichthyidae
- Genus: Hoplostethus
- Species: H. ravurictus

Binomial name
- Hoplostethus ravurictus Gomon, 2008

= Hoplostethus ravurictus =

Species of fish

Hoplostethus ravurictus is a member of the family Trachichthyidae It is native to the Eastern Indian Ocean off Australia's western coast where it can be found at depths of between 250 and 1,000 metres (820 and 3,280 ft). It can reach sizes of up to 14.1 centimetres (5.6 in) SL.
