= Hoplostethus vniro =

Conservation status
- Data Deficient (IUCN 3.1)

Scientific classification
- Kingdom: Animalia
- Phylum: Chordata
- Class: Actinopterygii
- Order: Trachichthyiformes
- Family: Trachichthyidae
- Genus: Hoplostethus
- Species: H. vniro

Binomial name
- Hoplostethus vniro Kotlyar, 1995

Species of fish

Hoplostethus vniro is a small deep-sea fish species belonging to the slimehead family (Trachichthyidae). It is found in the eastern Central Atlantic in marine environment within a bathydemersal depth range, which is a deep-water habitat. This species reaches the average length of about 19.6 centimetres (7.7 in).
