= Metavay sawbelly =

Scientific classification
- Kingdom: Animalia
- Phylum: Chordata
- Class: Actinopterygii
- Order: Trachichthyiformes
- Family: Trachichthyidae
- Genus: Hoplostethus
- Species: H. shubnikovi

Binomial name
- Hoplostethus shubnikovi Kotlyar, 1980

Species of fish

The Metavay sawbelly (Hoplostethus shubnikovi) is a slimehead of the order Beryciformes. It is native to the Indian Ocean along the northern section of the Mentawai ridge and western Australia. It can be found at depths between 800–875 m (2,625–2,871 ft) on the continental slope and can reach sizes of up to 20.3 cm (8.0 in) SL.
