= Little pineapple fish =

Conservation status
- Least Concern (IUCN 3.1)

Scientific classification
- Kingdom: Animalia
- Phylum: Chordata
- Class: Actinopterygii
- Order: Trachichthyiformes
- Family: Trachichthyidae
- Genus: Sorosichthys; Whitley, 1945
- Species: S. ananassa

Binomial name
- Sorosichthys ananassa Whitley, 1945

Species of fish

The little pineapple fish (Sorosichthys ananassa) is a small slimehead of the family Trachichthyidae, the only member of the genus Sorosichthys, found in the eastern Indian Ocean, on the continental shelf of the southwestern coasts of Western Australia and South Australia, at depths between 50 and 70 m (160 and 230 ft). Its length is up to about 8 cm (3.1 in).
