= Cryptoberyx =

Cryptoberyx Temporal range: Late Cenomanian

Scientific classification
- Domain: Eukaryota
- Kingdom: Animalia
- Phylum: Chordata
- Class: Actinopterygii
- Superorder: Acanthopterygii
- Genus: †Cryptoberyx; Gaudant, 1978

Species
- †C. brevis Gaudant, 1978; †C. minimus Gaudant, 1978

Extinct genus of fishes

Cryptoberyx is an extinct genus of prehistoric marine ray-finned fish that lived during the late Cenomanian stage of the Late Cretaceous. Two species are known from southern Europe and the Middle East, both part of the former Tethys Sea.

The following species are known:

- †C. minimus Gaudant, 1978 (type species) - Cenomanian of Lebanon (Sannine Formation)
- †C. brevis Gaudant, 1978 - Cenomanian of Portugal

The holotype of C. minimus was initially used by Arthur Smith Woodward as a paratype of Lissoberyx dayi, until later studies found it to represent a different genus entirely.

Cryptoberyx was previously considered a beryciform under a former paraphyletic view of the order (which also included the Trachichthyiformes and Holocentriformes), as a stem-group "trachichthyoid". With the splitting of these two orders, its taxonomic identity is unclear.

== See also ==
- Prehistoric fish
- List of prehistoric bony fish
