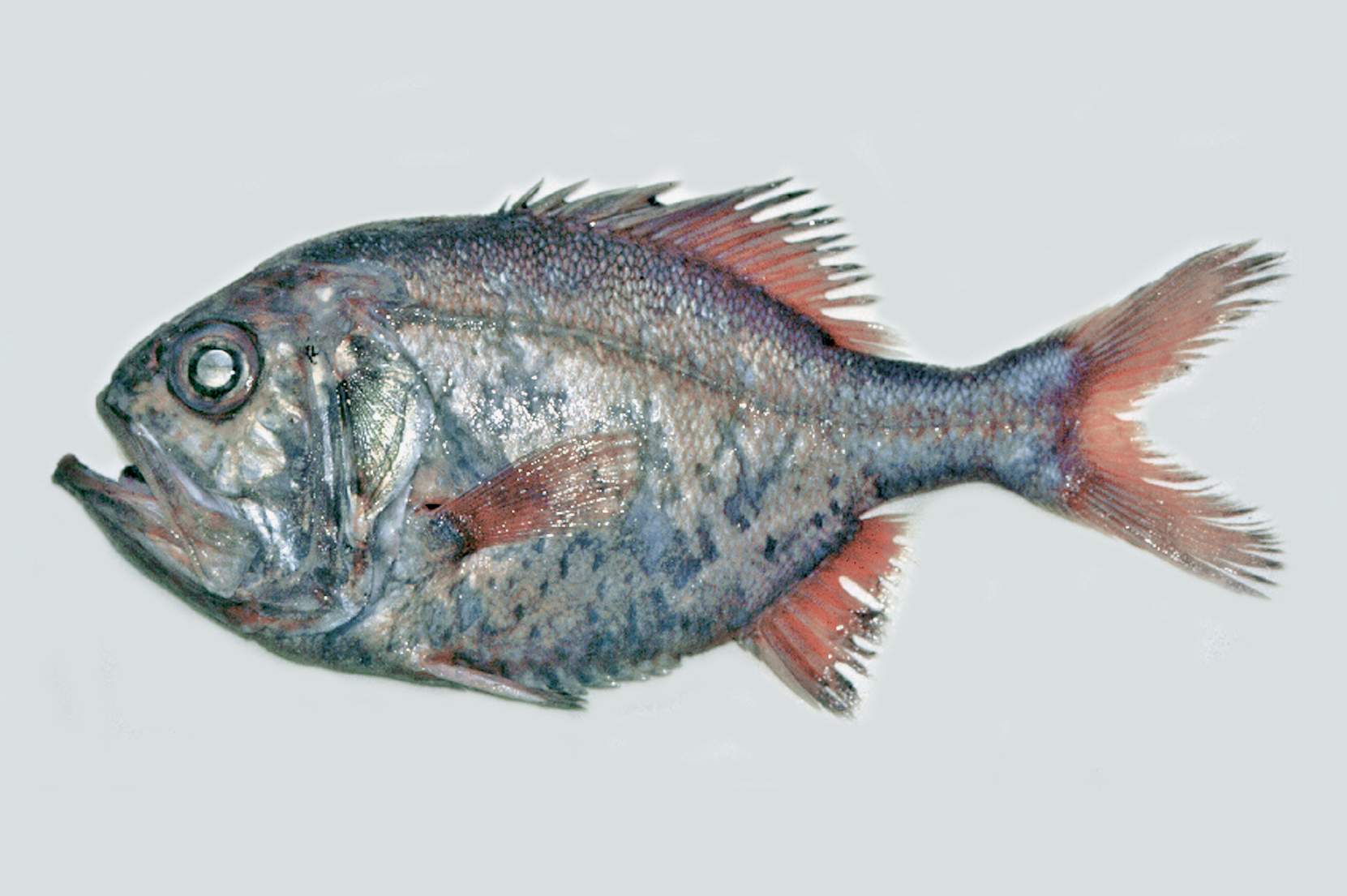

Conservation status
- Least Concern (IUCN 3.1)

Scientific classification
- Kingdom: Animalia
- Phylum: Chordata
- Class: Actinopterygii
- Order: Trachichthyiformes
- Family: Trachichthyidae
- Genus: Hoplostethus
- Species: H. gigas

Binomial name
- Hoplostethus gigas McCulloch, 1914

= Hoplostethus gigas =

Species of fish

Hoplostethus gigas, the giant sawbelly, is a medium-sized deep-sea fish species belonging to the slimehead family (Trachichthyidae). It is found along the western and southern coasts of Australia and near New Zealand. It lives on the continental slope between depths of 237 and 311 metres (780 and 1,020 ft). It can reach sizes of up to 52.5 centimetres (20.7 in) SL.
