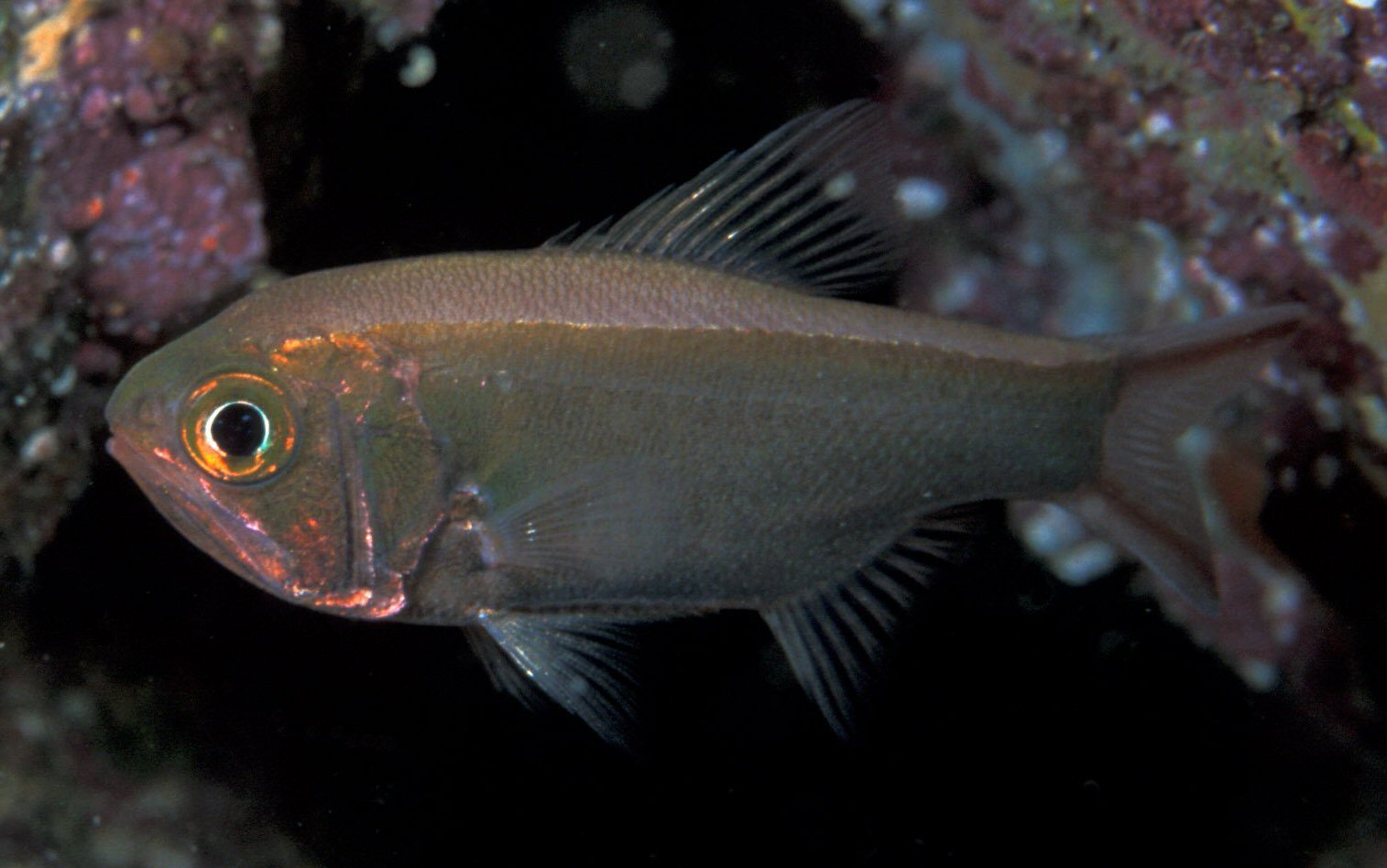
- Slender roughy (O. elongatus)

Scientific classification
- Domain: Eukaryota
- Kingdom: Animalia
- Phylum: Chordata
- Class: Actinopterygii
- Order: Trachichthyiformes
- Family: Trachichthyidae
- Genus: Optivus; Whitley, 1947

= Optivus =

Genus of fishes

Optivus is a fish genus from the family Trachichthyidae found from near the surface to depths of 320 m (1,050 ft) in the southwest Pacific Ocean off Australia (O. agastos and O. agrammus) and New Zealand (O. elongatus).

== Species ==
The currently recognized species in this genus are:

- Optivus agastos M. F. Gomon, 2004 (violet roughy)
- Optivus agrammus M. F. Gomon, 2004 (western roughy)
- Optivus elongatus (Günther, 1859) (slender roughy)
