= Parinoberyx =

Conservation status
- Data Deficient (IUCN 3.1)

Scientific classification
- Kingdom: Animalia
- Phylum: Chordata
- Class: Actinopterygii
- Division: Teleostei
- Order: Trachichthyiformes
- Family: Trachichthyidae
- Genus: Parinoberyx; Kotlyar, 1984
- Species: P. horridus

Binomial name
- Parinoberyx horridus Kotlyar, 1984

Genus of fishes

Parinoberyx is a genus of marine slimeheads only known from the Western Pacific and the Coral Sea at depths around 300 m (980 ft). This only known member of the genus is Parinoberyx horridus.
