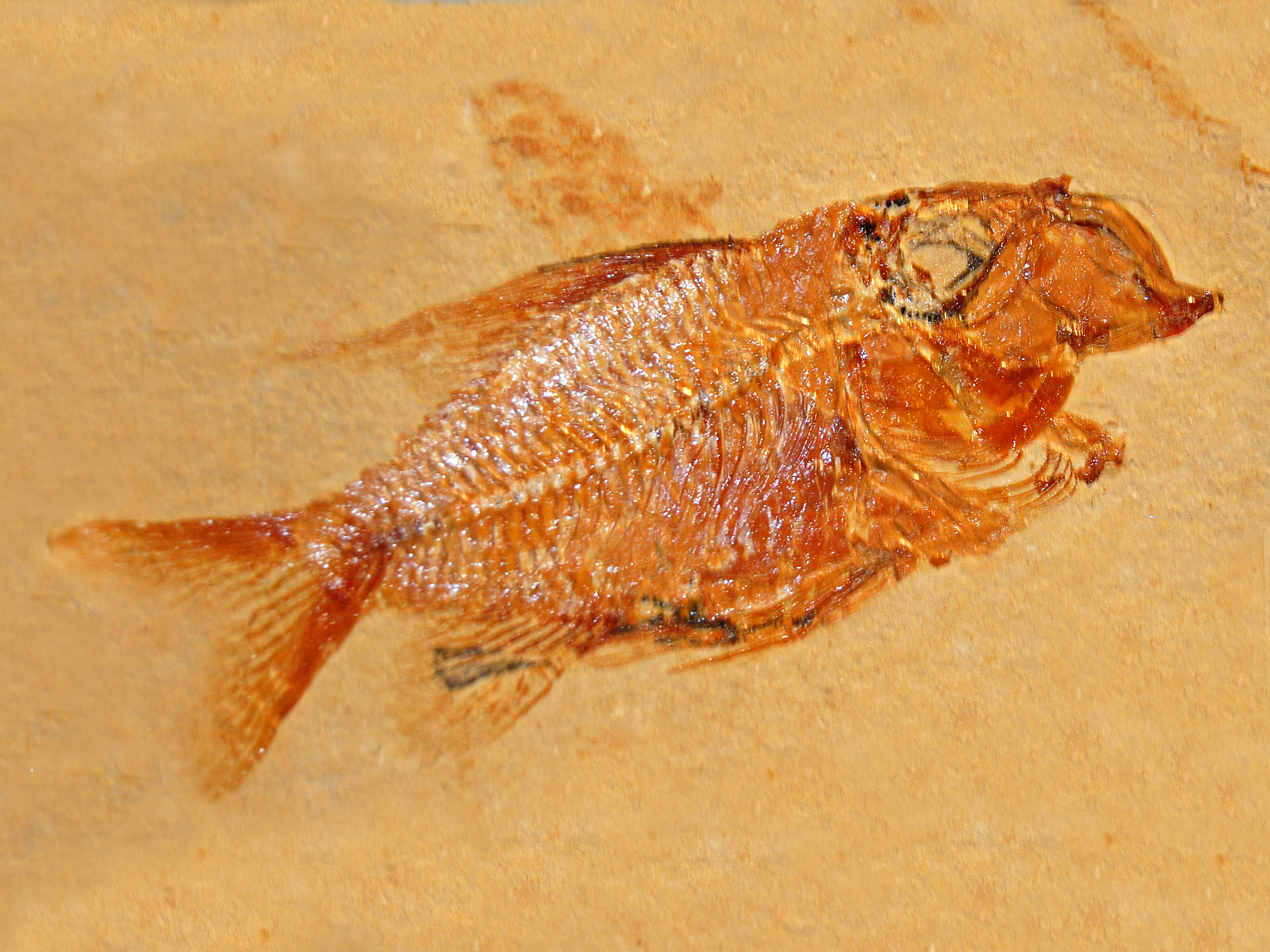
- Fossil of Lissoberyx species from Lebanon

Scientific classification
- Kingdom: Animalia
- Phylum: Chordata
- Class: Actinopterygii
- Division: Teleostei
- Order: Trachichthyiformes
- Genus: †Lissoberyx; Patterson, 1967

Type species
- †Acrogaster dayi Woodward, 1942

Species
- †L. arambourgi Gaudant, 1969; †L. dayi (Woodward, 1942); †L. denticulatus Gayet, 1980

= Lissoberyx =

Lissoberyx Temporal range: Cenomanian

Extinct genus of fishes

Lissoberyx is an extinct genus of prehistoric marine ray-finned fish from the Late Cretaceous, belonging to the order Trachichthyiformes. It was closely related to modern slimeheads.

== Taxonomy ==
The following species are known:

- †L. arambourgi Gaudant, 1969 - Cenomanian of Lebanon (Sannine Formation)
- †L. dayi (Woodward, 1942) (type species) - Cenomanian of Lebanon (Sannine Formation) (=Acrogaster dayi Woodward, 1942)
- †L. denticulatus Gayet, 1980 - Cenomanian of Lebanon (Sannine Formation)

Two other species, 'L.' anceps (Arambourg, 1954) from the Cenomanian of Morocco & 'L.' pugliensis Taverne, 2003 from the Campanian-Maastrichtian of Italy, show clear differences from the other species in this genus and likely do not belong in it. In addition, one of the specimens used by Patterson in his redescription of L. dayi was found to be distinct from other specimens of the same species, and was later redescribed as a new species (C. minimus) of a new genus, Cryptoberyx.

== Description ==
Lissoberyx can reach a body length of about 4 cm (1.6 in). These small deep-bodied fishes have 23 vertebrae, five spines in the dorsal fin, while anal fin has four spines, less than ten soft rays in each. Scales are thin, no ventral ridge scales. Despite its clear affinities with modern trachichthyids, it also shows certain similarities with squirrelfish (Holocentridae), to a closer extent than any other trachichthyid.

== See also ==
- Prehistoric fish
- List of prehistoric bony fish
