= Tubantia =

Tubantia may refer to:

- Tubantia (fish), a prehistoric genus of fishes
- Tubantia (newspaper), a Dutch newspaper
- K. Tubantia Borgerhout V.K., a Belgian football club
- SS Tubantia, an oceanliner
