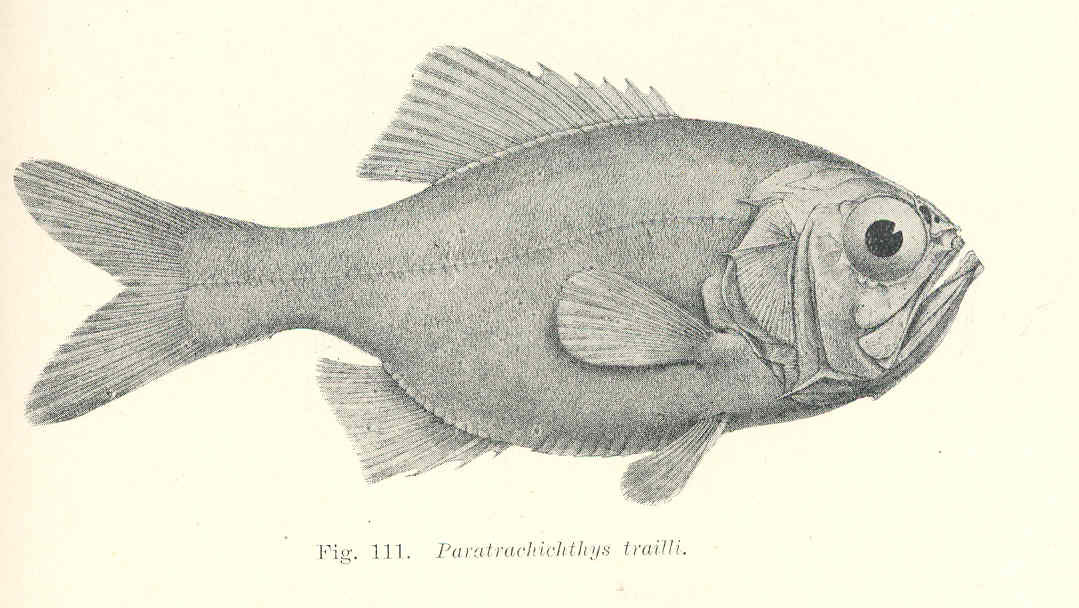
- Paratrachichthys trailli

Scientific classification
- Domain: Eukaryota
- Kingdom: Animalia
- Phylum: Chordata
- Class: Actinopterygii
- Order: Trachichthyiformes
- Family: Trachichthyidae
- Genus: Paratrachichthys; Waite, 1899

= Paratrachichthys =

Genus of fishes

Paratrachichthys is a genus of slimeheads found in the Pacific Ocean. It consists of three species, all known as sandpaper fish.

== Species ==
There are currently 3 recognized species in this genus:

- Paratrachichthys fernandezianus (Günther, 1887) (Chilean sandpaper fish)
- Paratrachichthys macleayi (Johnston, 1881) (Australian sandpaper fish)
- Paratrachichthys trailli (F. W. Hutton, 1875) (sandpaper fish)
