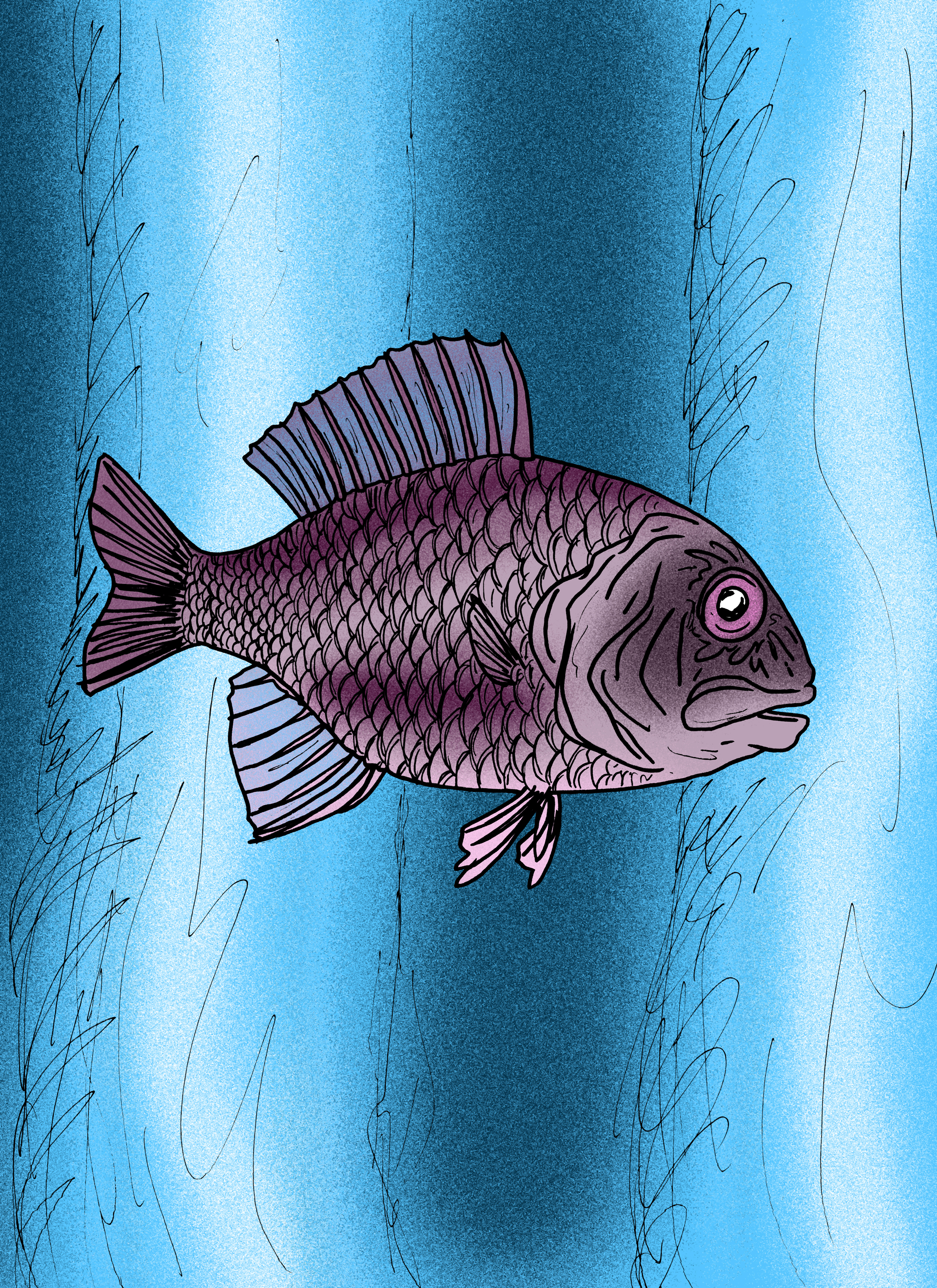
- Artist's restoration

Scientific classification
- Kingdom: Animalia
- Phylum: Chordata
- Class: Actinopterygii
- Order: Trachichthyiformes
- Family: Trachichthyidae
- Genus: †Pepemkay; Alvarado-Ortega & Than-Marchese, 2013
- Species: †P. maya

Binomial name
- †Pepemkay maya Alvarado-Ortega & Than-Marchese, 2013

= Pepemkay =

Pepemkay Temporal range: Late Cretaceous, Cenomanian

Extinct genus of fishes

Pepemkay is an extinct genus of lissoberycine trachichthyid fish in prehistoric North America.

The prehistoric ray-finned fish genus contains a single species, Pepemkay maya.

== Fossil record ==
Pepemkay maya is known from fossils in the Sierra Madre Formation, from the Cenomanian stage during the Late Cretaceous epoch.

The geologic formation is located in Chiapas state of southwestern Mexico.

== See also ==
- Cretaceous fish of North America
- Cretaceous Mexico
