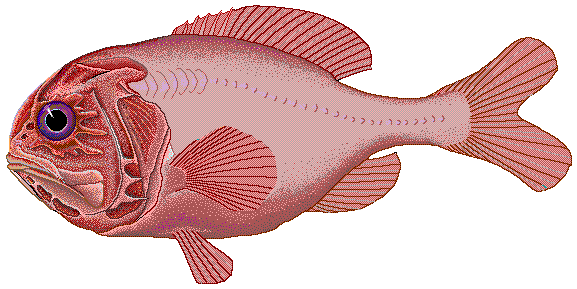

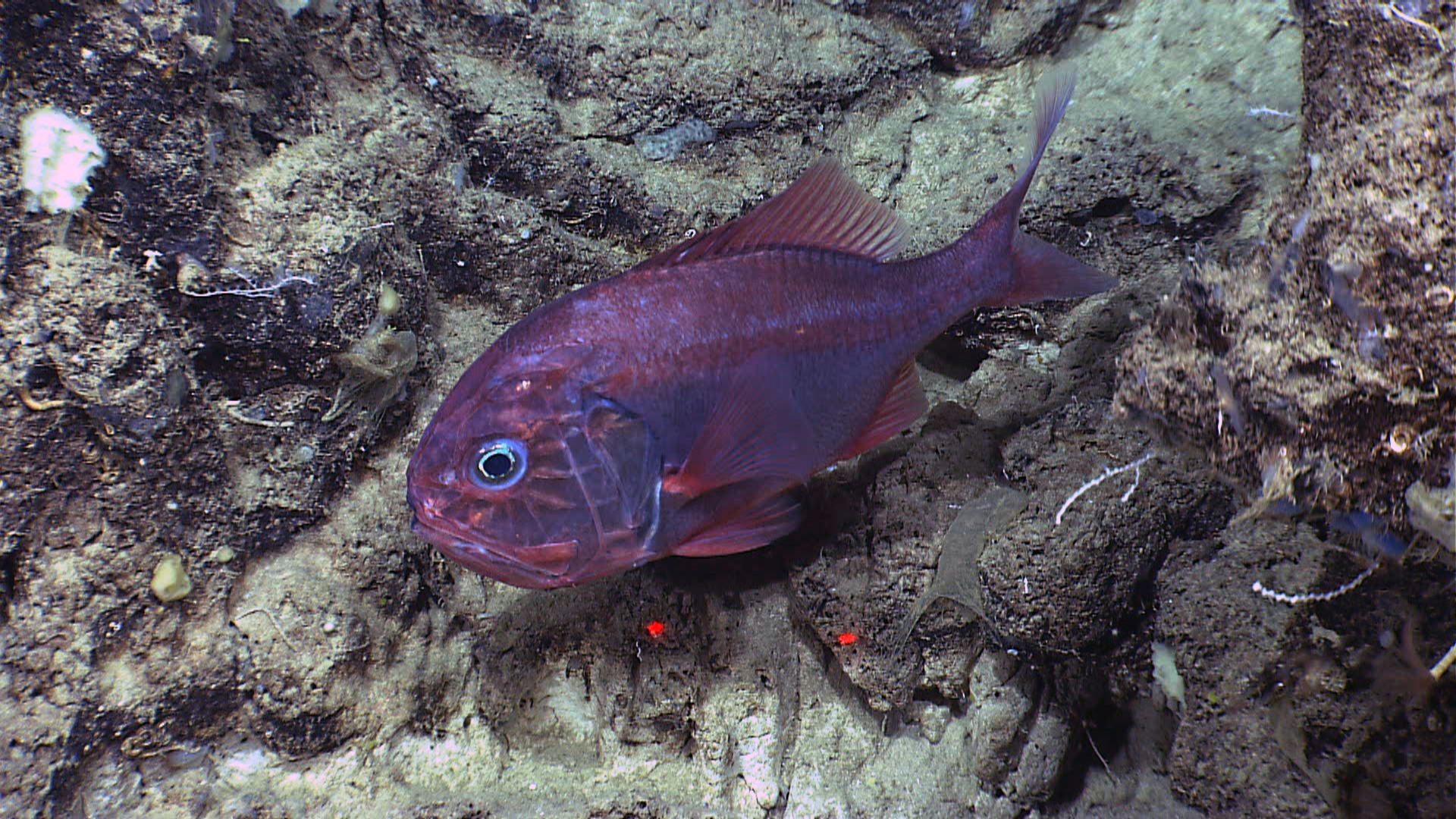

Conservation status
- Vulnerable (IUCN 3.1) (Europe)

Scientific classification
- Kingdom: Animalia
- Phylum: Chordata
- Class: Actinopterygii
- Division: Teleostei
- Order: Trachichthyiformes
- Family: Trachichthyidae
- Genus: Hoplostethus
- Species: H. atlanticus

Binomial name
- Hoplostethus atlanticus Collett, 1889

= Orange roughy =

Species of fish

The orange roughy (Hoplostethus atlanticus), also known as the red roughy, slimehead and deep sea perch, is a relatively large deep-sea fish belonging to the slimehead family (Trachichthyidae). It is bathypelagic, found in cold (3 to 9 °C or 37 to 48 °F), deep (180-to-1,800-metre or 590-to-5,910-foot) waters of the Western Pacific Ocean, eastern Atlantic Ocean (from Iceland to Morocco; and from Walvis Bay, Namibia, to off Durban, South Africa), Indo-Pacific (off New Zealand and Australia), and in the eastern Pacific off Chile. The orange roughy is notable for its extraordinary lifespan, attaining over 200 years. The fish has a bright, brick red color, fading to a yellowish-orange after death.

Like other slimeheads, orange roughy is slow-growing and late to mature, resulting in a very low stock resilience, making them extremely susceptible to overfishing. Despite this, the species is important to commercial deep-trawl fisheries; many stocks (especially those off New Zealand and Australia, which were first exploited in the late 1970s) became severely depleted within 3–20 years, but several have subsequently recovered to levels that fisheries management believe are sustainable, although substantially below unfished populations. The UK Marine Conservation Society has categorized orange roughy as "vulnerable to exploitation".

== Description ==
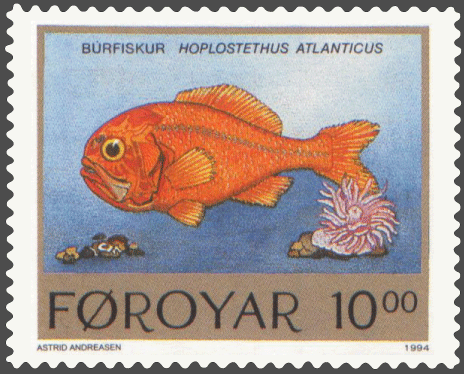
Fish in the Faroe Islands: Orange roughy, Hoplostethus atlanticus Faroese stamp issued: 7 Feb 1994 Artist: Astrid Andreasen

The orange roughy is laterally compressed, typical for its family. Its rounded head is riddled with muciferous canals (part of the lateral line system), also typical of slimeheads. The single dorsal fin contains four to six spines and 15 to 19 soft rays; the anal fin contains three spines and 10 to 12 soft rays. The 19 to 25 ventral scutes (modified scales) form a hard, bony median ridge between the pelvic fins and anus. The pectoral fins contain 15 to 18 soft rays each; the pelvic fins are thoracic and contain one spine and six soft rays; the caudal fin is forked. The interior of the mouth and gill cavity is a bluish black; the mouth itself is large and strongly oblique. The scales are ctenoid and adherent. The lateral line is uninterrupted, with 28 to 32 scales whose spinules or 'ctenii' largely obscure the lateral line's pores. The eyes are large.

The orange roughy is the largest known slimehead species at a maximum standard length (a measurement that excludes the tail fin) of 75 cm (30 in) and a maximum weight of 7 kg (15 lb). The average commercial catch size is commonly between 35 and 45 centimetres (14 and 18 in) in length, again, varying by area.

== Life history ==
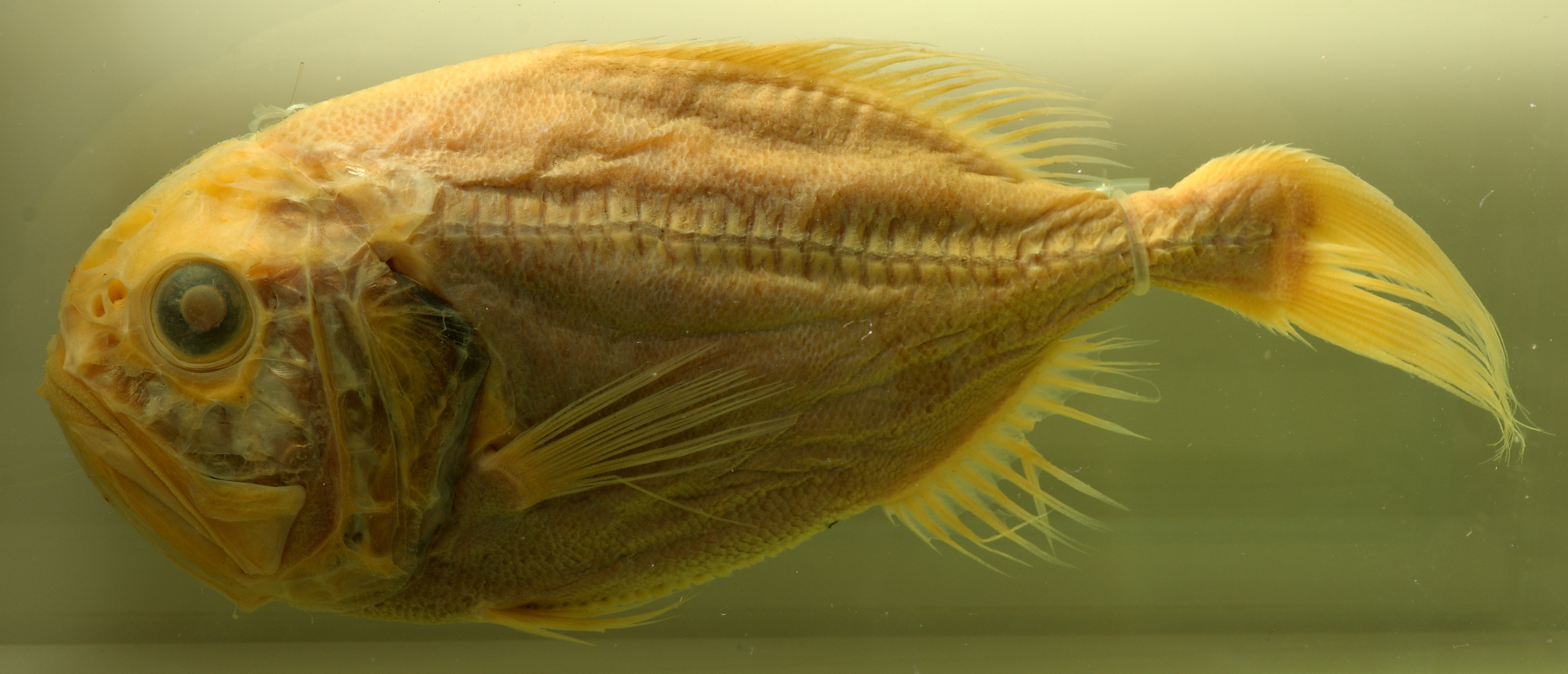
A preserved specimen on display at a museum

Orange roughy are generally sluggish and demersal; they form aggregations with a natural population density of up to 2.5 fish per m^{2}, now reduced to about 1.0 per m^{2}. These aggregations form in and around geologic structures, such as undersea canyons and seamounts, where water movement and mixing is high, ensuring dense prey concentrations. The aggregations are not necessarily for spawning or feeding; the fish are thought to cycle through metabolic phases (active or feeding and inactive or resting) and seek areas with ideal hydrologic conditions to congregate during each phase. They lose almost all pigmentation while inactive, when they are very approachable. Predators include large, deep-roving sharks, cutthroat eels, merluccid hakes, and snake mackerels such as oilfish.

When active, juveniles feed primarily on zooplankton, such as mysid shrimp, euphausiids (krill), mesopelagic and benthopelagic fish, amphipods, and other crustaceans; mature adults consume smaller fish, predominantly of the Butterflyfish and Lanternfish families, and squid, which make up to 20% of their diet. The diet of the orange roughy is depth-related, with adult diets inversely related to that of juveniles. For example, juvenile consumption of crustaceans is lowest at 900 metres (3,000 ft) but increases with depth, while crustaceans in the adult diet peak at 800–1,000 metres (2,600–3,300 ft) and decrease with depth. The consumption of fish is the opposite: juvenile consumption decreases with depth while adult consumption increases. This inverse feeding pattern may be an example of resource-partitioning to avoid intraspecific competition for the available food at depths where prey is less abundant. The orange roughy's metabolic phases are thought to be related to seasonal variations in prey concentrations. The inactive phase conserves energy during lean periods. Orange roughy can live for over 200 years.

=== Reproduction ===
Orange roughy are oceanodromous (wholly marine), pelagic spawners: that is, they migrate several hundred kilometers between localized spawning and feeding areas each year and form large spawning aggregations (possibly segregated according to gender) wherein the fish release large, spherical eggs 2.0–2.5 millimetres (0.079–0.098 in) in diameter, made buoyant by an orange-red oil globule) and sperm en masse directly into the water. The fertilized eggs, (and later larvae) are planktonic, rising to around 200 m (660 ft) to develop, with the young fish eventually descending to deeper waters as they mature. Orange roughy are also synchronous, shedding sperm and eggs at the same time. The time between fertilization and hatching is thought to be 10 to 20 days; fecundity is low, with each female producing only 22,000 eggs per kg of body weight, less than 10% of the average for other species of fish. Females rarely produce more than 90,000 eggs in a single spawning event. Spawning may last up to three weeks and starts around June or July.

Orange roughy are very slow-growing and do not begin to breed until they are at least 20 years old, when they are around 30 cm (12 in) in length. Some populations don't reach sexual maturity until even later in life; a May 2022 assessment of orange roughy populations off the east coast of New Zealand's North Island found that spawning didn't start until 40 years, and that only half of females were spawning by 55 years old. 95% of fish were spawning by 73.3 years old, and "all fish spawned by about age 80."

The maturation age used in stock assessments ranges from 23 to 40 years, which limits population growth/recovery, because each new generation takes so long to start spawning.

=== Lifespan ===
When commercial fishing of orange roughy began in the 1970s, they were thought to live for only 30 years. Since the 1990s, however, there is clear evidence that this species lives to an exceptional age. Early estimates of 149 years were determined via radiometric dating of trace isotopes found in an orange roughy's otolith (ear bone); counting by the growth rings of orange roughy otoliths gave estimated ages of 125 to 156 years. One specimen caught 1500 km east of Wellington in 2015 was estimated to be over 230 years old. Orange roughy caught near Tasmania have been aged at 250 years. The orange roughy is the longest-lived commercial fish species, and does not breed every year, which has important implications for its conservation status.

== Consumption ==
The flesh is firm with a mild flavour; it is sold skinned and filleted, fresh or frozen. This species was first given the common name "Orange Roughy" by scientists in New Zealand in 1975 following the discovery of large aggregations during a deep-water research cruise. A large-scale fishery for orange roughy subsequently developed around New Zealand, and imports into the United States increased where it was renamed from the less gastronomically appealing "slimehead" through a U.S. National Marine Fisheries Service program during the late 1970s that identified underused species that should be renamed to make them more marketable.

Historically, the United States has been the largest consumer of orange roughy; however, in recent years, the market for orange roughy in China has increased significantly. In 2014, the U.S. imported around 1,455 tonnes (4.4 million lb) (mainly fillets) from New Zealand, China, Peru and Indonesia. In 2015, China imported at least 4,000 tonnes (8.8 million lb) (mainly whole fish).

A number of major food retailers have established seafood sustainability policies to reassure customers that they are stocking sustainable seafood. These policies often involve partnering with non-governmental organizations to define criteria for seafood that may be stocked. In addition, a number of ecolabels exist to help retailers and consumers identify seafood that has been independently assessed against a robust, scientific standard. One of the best known such programmes is that of the Marine Stewardship Council.

In 2010, Greenpeace International added orange roughy (deep sea perch) to its seafood red list, which contains fish generally sourced from unsustainable fisheries.

A 2003 joint report by the TRAFFIC Oceania and World Wildlife Foundation Endangered Seas Program argues that "probably no such thing [exists] as an economically viable deep-water fishery that is also sustainable." However, others have argued that deepwater fisheries can be managed sustainably provided that it is recognized that sustainable yields are low and catches are set accordingly.

Because of its longevity, the orange roughy accumulates large amounts of mercury in its tissues, having a range of 0.30–0.86 ppm compared with an average mercury level of 0.086 ppm for other edible fish. Based on average consumption and the recommendations of a National Marine Fisheries Service study, in 1976 the FDA set the maximum safe mercury level for fish at 1 ppm. Regular consumption of orange roughy can have adverse effects on health. Compared to most edible fish, orange roughy is a very poor source of omega-3 fatty acids, averaging less than 3.5 g/kg.

== Fisheries ==
Capture production of Orange roughy (Hoplostethus atlanticus) in thousand tonnes from 1975 to 2022, as reported by the FAO New Zealand Australia Namibia Other countries

Orange roughy fisheries exist primarily in New Zealand, Australia and Namibia. Annual global catches began in 1979 and increased significantly to a high of over 90,000 tonnes in 1990. These high catch levels quickly decreased as stocks were fished down. For many stocks, the lack of understanding of the biological characteristics meant that they were overfished. By the end of the 1990s, three of the eight New Zealand orange roughy fisheries had collapsed and were closed. Because of its longevity, late maturation and relatively low fecundity, orange roughy stocks tend to recover more slowly than most other species.

A number of orange roughy stocks live outside the jurisdiction of any particular nation, making it more challenging to limit overall catches. The South Pacific Regional Fisheries Management Organisation (SPRFMO) and the South Indian Ocean Fisheries Agreement have orange roughy stocks that are managed within their jurisdictions. These organizations have made progress toward collecting better information on total orange roughy catches and also with setting catch limits for fisheries on the high seas. For example, SPRFMO limited orange roughy catches and effort from 2007.

Orange roughy is fished almost exclusively by bottom trawling. This fishing method has been heavily criticized by environmentalists for its destructive nature. This, combined with heavy commercial demand, has focused criticism from both environmentalists and media.

=== New Zealand fisheries ===
New Zealand currently operates the largest orange roughy fisheries in the world, with a total catch of over 8,500 tonnes in the 2014 calendar year. This accounts for 95% of the total estimated catch of orange roughy. Exports of orange roughy provided an estimated revenue to New Zealand of NZ$53 million (US$37M) in 2015.

Fisheries in New Zealand are managed through the Quota Management System (QMS), under which individuals or companies own quota shares for a stock of a particular species or species group. For each stock, a Total Allowable Catch (TAC) is set that maintains the stock at or above a level that can produce the maximum sustainable yield or that will move the stock toward that level. Orange roughy has been managed within the QMS since 1986.

The Ministry for Primary Industries is responsible for the implementation of the QMS and its enabling legislation, the Fisheries Act 1996.

==== Historical ====
Fishery farming of orange roughy was initiated in the mid-1970s, but full exploitation did not begin until 1979. There was no regulation of these early catches, and records indicate that they were very high. For many fisheries, management settings allow for a "fishing down" period during which the biomass is reduced to a level that will provide the maximum sustainable yield. For example, a fishery with a hypothetical unfished biomass of 100,000 tonnes will be allowed to be fished down to a biomass of 40,000 tonnes (assuming that this is the biomass that provides for the maximum sustainable yield) over a number of years. The rate of this "fish-down" can vary depending on the objectives of the fishery, but catches would then be more strictly controlled to maintain the biomass at around 40,000 tonnes.

For the New Zealand orange roughy fisheries, productivity parameters and resulting estimates of unfished biomass were incorrectly estimated in the first decade of the fishery. Catch limits exceeded recommended estimates of sustainable yields for a subsequent decade and catches were estimated to have exceeded those catch limits because of burst nets, escape windows in nets and lost gear. Catch limits were reduced in the mid-1990s, although they were increased again following indications that stocks had begun to rebuild. This was later found not to be the case and a number of fisheries were closed completely or had catch limits reduced to one tonne to allow the stocks to rebuild.

In one New Zealand fishery, the Total Allowable Catch (TAC) was reduced in 2008 from 1,470 tonnes to 914 tonnes, but this reduction was challenged in court. In February 2008, the High Court overturned the new quota, ruling that the Minister of Fisheries did not have the legal power to set quotas for ORH1. This was because of a strict interpretation of the Fisheries Act that required an accurate estimation of the biomass that could support the maximum sustainable yield. As a result of this decision, the Fisheries Act 1996 was amended to allow TACs to be set based on the best available information in the absence of an estimate of the biomass that could support the maximum sustainable yield.

==== Situation in 2016 ====
The New Zealand fishing industry contracted a pre-assessment of selected orange roughy fisheries against the Marine Stewardship Council (MSC) Fisheries Standard in 2009. Following the pre-assessment, the industry representative body (Deepwater Group Ltd) put four orange roughy fisheries into Fishery Improvement Plans (FIPs) to deliver improvements in the fisheries that would enable them to meet the certification requirements of the MSC. These FIPs are public and have been monitored by the Sustainable Fisheries Partnership.

In 2014, Bayesian model-based stock assessments were completed for four of New Zealand's main orange roughy stocks, one of which had been closed to fishing since 2000. The stock assessments used data collected by research surveys carried out by research organizations and the fishing industry. A key factor was the use of new acoustic technology, developed by the fishing industry, in recent surveys. The multi-frequency acoustic optical system (AOS) enables scientists to differentiate the types of fish acoustically 'seen' during the survey and works on slopes that previously made effective surveying impossible in some areas. The AOS also has the potential to allow scientists to see in real-time video, what is being measured by the survey. Other research-derived data were also critical to the success of the stock assessments, notably age-frequencies from improved ageing methods.

The 2014 stock assessments, which were subject to a robust peer review process, indicated that three of the stocks had recovered enough to sustain increased catches. The TACs for these stocks were subsequently increased. The fourth stock was estimated to be at a low stock status and the TAC was reduced by over 40% to allow the stock to rebuild.

In addition, an industry sponsored Management Strategy Evaluation was completed that provided an estimate of the biomass that could support the maximum sustainable yield (≈25–27% of the unfished biomass). Based on this output, the fishing industry agreed to aim to maintain the orange roughy stocks within a management target range of 30–50% of the unfished biomass. Further to this, a Harvest Control Rule was agreed that would define what catch limits should be given an estimate of stock status. Catch limits for those fisheries are currently consistent with the outputs of the agreed Harvest Control Rule. In May 2014, three orange roughy fisheries entered full assessment against the Marine Stewardship Council Fisheries Standard.

=== Australian fisheries ===
The Australian orange roughy fishery was not discovered until the 1970s, but by 2008, the biomass of some stocks remained high while others was estimated to be down to 10% of the unfished level after years of commercial fishing. It was the first commercially sought fish to appear on Australia's threatened species list because of overfishing. By late 2017, a number of Australian orange roughy fisheries had been re-opened.

In July 2020, a leading US-based MSC consultancy (conformity assessment body or CAB) acting for a group of Australian eastern zone orange roughy quota holders, released a scoring report recommended that the orange roughy eastern zone stock be given Marine Stewardship Council accreditation, scoring the fishery and its management highly (289/300) in each of the three assessment principles. However, environmental groups the Australian Marine Conservation Society and World Wildlife Fund raised late objections. MSC's decision to allow objections from these two eNGOs who did not engage in the more than year long process in contravention of the MSC Standard is seen by many as raising questions about the independence and credibility of the standard itself.

The Arbitrator issued her decision in three iterations in early 2021 each following representations from the Appellants, CAB and Fishery Client. During the process the Australian Minister for fisheries wrote to the MSC explaining that although orange roughy was listed under Australia's EPBC Act (1999) that it was also managed under the Fisheries Management Act (1991) and Fisheries Administration Act (1991) and that the commercial take of orange roughy allowed continued recovery and that it is listed in a section of the EPBC Act that allowed this commercial take. However, the Arbitrator found that her view was that the standard could not have intended threatened species to be certified and that the goal for threatened species should be zero catch. Further, that because orange roughy was listed under the EPBC Act that it should be considered as an endangered, threatened and protected (ETP) species as part of MSC Principle 2 and could therefore not also be considered as a target or subject stock under Principle 1.

In her second decision (February 2021) the Arbitrator summarised her decision by stating, "This particular stock is, according to the CAB and I have no reason within my limited remit, to disagree with this view, well managed and currently sustainably fished in terms of the prevailing science. I do acknowledge therefore that the remand decision will be all the more unwelcome by the CAB and the fishery client. However, the difficulty, in my view, lies in the narrow terms of the Standard when read against the Australian ETP legislation. It is not open to me to go beyond my interpretation, in light of any views I might have on the otherwise sustainability of the stock and the suitability of the unit of assessment for certification. The remedy to this lies outside of this process in seeking a change either to the Australian legislation or clarity in the Standard."

The Fishery Client subsequently withdrew the stock from assessment. The precedent set by this decision has raised questions about the future of MSC in Australia given that a number of fish species involved in existing MSC certificates are listed under the EPBC Act. The current apparent incompatibility of the MSC Standard and Australian legislation is one reason why the MSC system has been so slow to develop in Australia and that Australian consumers have little recognition of the MSC brand.

== See also ==
- List of fish common names
