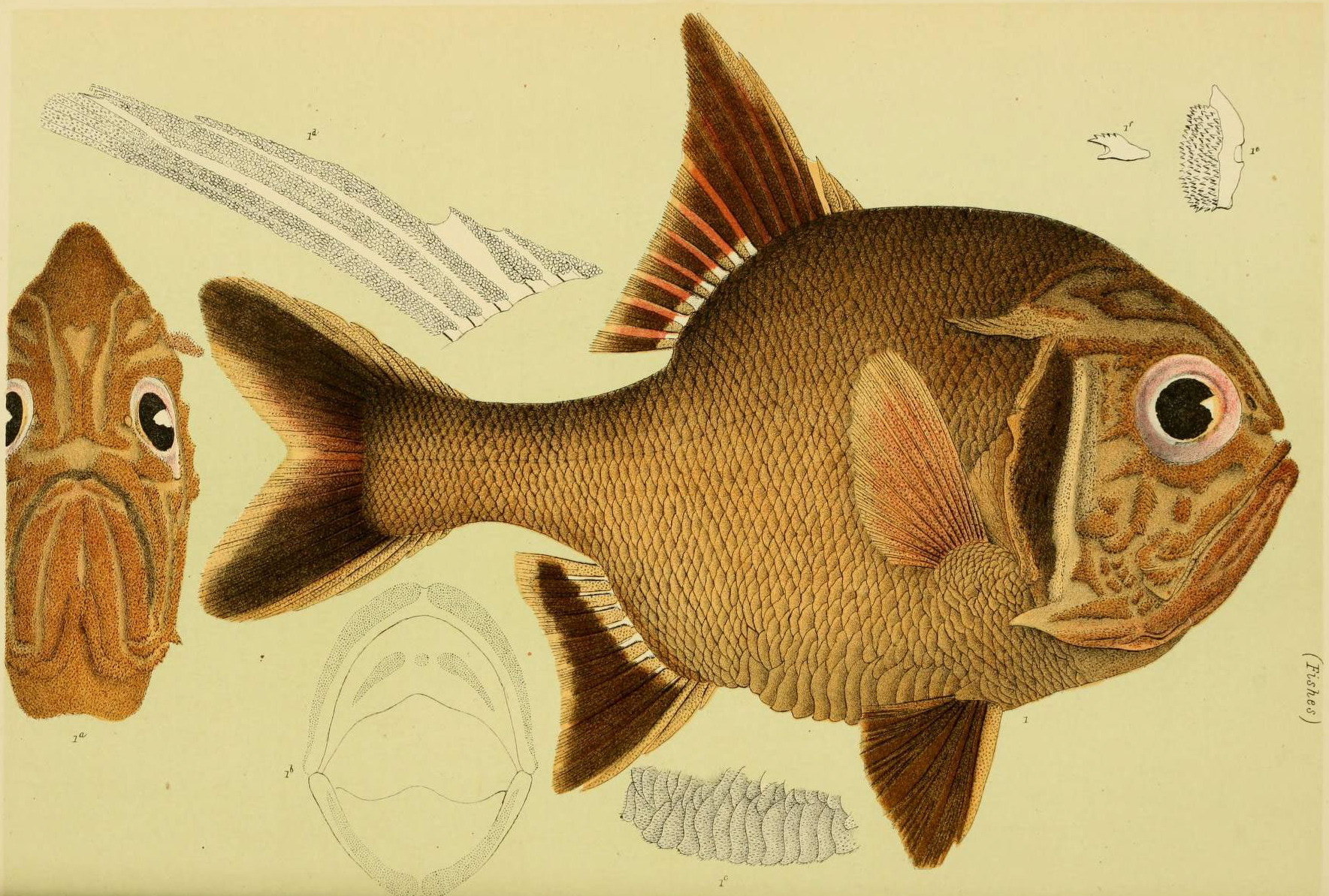

Scientific classification
- Kingdom: Animalia
- Phylum: Chordata
- Class: Actinopterygii
- Order: Trachichthyiformes
- Family: Trachichthyidae
- Genus: Trachichthys; G. Shaw, 1799
- Species: T. australis

Binomial name
- Trachichthys australis G. Shaw, 1799

Synonyms
- Amphiprion carinatus Schneider, 1801; Trachichthys jacksoniensis MacLeay, 1881

= Trachichthys =

Genus of ray-finned fish

Trachichthys australis, the southern roughy, is a species of roughy and the only member of the genus Trachichthys, from Ancient Greek τραχύς (trakhús), meaning "rough", and ἰχθύς (ikhthús), meaning "fish". It is native to the waters off Australia, where it is found around coral reefs between 1 and 1,557 metres (3.3 and 5,108.3 ft) in depth. It can grow to a maximum length of 15.0 centimetres (5.9 in) SL.
