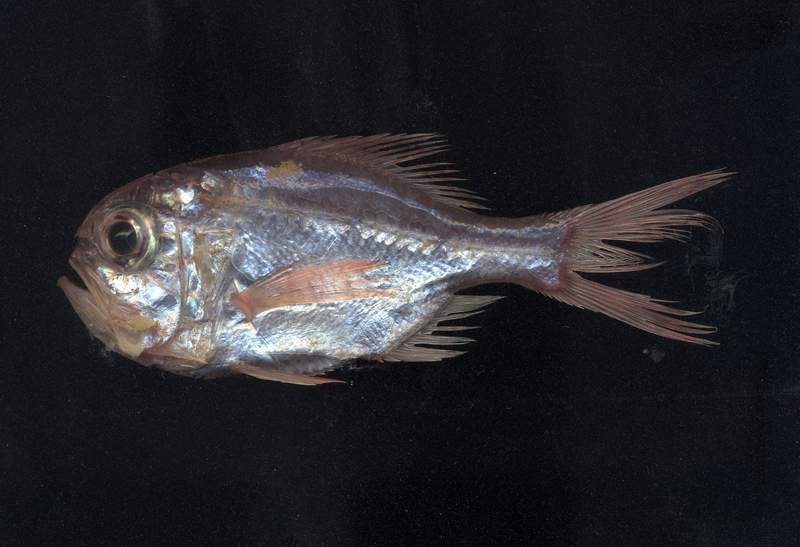
- Mediterranean slimehead (H. mediterraneus)

Scientific classification
- Kingdom: Animalia
- Phylum: Chordata
- Class: Actinopterygii
- Order: Trachichthyiformes
- Family: Trachichthyidae
- Genus: Hoplostethus; G. Cuvier, 1829

Species
- 30, see text

= Hoplostethus =

Genus of fishes

Hoplostethus is a genus of fish in the slimehead family.

== Species ==
There are 30 species in this genus:

- Hoplostethus abramovi Kotlyar, 1986
- Hoplostethus atlanticus (Collett, 1889) - orange roughy
- Hoplostethus cadenati Quéro, 1974 - black slimehead
- Hoplostethus confinis Kotlyar, 1980
- Hoplostethus crassispinus Kotlyar, 1980
- Hoplostethus druzhinini Kotlyar, 1986
- Hoplostethus fedorovi (Kotlyar, 1986)
- Hoplostethus fragilis (F. de Buen, 1959) - Chilean roughy
- Hoplostethus gigas (McCulloch, 1914) - giant sawbelly
- Hoplostethus grandperrini C. D. Roberts & M. F. Gomon, 2012 - Grandperrin's giant sawbelly
- Hoplostethus intermedius (Hector, 1875) - blacktip sawbelly
- Hoplostethus japonicus (Hilgendorf, 1879) - Western Pacific roughy
- Hoplostethus latus (McCulloch, 1914) - palefin sawbelly
- Hoplostethus marisrubri Kotlyar, 1986 - Red Sea roughy
- Hoplostethus mediterraneus (Cuvier, 1829) - Mediterranean slimehead, silver roughy
- Hoplostethus melanopeza C. D. Roberts & M. F. Gomon, 2012 - New Zealand giant sawbelly
- Hoplostethus melanopterus Fowler, 1938 - blackfin roughy
- Hoplostethus melanopus (M. C. W. Weber, 1913) - smallscale slimehead
- Hoplostethus mento (Garman, 1899) - slimy head
- Hoplostethus metallicus (Fowler, 1938) - metallic roughy
- Hoplostethus mikhailini (Kotlyar, 1986)
- Hoplostethus occidentalis (Woods, 1973) - western roughy
- Hoplostethus pacificus (Garman, 1899) - Eastern Pacific roughy
- Hoplostethus ravurictus (M. F. Gomon, 2008)
- Hoplostethus rifti (Kotlyar, 1986)
- Hoplostethus robustispinus (J. A. Moore & Dodd, 2010) - thickspine roughy
- Hoplostethus rubellopterus (Kotlyar, 1980)
- Hoplostethus shubnikovi (Kotlyar, 1980) - Metavay sawbelly
- Hoplostethus tenebricus (Kotlyar, 1980)
- Hoplostethus vniro (Kotlyar, 1995)
