= Acrogaster =

Acrogaster Temporal range: Late Santonian to Campanian

Scientific classification
- Domain: Eukaryota
- Kingdom: Animalia
- Phylum: Chordata
- Class: Actinopterygii
- Order: Trachichthyiformes
- Suborder: Trachichthyoidei
- Genus: †Acrogaster; Agassiz, 1839

Type species
- †Acrogaster parvus Agassiz, 1839

Species
- See text

Extinct genus of fishes

Acrogaster is a genus of fossil marine fish in the order Trachichthyiformes, known from the Late Cretaceous period. Species are known from Germany and Lebanon.

== Species ==
The following species are known:

- †A. brevicostatus von der Marck, 1863 - Late Campanian of Germany
- †A. daviesi Davis, 1887 - Late Santonian of Lebanon
- †A. heckeli Pictet, 1850 - Late Santonian of Lebanon
- †A. minutus von der Marck, 1863 - Late Campanian of Germany
- †A. parvus Agassiz, 1839 - Late Campanian of Germany

The former species A. anceps and A. dayi are now placed in Lissoberyx.
