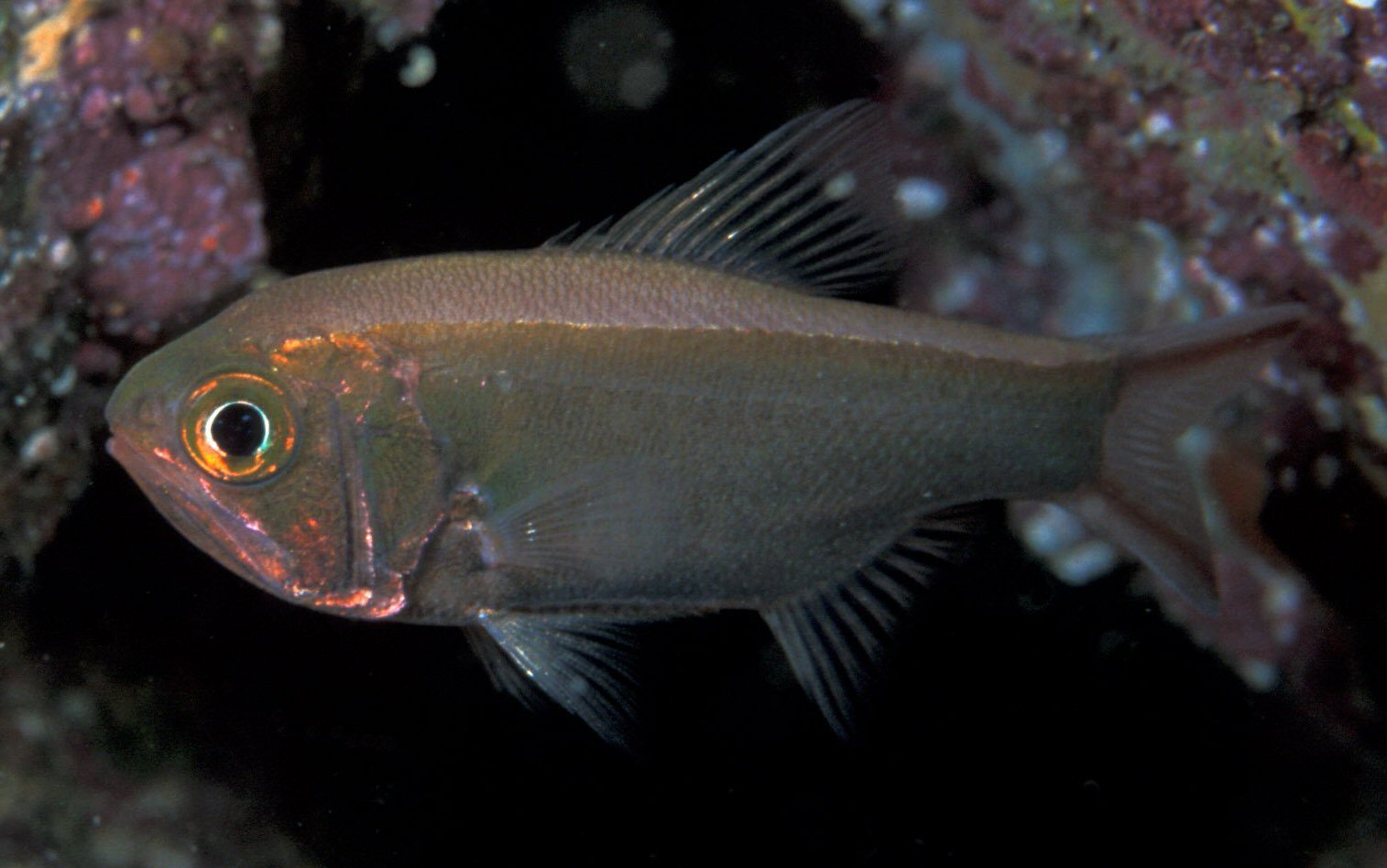

Conservation status
- Least Concern (IUCN 3.1)

Scientific classification
- Kingdom: Animalia
- Phylum: Chordata
- Class: Actinopterygii
- Order: Trachichthyiformes
- Family: Trachichthyidae
- Genus: Optivus
- Species: O. elongatus

Binomial name
- Optivus elongatus (Günther, 1859)

= Slender roughy =

Species of fish

The slender roughy (Optivus elongatus) is a fish of the family Trachichthyidae. Until 2004 when two new species were described, the slender roughy was believed to be the only species in the genus Optivus. The slender roughy is found in the southwestern Pacific Ocean around New Zealand at depths between 10 and 100 m (33 and 328 ft). Its length is up to 102 mm (4.0 in) standard length or 120 mm (4.7 in) overall total length.
