= Lobopterus =

Lobopterus Temporal range: Cenomanian

Scientific classification
- Domain: Eukaryota
- Kingdom: Animalia
- Phylum: Chordata
- Class: Actinopterygii
- Order: Beryciformes
- Genus: †Lobopterus; Gorjanović-Kramberger, 1895

Extinct genus of fishes

Lobopterus is an extinct genus of prehistoric ray-finned fish that lived during the Cenomanian.

== See also ==
- Prehistoric fish
- List of prehistoric bony fish
