= Proserranus =

Scientific classification
- Domain: Eukaryota
- Kingdom: Animalia
- Phylum: Chordata
- Class: Actinopterygii
- Order: Perciformes
- Genus: †Proserranus; Patterson, 1964

Extinct genus of fishes

Proserranus is an extinct genus of prehistoric bony fish that lived during the Danian stage of the Paleocene epoch.

== See also ==
- Prehistoric fish
- List of prehistoric bony fish
