= Stichopteryx =

Stichopteryx Temporal range: Cenomanian

Scientific classification
- Domain: Eukaryota
- Kingdom: Animalia
- Phylum: Chordata
- Class: Actinopterygii
- Order: Beryciformes
- Genus: †Stichopteryx; Gaudant, 1969

Extinct genus of fishes

Stichopteryx is an extinct genus of prehistoric ray-finned fish that lived during the Cenomanian.

== See also ==
- Prehistoric fish
- List of prehistoric bony fish
