= Tubantia (fish) =

Tubantia Temporal range: Upper Campanian

Scientific classification
- Domain: Eukaryota
- Kingdom: Animalia
- Phylum: Chordata
- Class: Actinopterygii
- Order: Beryciformes
- Genus: †Tubantia; Patterson, 1964

Extinct genus of fishes

Tubantia is an extinct genus of prehistoric bony fish that lived during the upper Campanian.

== See also ==
- Prehistoric fish
- List of prehistoric bony fish
