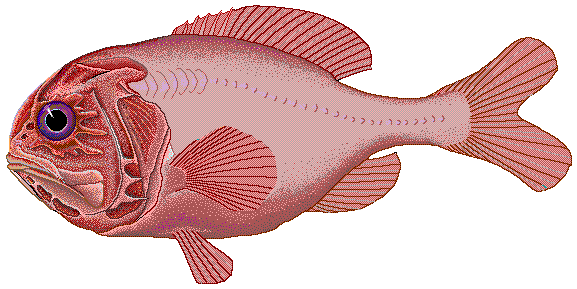
- Orange roughy, Hoplostethus atlanticus

Scientific classification
- Kingdom: Animalia
- Phylum: Chordata
- Class: Actinopterygii
- Order: Trachichthyiformes
- Suborder: Trachichthyoidei
- Family: Trachichthyidae; Bleeker, 1859

Genera
- Aulotrachichthys; Gephyroberyx; Hoplostethus; †Hoplopteryx; Optivus; Paratrachichthys; Parinoberyx; Sorosichthys; Trachichthys

= Slimehead =

Family of fishes

Slimeheads, also known as roughies and redfish, are mostly small, exceptionally long-lived, deep-sea beryciform fish constituting the family Trachichthyidae, coming from the Ancient Greek τραχύς (trakhús), meaning "rough", and ἰχθύς (ikhthús), meaning "fish". Found in temperate to tropical waters of the Atlantic, Indian, and Pacific Oceans, the family comprises about 50 species in eight genera. Slimeheads are named for the network of muciferous canals riddling their heads.

The larger species – namely the orange roughy (Hoplostethus atlanticus) and Darwin's slimehead (Gephyroberyx darwinii) – are the target of extensive commercial fisheries off Australia and New Zealand. Many populations have already crashed, while others are showing signs of severe overfishing; due to slimeheads' slow rate of reproduction, the future viability of these fisheries has been put into question. Orange roughies are food fish and are marketed fresh and frozen, whereas Darwin's slimeheads are used for their oil and made into fishmeal.

== Description ==
With a typically deep-bodied, laterally compressed form, slimeheads are conspicuous for their large, titular heads, large eyes, and (in some species) bright colours. The head is especially notable for its network of mucus-filled canals, which constitute the cranial portion of the lateral line system. Similar cranial networks are found in the beryciform fangtooths (Anoplogastridae) and the stephanoberyciform ridgeheads (Melamphaidae). The trachichthyid head is typically blunt with a large and oblique mouth; the snout may project slightly in front of the upper jaw. A short, sharp spine is present on the preoperculum and/or operculum and post-temporal bone, the latter spine directed posteriorly. Species of the genera Optivus, Paratrachichthys, and Sorosichthys differ in form from other members of the family; their bodies are more elongated.

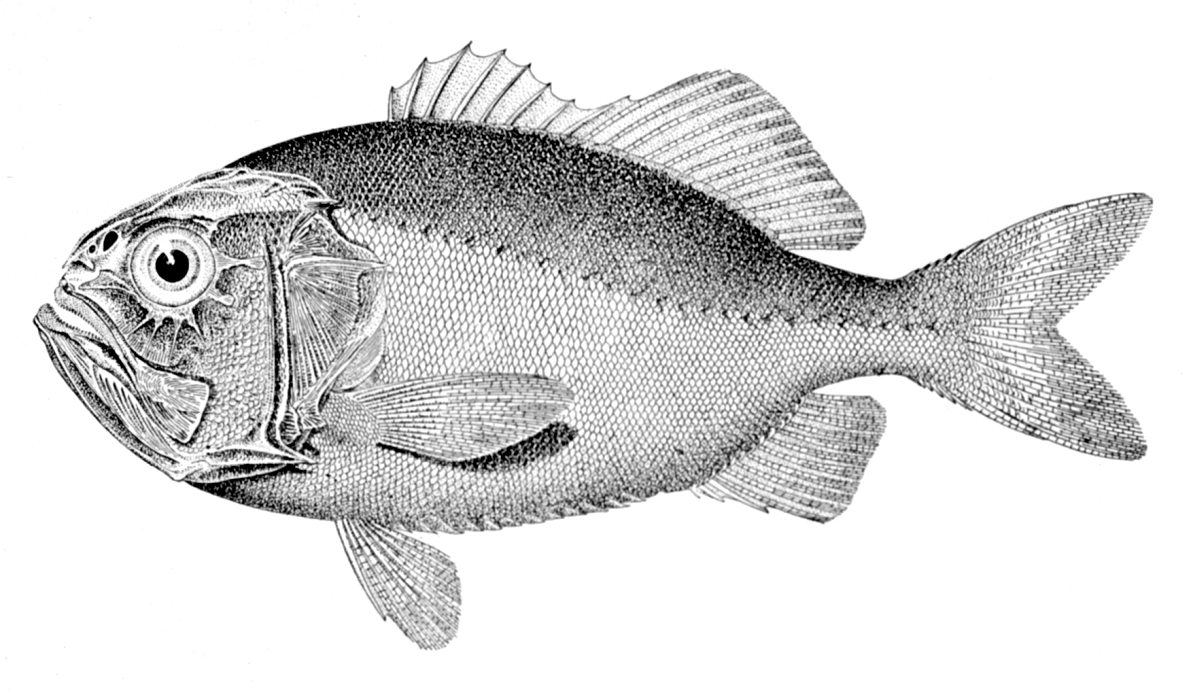
Darwin's slimehead (Gephyroberyx darwinii) is another large (60 cm standard length), commercially important species. Its morphology is typical of the family.

All fins are spinous (excluding the low-slung pectoral fins) and rounded: the single dorsal fin has three to eight spines and 10–19 soft rays; the pelvic fins are thoracic with one spine and six or seven soft rays; the anal fin has two or three spines and eight to 12 soft rays; and even the forked caudal fin possesses four to seven procurrent spines on each lobe. The scales of slimeheads are ctenoid, but vary interspecifically; they range from deciduous to adherent. In most species, the ventral scales between the pelvic fin and anus have been modified into a median ridge of large, bony scutes. The lateral line is uninterrupted and fairly obvious; its pores are largely obscured by the scales' well-developed spinules or ctenii.

Slimeheads range from a bright brick red with identically shaded fins, to dusky grey or silver, to black with dusky grey to transparent fins. The reds quickly fade to orange following death. Some species (e.g., Aulotrachichthys latus) are reported to be bioluminescent, probably by symbiotic bacteria as is found in other beryciform fish. The largest species is the orange roughy at a maximum standard length (SL; a measurement excluding the caudal fin) of 75 cm and a weight of 7 kg; however, most slimeheads are well under 30 cm SL.

== Life history ==
Most slimeheads are sluggish and demersal, spending most of their time near the bottom of continental slopes. Cold, moderate benthopelagic depths (about 100 – 1,500 m) with usually hard, rocky substrates are frequented. The most elongate species are typically the most active and frequent the shallowest depths; for example, the slender roughy (Optivus elongatus) is found in photic coastal waters and is associated with rocky reefs. This species is nocturnal and hides in crevices during the day. Trachichthys australis is of the same habitus, but is rather deep-bodied and resembles a soldierfish. Both young and adult slimeheads feed primarily upon zooplankton such as mysid shrimp, amphipods, euphausiids, prawns, and other crustaceans, as well as larval fish. Slimeheads store energy as extracellular wax esters, which aid the fish in maintaining neutral buoyancy.

Slimehead behaviour is not well studied, but some species sporadically form dense aggregations. In the case of the orange roughy, these aggregations (possibly segregated according to sex) may reach a population density of 2.5/m^{2};. The aggregations form in and around geologic structures, such as undersea canyons and seamounts, likely where water movement and mixing is high, ensuring dense concentrations of prey items. The aggregations do not necessarily form for the purpose of spawning; it is thought that the fish cycle through metabolic phases (feeding and resting) and seek areas with ideal hydrologic conditions to congregate during their inactive and active phases. Observations of orange roughy aggregations during submersible dives have also shown the fish lose almost all pigmentation while inactive, during which time they are very approachable. The orange roughy's metabolic phases are thought to be related to seasonal variations in the fish's prey concentrations, with the inactive phase being a means to conserve energy during lean periods.

Slimeheads are pelagic spawners; that is, spawning aggregations are formed and the fish release eggs and sperm en masse directly into the water. Evidence of oceanodromy (seasonal migration) is seen in some species. The fertilized eggs (and later the larvae) are planktonic, floating with the currents until the larvae develop the strength to determine their own way. Only the economically important species have had their reproduction studied in any detail; the larvae and juveniles of Darwin's slimehead are pelagic and frequent rather shallow waters near the coast, whereas in orange roughy, the early life stages are apparently confined to deeper water (around 200 m). Slimeheads are very slow-growing and long-lived fish; the orange roughy ranks among the longest-lived animals known, with a maximum reported age of 149 years (however, this age is disputed). Predators of slimeheads are not well known, but include large deep-roving sharks, cutthroat eels, merluccid hakes, and snake mackerels.
