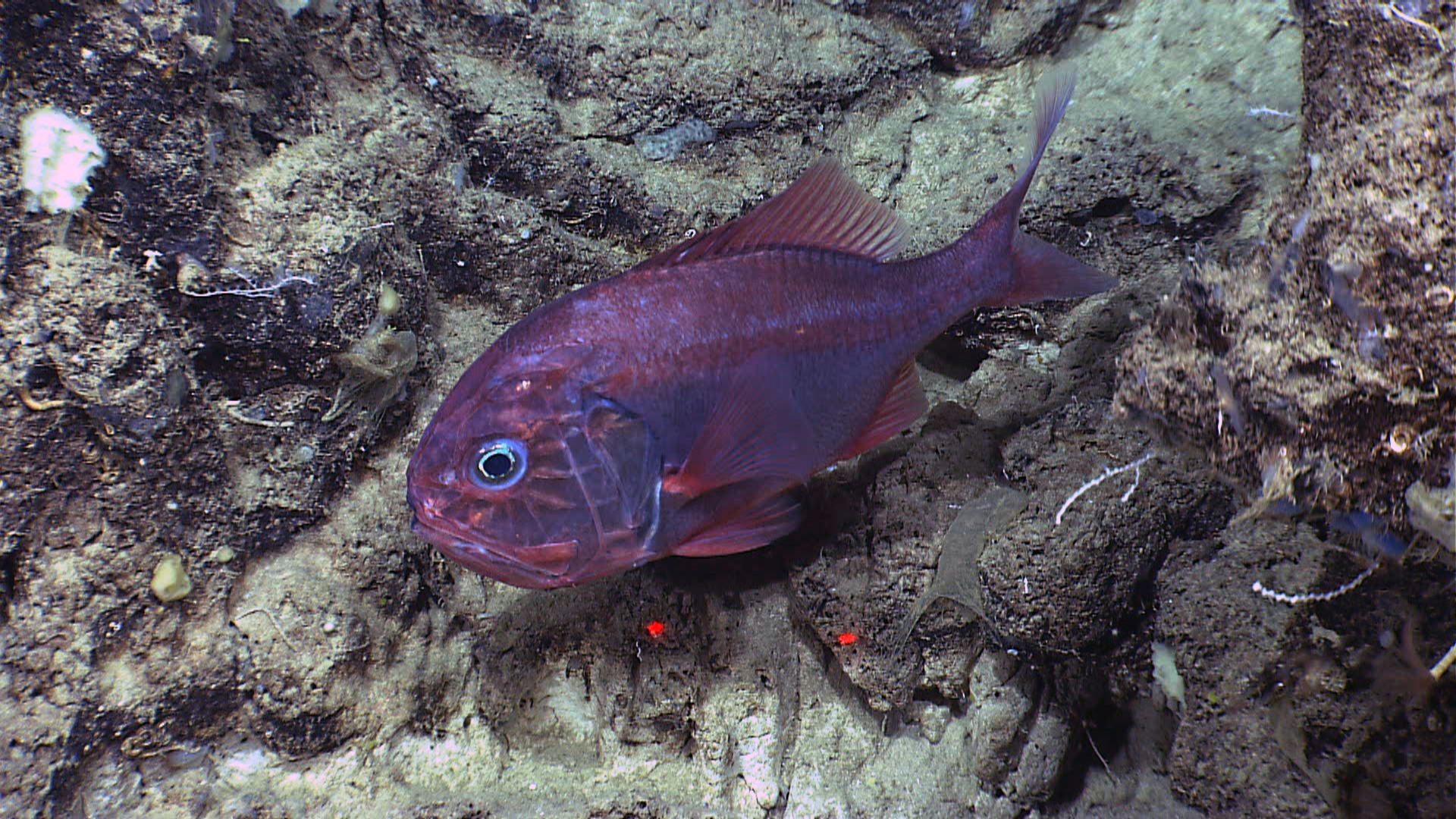
- Orange roughy (Hoplostethus atlanticus)
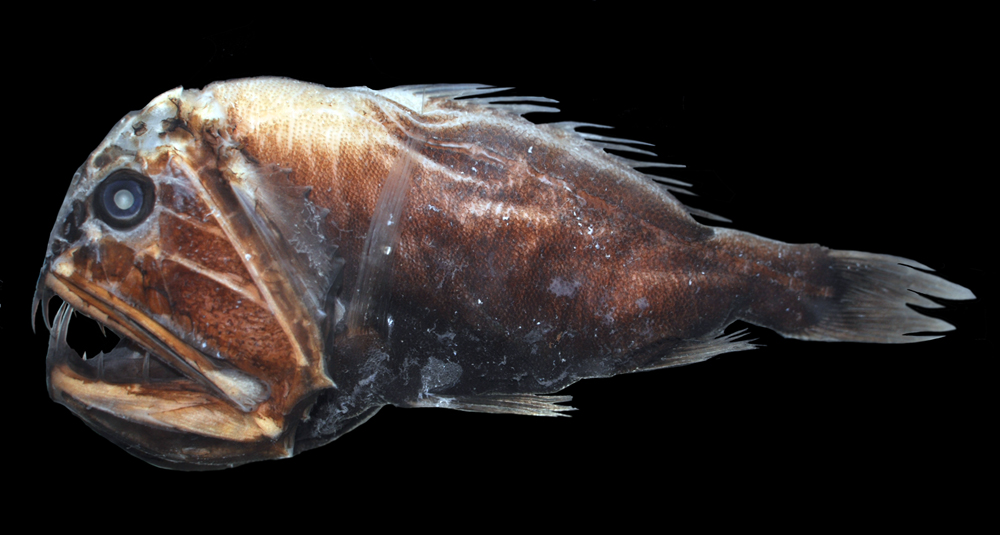
- Common fangtooth (Anoplogaster cornuta)

Scientific classification
- Kingdom: Animalia
- Phylum: Chordata
- Class: Actinopterygii
- Division: Teleostei
- Superorder: Acanthopterygii
- Order: Trachichthyiformes; Moore, 1993

Families
- Anoplogastridae (Fangtooths); Diretmidae (Spinyfins); Anomalopidae (Flashlight fishes); Monocentridae (Pinecone fishes); Trachichthyidae (Roughies)

= Trachichthyiformes =

Trachichthyiformes Temporal range: Cenomanian–present

Order of ray-finned fishes

The Trachichthyiformes /træˈkɪkθi.ɪfɔːrmiːz/ are an order of ray-finned fishes in the clade Acanthomorpha, consisting of 5 families, 20 genera, and over 70 species. The order includes the flashlight fishes, fangtooth fishes, spinyfins, pineconefishes, and roughies. They are exclusively marine fish, with many species inhabiting the deep sea.

== Etymology ==
The name comes from Ancient Greek τραχύς (trakhús), meaning "rough", ἰχθύς (ikhthús), meaning "fish", and Latin formes, meaning "form".

== Physical characteristics ==
Most species possess a laterally flattened, high-backed body and reach lengths ranging from 16 to 55 cm (6.3 to 21.7 in). The caudal fin is forked, and the head and operculum are often covered with small spines.

Diagnostic traits (synapomorphies) of the order include:

- An X-shaped arrangement of ridges on the frontal bone.
- Bony arches on the lacrimal bone (the first infraorbital bone) and the third infraorbital.
- A small ethmoid bone located between the dorsomedial sections of the lateral ethmoids.

== Distribution and ecology ==
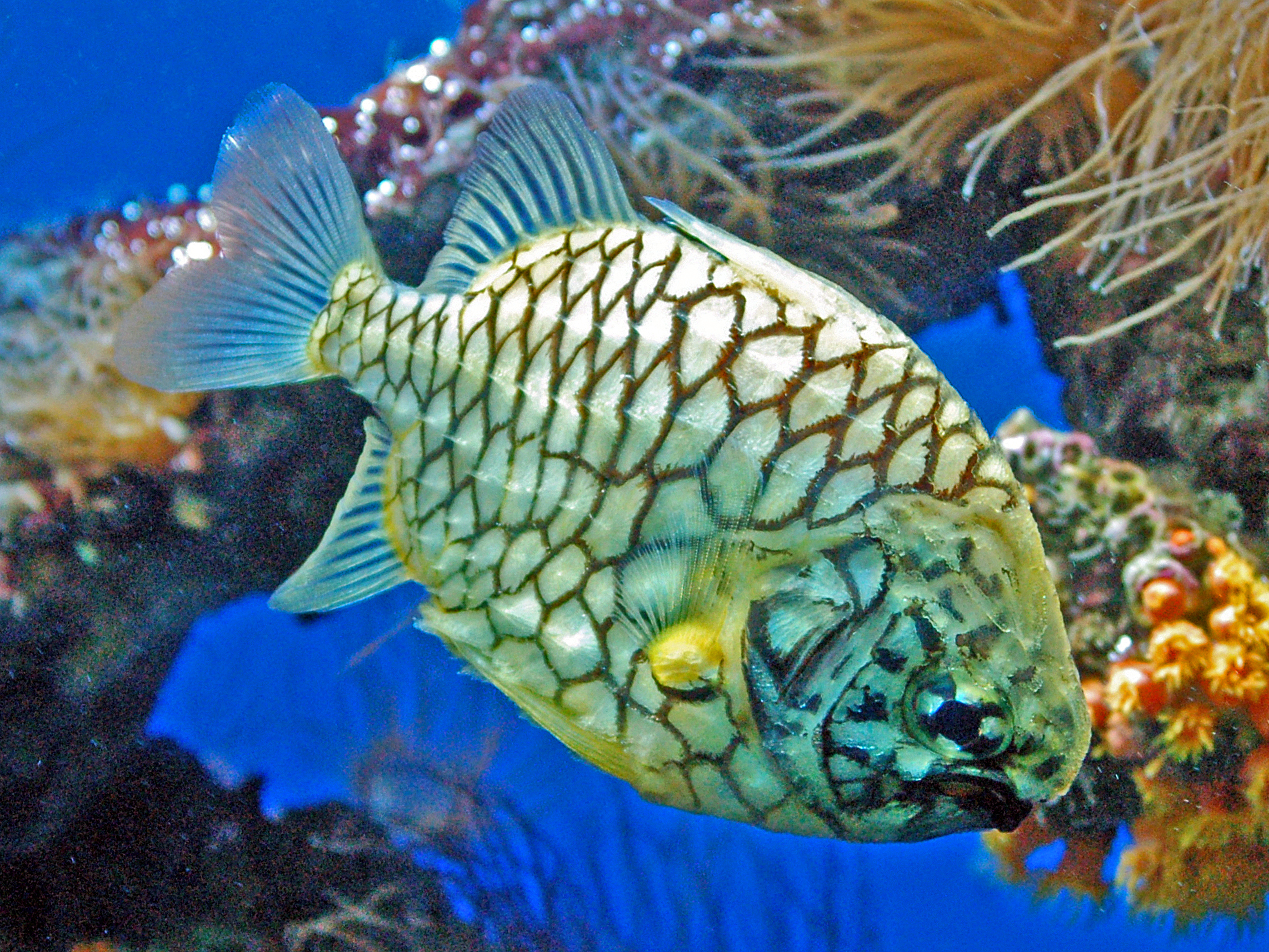
Pineapplefish (Cleidopus gloriamaris)

Trachichthyiformes are distributed worldwide, ranging from coastal waters to the deep sea.

- Anomalopidae (Flashlight fishes) and Monocentridae (Pineconefishes) typically live in schools in coral reefs, ranging from shallow waters down to depths of 350 m (1,150 ft).
- Trachichthyidae (Roughies) are found at depths between 2 m (6.6 ft) and 1,500 m (4,900 ft).
- Anoplogastridae (Fangtooths) and Diretmidae (Spinyfins) inhabit deeper waters, typically between 200 m (660 ft) and 3,000 m (9,800 ft).

Many species, particularly within the families Anomalopidae, Monocentridae, and Trachichthyidae, possess bioluminescent organs containing symbiotic, light-producing bacteria. In flashlight fishes, these organs are located below the eyes; in pineconefishes, they are on the lower jaw; and in some roughies, they are situated around the anus.

Little is known about the reproduction of Trachichthyiformes. They are likely broadcast spawners and do not exhibit parental care. Spawning aggregations have been observed, and pelagic eggs and larvae are known for some species.

A number of species are caught commercially, most notably the orange roughy (Hoplostethus atlanticus).

== Taxonomy and phylogeny ==
The ordinal name Trachichthyiformes was introduced in 1993 by the deep-sea fish specialist Jon A. Moore. He grouped the families previously placed in the orders Stephanoberyciformes and Beryciformes (in the traditional sense), with two notable exceptions:

1. The Holocentridae (squirrelfishes and soldierfishes), which were found to be more closely related to the Percomorpha (perch-likes) than to other beryciforms.
2. The Berycidae (alfonsinos), for which Moore could not find shared characteristics with the remaining families.

Because the family Berycidae (the type family of Beryciformes) was excluded from the new grouping, the name Beryciformes could not be applied to the remaining clade. Moore chose the name Trachichthyiformes, derived from the family Trachichthyidae.

In the 5th edition of Fishes of the World (2016), Beryciformes and Trachichthyiformes are treated as separate orders within the clade Berycimorpha. These two orders are sister groups, having diverged more than 100 million years ago.

=== Families ===
The order contains the following families:

- Anoplogastridae (Fangtooths)
- Diretmidae (Spinyfins)
- Anomalopidae (Flashlight fishes)
- Monocentridae (Pineconefishes)
- Trachichthyidae (Roughies)

Of the nearly 70 species in the order, more than 50 belong to the family Trachichthyidae; the other four families each contain fewer than ten species.

=== Fossil record ===
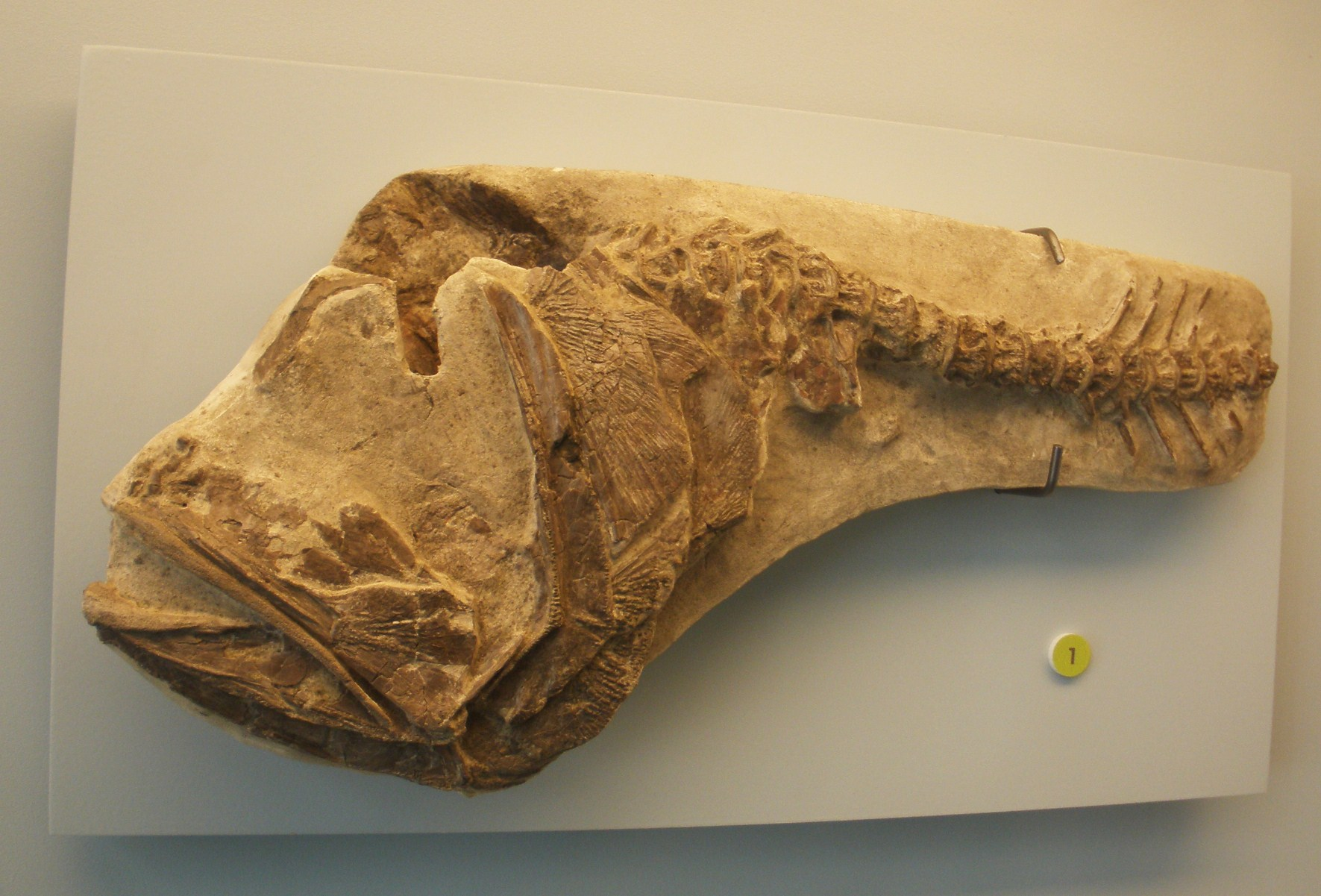
Fossil specimen of Hoplopteryx

Fossils assigned to Trachichthyiformes are known from as early as the Cretaceous period. The lineage likely diverged from the Beryciformes between 124 and 143 million years ago.

The following fossil trachichthyiform genera are known:

- †Acrogaster Agassiz, 1839
- †Antarctiberyx Grande & Chatterjee, 1987
- †Gnathoberyx Patterson, 1967
- †Hgulichthys Otero, Dutour & Gayet, 1995
- †Hoplopteryx Agassiz, 1839
- †Judeoberyx Gayet, 1980
- †Libanoberyx Gayet, 1980
- †Lissoberyx Patterson, 1967
- †Lobopterus Gorjanović-Kramberger, 1895
- ?†Pepemkay Alvarado-Ortega & Than-Marchese, 2013 (potentially a holocentroid or an indeterminate acanthopterygian)
- †Stichoberyx Gaudant, 1978
- †Stichopteryx Gaudant, 1969
- †Tubantia Patterson, 1964

=== Cladogram ===
A phylogeny based on the work of Betancur-Rodriguez et al. (2017) places Trachichthyiformes as the sister group to Beryciformes in the clade Berycimorpha.

- Acanthopterygii
  - Berycimorpha
    - Beryciformes
      - Berycoidei
        - Melamphaidae
        - Berycidae
      - Stephanoberycoidei
        - Cetomimidae
        - - Rondeletiidae
          - - Barbourisiidae
            - Stephanoberycidae
    - Trachichthyiformes
      - Diretmidae
      - Trachichthyoidea
        - - Monocentridae
          - Anomalopidae
        - Trachichthyidae
  - - Holocentrimorpha
      - Holocentriformes
        Holocentridae
    - Percomorpha
      (many orders and families)
