= List of fish families =

This is a list of fish families sorted alphabetically by scientific name. There are 525 families in the list.

A - B - C - D - E - F - G - H - I - J - K - L - M - N - O - P - R - S - T - U - V - W - X - Y - Z

== A ==
Ab-Am - An-Ap - Ar-Au

=== Ab-Am ===
- Abyssocottinae
- Acanthuridae
- Acestrorhynchidae
- Achiridae
- Achiropsettidae
- Acipenseridae
- Acropomatidae
- Adrianichthyidae
- Agonidae
- Akysidae
- Albulidae
- Alepisauridae
- Alepocephalidae
- Alestiidae
- Alopiidae
- Amarsipidae
- Ambassidae
- Amblycipitidae
- Amblyopsidae
- Amiidae
- Ammodytidae
- Amphiliidae

=== An-Ap ===
- Anabantidae
- Anablepidae
- Anacanthobatidae
- Anarhichadidae
- Anguillidae
- Anomalopidae
- Anoplogastridae
- Anoplopomatidae
- Anostomidae
- Anotopteridae
- Antennariidae
- Aphaniidae
- Aphredoderidae
- Aphyonidae
- Apistidae
- Aploactinidae
- Aplocheilidae
- Aplodactylidae
- Apogonidae
- Apteronotidae

=== Ar-Au ===
- Aracanidae
- Arapaimidae
- Argentinidae
- Ariidae
- Ariommatidae
- Arripidae
- Artedidraconidae
- Aspredinidae
- Astroblepidae
- Ateleopodidae
- Atherinidae
- Atherinopsidae
- Auchenipteridae
- Aulopidae
- Aulorhynchidae
- Aulostomidae

== B ==
- Bagridae
- Balistidae
- Balitoridae
- Banjosidae
- Barbourisiidae
- Bathyclupeidae
- Bathydraconidae
- Bathylagidae
- Bathylutichthyidae
- Bathymasteridae
- Batrachoididae
- Bedotiidae
- Belonidae
- Bembridae
- Berycidae
- Blenniidae
- Bothidae
- Bovichtidae
- Brachaeluridae
- Brachionichthyidae
- Bramidae
- Bregmacerotidae
- Bythitidae

== C ==
Ca - Ce - Ch - Ci-Cu - Cy

=== Ca ===
- Caesionidae
- Callanthiidae
- Callichthyidae
- Callionymidae
- Callorhinchidae
- Caproidae
- Caracanthidae
- Carangidae
- Carapidae
- Carcharhinidae
- Caristiidae
- Catostomidae
- Caulophrynidae

=== Ce ===
- Centracanthidae
- Centrarchidae
- Centriscidae
- Centrogenyidae
- Centrolophidae
- Centrophoridae
- Centrophrynidae
- Centropomidae
- Cepolidae
- Ceratiidae
- Ceratodontidae
- Cetomimidae
- Cetopsidae
- Cetorhinidae

=== Ch ===
- Chacidae
- Chaenopsidae
- Chaetodontidae
- Champsodontidae
- Chanidae
- Channichthyidae
- Channidae
- Characidae
- Chaudhuriidae
- Chaunacidae
- Cheilodactylidae
- Chiasmodontidae
- Chilodidae
- Chimaeridae
- Chirocentridae
- Chironemidae
- Chlamydoselachidae
- Chlopsidae
- Chlorophthalmidae

=== Ci-Cu ===
- Cichlidae
- Cirrhitidae
- Citharidae
- Citharinidae
- Clariidae
- Clinidae
- Clupeidae
- Cobitidae
- Coiidae
- Colocongridae
- Comephoridae
- Congiopodidae
- Congridae
- Coryphaenidae
- Cottidae
- Cottocomephoridae
- Cranoglanididae
- Creediidae
- Crenuchidae
- Cryptacanthodidae
- Ctenoluciidae
- Curimatidae

=== Cy ===
- Cyclopteridae
- Cyematidae
- Cynodontidae
- Cynoglossidae
- Cyprinidae
- Cyprinodontidae

== D ==
- Dactylopteridae
- Dactyloscopidae
- Dalatiidae
- Dasyatidae
- Dentatherinidae
- Denticipitidae
- Derichthyidae
- Diceratiidae
- Dichistiidae
- Dinolestidae
- Dinopercidae
- Diodontidae
- Diplomystidae
- Diretmidae
- Doradidae
- Draconettidae
- Drepaneidae
- Dussumieriidae

== E ==
- Echeneidae
- Echinorhinidae
- Elassomatidae
- Electrophoridae
- Eleginopidae
- Eleotridae
- Elopidae
- Embiotocidae
- Emmelichthyidae
- Engraulidae
- Enoplosidae
- Ephippidae
- Epigonidae
- Erethistidae
- Ereuniidae
- Erythrinidae
- Esocidae
- Euclichthyidae
- Eurypharyngidae
- Evermannellidae
- Exocoetidae

== F ==
- Fistulariidae
- Fundulidae

== G ==
- Gadidae
- Galaxiidae
- Gasteropelecidae
- Gasterosteidae
- Gastromyzontidae
- Gempylidae
- Geotriidae
- Gerreidae
- Gibberichthyidae
- Gigantactinidae
- Giganturidae
- Ginglymostomatidae
- Glaucosomatidae
- Gnathanacanthidae
- Gobiesocidae
- Gobiidae
- Gonorynchidae
- Gonostomatidae
- Goodeidae
- Grammatidae
- Grammicolepididae
- Gymnarchidae
- Gymnotidae
- Gymnuridae
- Gyrinocheilidae

== H ==
- Haemulidae
- Halosauridae
- Harpagiferidae
- Helogeneidae
- Helostomatidae
- Hemigaleidae
- Hemiodontidae
- Hemiramphidae
- Hemiscylliidae
- Hemitripteridae
- Hepsetidae
- Heptapteridae
- Heterenchelyidae
- Heterodontidae
- Heteropneustidae
- Hexagrammidae
- Hexanchidae
- Hexatrygonidae
- Himantolophidae
- Hiodontidae
- Hispidoberycidae
- Holocentridae
- Hoplichthyidae
- Hypopomidae
- Hypoptychidae

== I ==
- Icosteidae
- Ictaluridae
- Indostomidae
- Inermiidae
- Ipnopidae
- Istiophoridae

== K ==
- Kneriidae
- Kraemeriidae
- Kuhliidae
- Kurtidae
- Kyphosidae

== L ==
La-Li - Lo-Lu

=== La-Li ===
- Labridae
- Labrisomidae
- Lactariidae
- Lamnidae
- Lampridae
- Latimeriidae
- Latridae
- Lebiasinidae
- Leiognathidae
- Lepidogalaxiidae
- Lepidosirenidae
- Lepisosteidae
- Leptobramidae
- Leptochariidae
- Leptochilichthyidae
- Leptoscopidae
- Lethrinidae
- Linophrynidae
- Liparidae

=== Lo-Lu ===
- Lobotidae
- Lophichthyidae
- Lophiidae
- Lophotidae
- Loricariidae
- Lotidae
- Luciocephalidae
- Lutjanidae
- Luvaridae

== M ==
Ma-Mi - Mo-My

=== Ma-Mi ===
- Macrouridae
- Malacanthidae
- Malapteruridae
- Mastacembelidae
- Megachasmidae
- Megalomycteridae
- Megalopidae
- Melamphaidae
- Melanocetidae
- Melanonidae
- Melanotaeniidae
- Menidae
- Merlucciidae
- Microdesmidae
- Microstomatidae
- Mirapinnidae
- Mitsukurinidae

=== Mo-My ===
- Mochokidae
- Molidae
- Monacanthidae
- Monocentridae
- Monodactylidae
- Monognathidae
- Moridae
- Moringuidae
- Mormyridae
- Moronidae
- Mugilidae
- Mullidae
- Muraenesocidae
- Muraenidae
- Muraenolepididae
- Myctophidae
- Myliobatidae
- Myrocongridae
- Myxinidae

== N ==
- Nandidae
- Narcinidae
- Nematistiidae
- Nematogenyidae
- Nemichthyidae
- Nemipteridae
- Neoceratiidae
- Neoceratodontidae
- Neoscopelidae
- Neosebastidae
- Nettastomatidae
- Nomeidae
- Normanichthyidae
- Notacanthidae
- Notocheiridae
- Notograptidae
- Notopteridae
- Notosudidae
- Nototheniidae

== O ==
- Odacidae
- Odontaspididae
- Odontobutidae
- Ogcocephalidae
- Olyridae
- Omosudidae
- Oneirodidae
- Ophichthidae
- Ophidiidae
- Opisthoproctidae
- Opistognathidae
- Oplegnathidae
- Orectolobidae
- Oreosomatidae
- Osmeridae
- Osphronemidae
- Osteoglossidae
- Ostraciidae
- Ostracoberycidae
- Oxynotidae

== P ==
Pa-Pe - Ph-Pl - Po-Pr - Ps-Pt

=== Pa-Pe ===
- Pangasiidae
- Pantodontidae
- Parabembridae
- Parabrotulidae
- Parakysidae moved to Akysidae
- Paralepididae
- Paralichthyidae
- Parascorpididae
- Parascylliidae
- Paraulopidae
- Parazenidae
- Parodontidae
- Pataecidae
- Pegasidae
- Pempheridae
- Pentacerotidae
- Percichthyidae
- Percidae
- Perciliidae
- Percophidae
- Percopsidae
- Peristediidae
- Petromyzontidae

=== Ph-Pl ===
- Phallostethidae
- Pholidae
- Pholidichthyidae
- Phosichthyidae
- Phractolaemidae
- Phycidae
- Pimelodidae
- Pinguipedidae
- Platycephalidae
- Platytroctidae
- Plecoglossidae
- Plectrogenidae
- Plesiobatidae
- Plesiopidae
- Pleuronectidae
- Plotosidae

=== Po-Pr ===
- Poeciliidae
- Polycentridae
- Polymixiidae
- Polynemidae
- Polyodontidae
- Polyprionidae
- Polypteridae
- Pomacanthidae
- Pomacentridae
- Pomatomidae
- Potamotrygonidae
- Priacanthidae
- Pristidae
- Pristiophoridae
- Prochilodontidae
- Profundulidae
- Proscylliidae
- Protopteridae

=== Ps-Pt ===
- Psettodidae
- Pseudaphritidae
- Pseudocarchariidae
- Pseudochromidae
- Pseudomugilidae
- Pseudopimelodidae
- Pseudotriakidae
- Pseudotrichonotidae
- Psilorhynchidae
- Psychrolutidae
- Ptereleotridae
- Ptilichthyidae

== R ==
- Rachycentridae
- Radiicephalidae
- Rajidae
- Regalecidae
- Retropinnidae
- Rhamphichthyidae
- Rhamphocottidae
- Rhincodontidae
- Rhinobatidae
- Rhinochimaeridae
- Rhyacichthyidae
- Rivulidae
- Rondeletiidae

== S ==
Sa-Sc - Se-St - Su-Sy

=== Sa-Sc ===
- Saccopharyngidae
- Salangidae
- Salmonidae
- Samaridae
- Scaridae
- Scatophagidae
- Schilbeidae
- Schindleriidae
- Sciaenidae
- Scoloplacidae
- Scomberesocidae
- Scombridae
- Scombrolabracidae
- Scombropidae
- Scopelarchidae
- Scophthalmidae
- Scorpaenidae
- Scyliorhinidae
- Scytalinidae

=== Se-St ===
- Sebastidae
- Serranidae
- Serrasalmidae
- Serrivomeridae
- Setarchidae
- Siganidae
- Sillaginidae
- Siluridae
- Sisoridae
- Soleidae
- Solenostomidae
- Sparidae
- Sphyraenidae
- Sphyrnidae
- Squalidae
- Squatinidae
- Stegostomatidae
- Stephanoberycidae
- Sternoptychidae
- Sternopygidae
- Stichaeidae
- Stomiidae
- Stromateidae
- Stylephoridae

=== Su-Sy ===
- Sundasalangidae
- Symphysanodontidae
- Synanceiidae
- Synaphobranchidae
- Synbranchidae
- Syngnathidae
- Synodontidae

== T ==
- Telmatherinidae
- Terapontidae
- Tetrabrachiidae
- Tetragonuridae
- Tetraodontidae
- Tetrarogidae
- Thaumatichthyidae
- Torpedinidae
- Toxotidae
- Trachichthyidae
- Trachinidae
- Trachipteridae
- Triacanthidae
- Triacanthodidae
- Triakidae
- Trichiuridae
- Trichodontidae
- Trichomycteridae
- Trichonotidae
- Triglidae
- Triodontidae
- Tripterygiidae

== U ==
- Umbridae
- Uranoscopidae
- Urolophidae

== V ==
- Valenciidae
- Veliferidae

== X ==
- Xenisthmidae
- Xiphiidae

== Z ==
- Zanclidae
- Zaniolepididae
- Zaproridae
- Zeidae
- Zenionidae
- Zoarcidae
