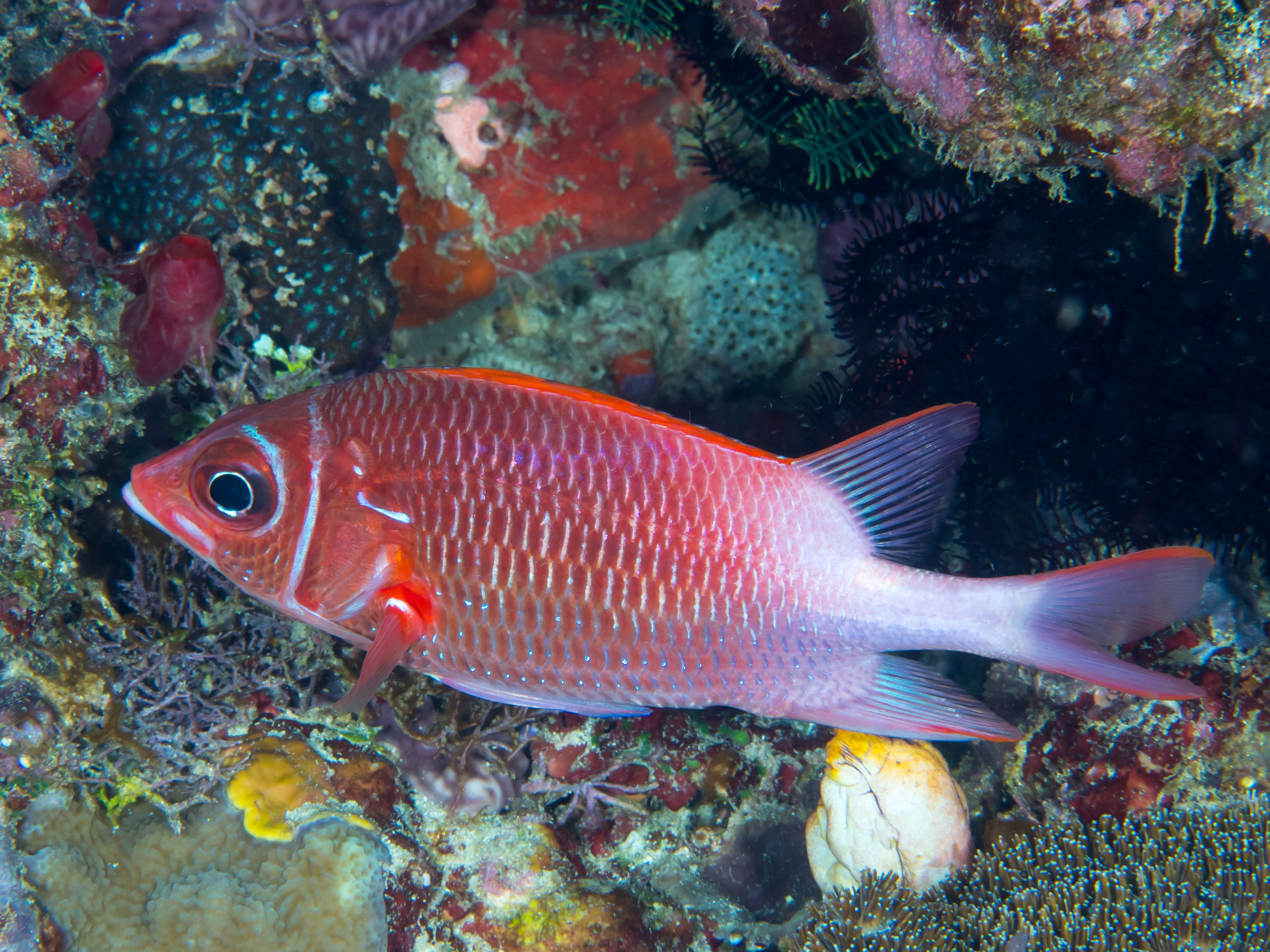
- Sargocentron caudimaculatum
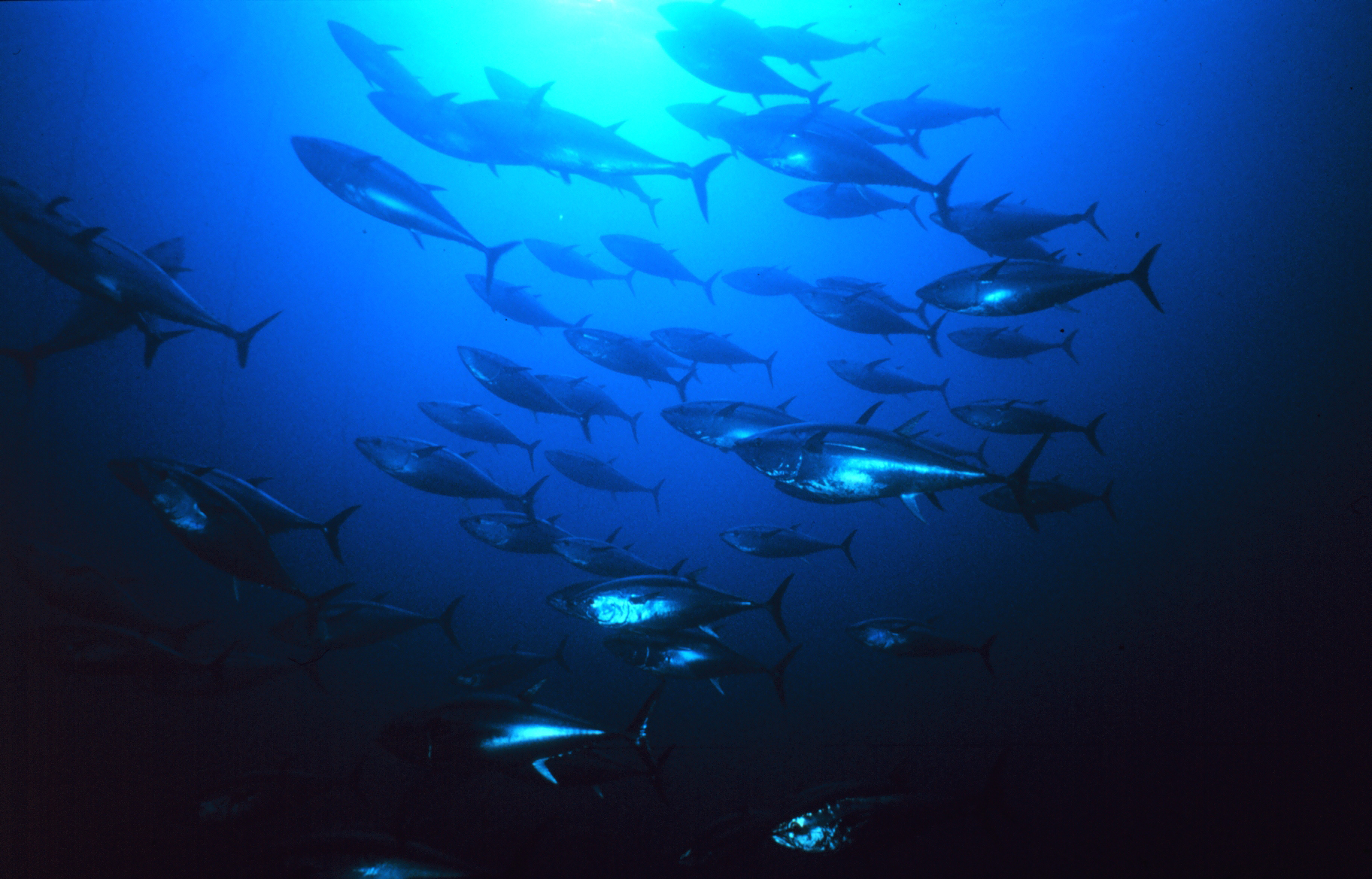
- Group of Atlantic bluefin tuna (Thunnus thynnus) in Italy

Scientific classification
- Kingdom: Animalia
- Phylum: Chordata
- Class: Actinopterygii
- Division: Teleostei
- Clade: Acanthomorpha
- Superorder: Acanthopterygii; Rosen & Patterson, 1969

Subdivisions
- Trachichthyiformes; Beryciformes; Percomorpha (see text)

= Acanthopterygii =

Acanthopterygii Temporal range: Cenomanian–present

Superorder of bony fishes

Acanthopterygii is a superorder of bony fishes in the class Actinopterygii. Members of this superorder are sometimes called ray-finned fishes for the characteristic sharp, bony rays in their fins; however, this name is often given to the class Actinopterygii as a whole.

The suborder includes the berycids and their allies, but by far the largest member of the group is the Percomorpha, the most diverse vertebrate clade.

== Taxonomy ==
The following taxonomy is based on ECoF (2025), with subseries based on earlier studies:

- Series Berycida
  - Order Trachichthyiformes, including pineconefishes, slimeheads & fangtooths
  - Order Beryciformes
    - Suborder Holocentroidei, squirrelfish & soldierfish
    - Suborder Berycoidei, alfonsinos & berycids
    - Suborder Stephanoberycoidei, pricklefishes, whalefishes & gibberfishes
- Series Percomorpha
  - Subseries Ophidiida
    - Order Ophidiiformes, including cusk-eels, brotulas & pearlfishes
  - Subseries Batrachoidida
    - Order Batrachoidiformes, toadfishes
  - Subseries Gobiida
    - Order Kurtiformes, nurseryfishes & cardinalfishes
    - Order Gobiiformes, gobies, sleepers & allies
  - Subseries Pelagiaria
    - Order Scombriformes, mackerels, tuna, bluefishes, ragfishes, pomfrets, cutlassfish, swallowers, medusafish, & allies
  - Subseries Syngnatharia
    - Order Syngnathiformes, seahorses, pipefishes, trumpetfishes, goatfishes, gurnards, seamoths & allies
  - Subseries Anabantaria
    - Order Anabantiformes, including labyrinth fishes, snakeheads & badids
    - Order Synbranchiformes, including the swamp eels
  - Subseries Carangaria
    - Order Carangiformes, including jacks, flatfish, barracudas, billfish, & allies
  - Subseries Ovalentaria
    - Order Atheriniformes, including silversides and rainbowfishes
    - Order Beloniformes, including the flyingfishes, ricefish, needlefishes & halfbeaks
    - Order Cyprinodontiformes, including livebearers, killifishes, rivulines & pupfishes
    - Order Cichliformes, cichlids, leaffishes & convict blenny
    - Order Mugiliformes, mullets & Asiatic glassfish
    - Order Blenniiformes, including blennies, clingfishes, dottybacks, jawfishes, damselfishes & anemonefishes
  - Subseries Eupercaria
    - Order Perciformes, including groupers, perches, darters, notothens, flatheads, searobins, scorpionfish, sculpins, sticklebacks, eelpouts & allies
    - Order Centrarchiformes, including temperate perch, knifejaws, sea chubs, freshwater sunfish, hawkfishes & allies
    - Order Labriformes, including wrasses, sandlances, stargazers & allies
    - Order Acropomatiformes, including lanternbellies, gnomefishes, wreckfishes, banjofish, oceanic basslets, armorheads & allies
    - Order Acanthuriformes, including surgeonfishes, butterflyfishes, rabbitfishes, marine angelfishes, drumfish, grunts, ponyfishes, mojarras, snappers, temperate basses, spadefishes, porgies, scats, bigeyes, boarfishes & allies
    - Order Lophiiformes, anglerfishes
    - Order Tetraodontiformes, including the filefishes, pufferfishes, porcupinefishes, triggerfishes, boxfishes, and ocean sunfish

=== Phylogeny ===
The cladogram is based on Near et al., 2012 and Betancur-Rodriguez et al. 2016.

- Acanthopterygii
  - - Berycimorphaceae
      - Beryciformes (alfonsinos; whalefishes)
      - Trachichthyiformes (pinecone fishes & slimeheads)
  - - Holocentrimorphaceae
      Holocentriformes (Soldier fishes & squirrel fishes)
    - Percomorpha
      - Ophidiiformes (cusk-eels)
      - - Batrachoidiformes (toadfishes)
        - - - Syngnathomorpharia
              - Scombroidei (tunas, mackerel)
              - Syngnathiformes (seahorses)
          - - - Gobiomopharia
                - Kurtiformes (cardinalfishes; nurseryfishes)
                - Gobiiformes (gobies)
            - - Carangimopharia
                - - - Synbranchiformes
                    - Anabantiformes
                  - - Carangiformes (jacks)
                    - Istiophoriformes (billfish)
                    - Pleuronectiformes (flatfish)
                - Ovalentariae
                  - Cichliformes
                  - Mugiliformes
                  - Atherinomorphae
                    - Beloniformes
                    - - Cyprinodontiformes
                      - Atheriniformes
                  - Blenniimorphae
                    - Gobiesociformes
                    - Blenniiformes
              - Percomorpharia
                - Labridae (wrasses)
                - - - Perciformes (perches, seabasses, sticklebacks, etc)
                    - - Centrarchiformes (blackbasses, temperate perches)
                      - Pempheriformes (sweepers, banjofish)
                  - - Acanthuroidei (surgeonfishes), Leiognathidae (ponyfishes), Chaetodontidae (butterflyfishes)
                    - - Siganidae (rabbitfishes), Scatophagidae (scats)
                      - - Lophiiformes (anglerfishes)
                        - Tetraodontiformes (pufferfishes)

== Sources ==
- Acanthopterygii at thefreedictionary.com
