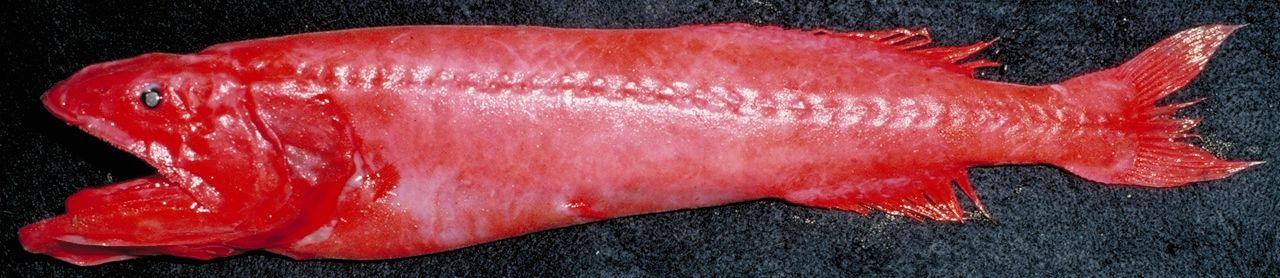
- Barbourisia rufa

Scientific classification (disputed)
- Domain: Eukaryota
- Kingdom: Animalia
- Phylum: Chordata
- Class: Actinopterygii
- Order: Beryciformes
- Suborder: Stephanoberycoidei
- Superfamily: Cetomimoidea; Nelson, 1994

Families
- Barbourisiidae; Cetomimidae; Rondeletiidae

= Cetomimoidea =

Whalefishes Temporal range: Early Eocene–recent

Order of ray-finned fishes

The Cetomimoidea or whalefishes are a superfamily of small, deep-sea ray-finned fish. Formerly treated as either their own order (Cetomimiformes) due to their unusual anatomy, more recent studies incorporating genetic data confirm them to be deeply nested within the Beryciformes as a clade within Stephanoberycoidei (which was formerly also treated as its own order). They are thus better treated as their own superfamily, Cetomimoidea.

Within this group are five families and approximately 18 genera and 32 species (but see below). Thought to have a circumglobal distribution throughout the tropical and temperate latitudes, whalefishes have been recorded at depths in excess of 3,500 metres.

== Taxonomy ==
Some recent phylogenetic studies suggest that the whalefishes are paraphyletic with respect to other members of the suborder, with Barbourisia belonging to the Stephanoberycidae while Rondeletiidae includes Hispidoberyx. Although previously thought to have ancient origins due to their unique morphological characteristics, phylogenetic studies suggest a Paleogene origin for the group.

Potentially the earliest fossil record of the group is of a Rondeletia-like whalefish from the earliest Eocene-aged Fur Formation of Denmark.

== Description ==
Named after their whale-shaped body (from the Greek ketos meaning "whale" or "sea monster", mimos meaning "imitative" and the Latin forma meaning "form"), the Cetomimiformes have extremely large mouths and highly distensible stomachs. Their eyes are very small or vestigial; the lateral line (composed of huge, hollow tubes) is consequently very well developed to compensate for life in the pitch black depths.

The dorsal and anal fins are set far back; all fins lack spines. The swim bladder is also absent, except in the larvae and juveniles which occur in the surface waters. Whalefish coloration is typically red to orange, sometimes with a black body. Some species possess light-producing organs called photophores; these are widespread among deep-sea fishes.

The largest known species reach a length of just 40 centimetres; most species are half this size. Sexual dimorphism is (apparently) exceptionally strong: males may only grow to 3.5 centimetres while females may be ten times as large. This is not uncommon among deep-sea fishes, with the males serving little use other than as suppliers of sperm: an even more extreme case are the parasitic males in deep-sea anglerfish.

== Families ==
- Cetomimidae — flabby whalefishes
- Rondeletiidae — redmouth whalefishes
- Barbourisiidae — velvet whalefish (monotypic)

The gibberfishes (Gibberichthyidae) on the other hand, usually placed in the Stephanoberyciformes sensu stricto, appear to be close relatives of the Rondeletiidae and Barbourisiidae, as has been occasionally proposed.
