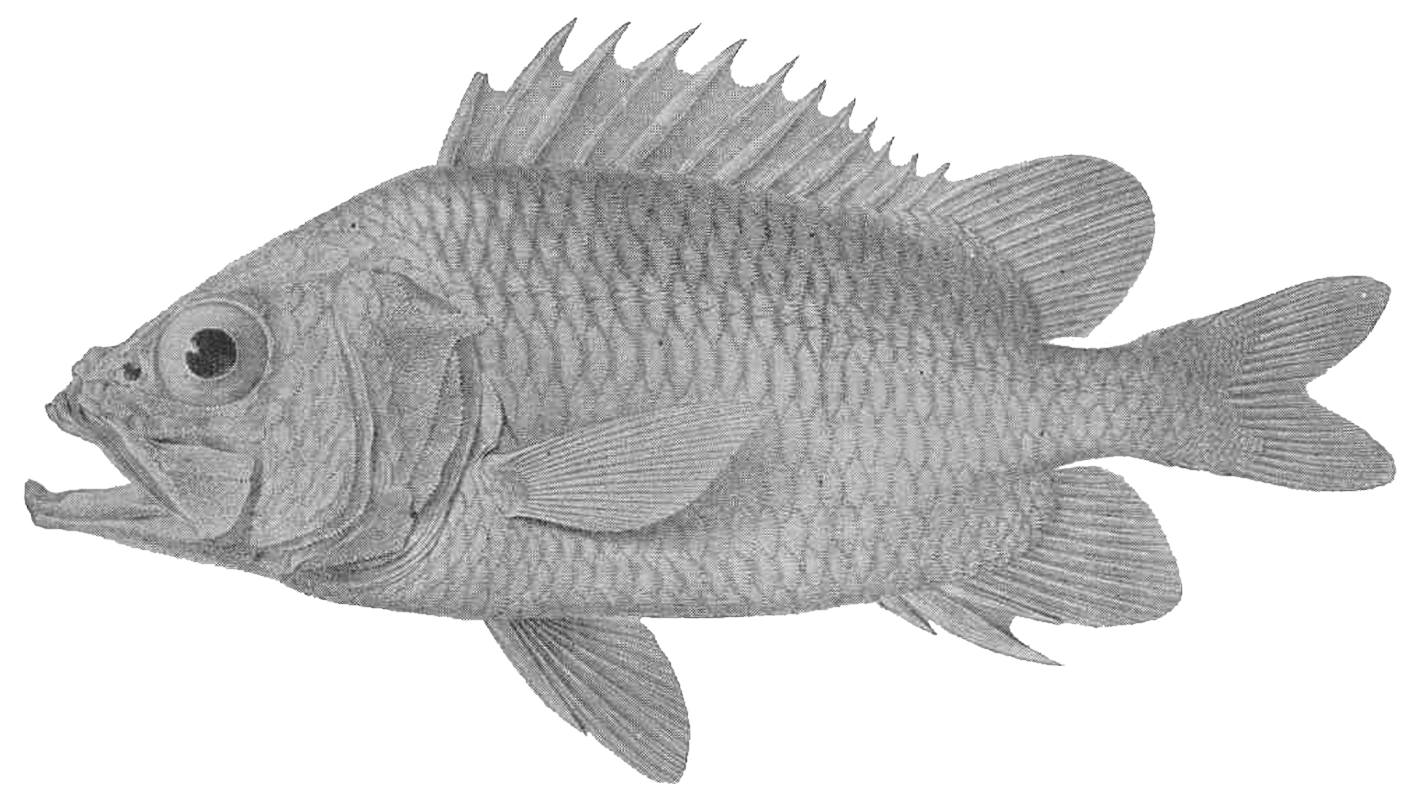

Conservation status
- Least Concern (IUCN 3.1)

Scientific classification
- Kingdom: Animalia
- Phylum: Chordata
- Class: Actinopterygii
- Order: Beryciformes
- Family: Holocentridae
- Genus: Ostichthys
- Species: O. archiepiscopus

Binomial name
- Ostichthys archiepiscopus Valenciennes, 1862

= Straighthead soldierfish =

Species of fish

The straighthead soldierfish (Ostichthys archiepiscopus) is a soldierfish species belonging to the family Holocentridae.

It is found in the Indian Ocean, near Mozambique, Réunion and Mauritius, and in the Pacific Ocean, near the Ryukyu Islands, Hawaii, Tahiti, and Mo'orea.
