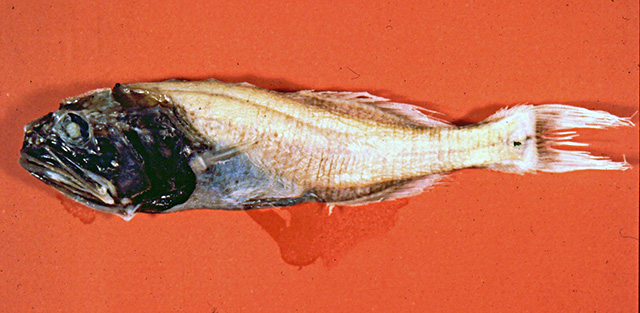

Conservation status
- Data Deficient (IUCN 3.1)

Scientific classification
- Kingdom: Animalia
- Phylum: Chordata
- Class: Actinopterygii
- Division: Teleostei
- Order: Beryciformes
- Family: Stephanoberycidae
- Genus: Abyssoberyx; Merrett & J. A. Moore, 2005
- Species: A. levisquamosus

Binomial name
- Abyssoberyx levisquamosus Merrett & J. A. Moore, 2005

= Abyssoberyx =

Genus of fishes

Abyssoberyx is a genus of pricklefish containing the single species Abyssoberyx levisquamosus. It is found in the northeast Atlantic Ocean at depths from 4,480 to 4,565 metres (14,698 to 14,977 ft), and in the Mariana Trench up to 5,961 metres (19,557 ft). This species grows to a length of 16.8 centimetres (6.6 in) SL.
