= Rondeletia =

Rondeletia is a genus name. It can refer to:

- Rondeletia, the redmouth whalefishes
- Rondeletia (plant), flowering plants in the madder family (Rubiaceae)
