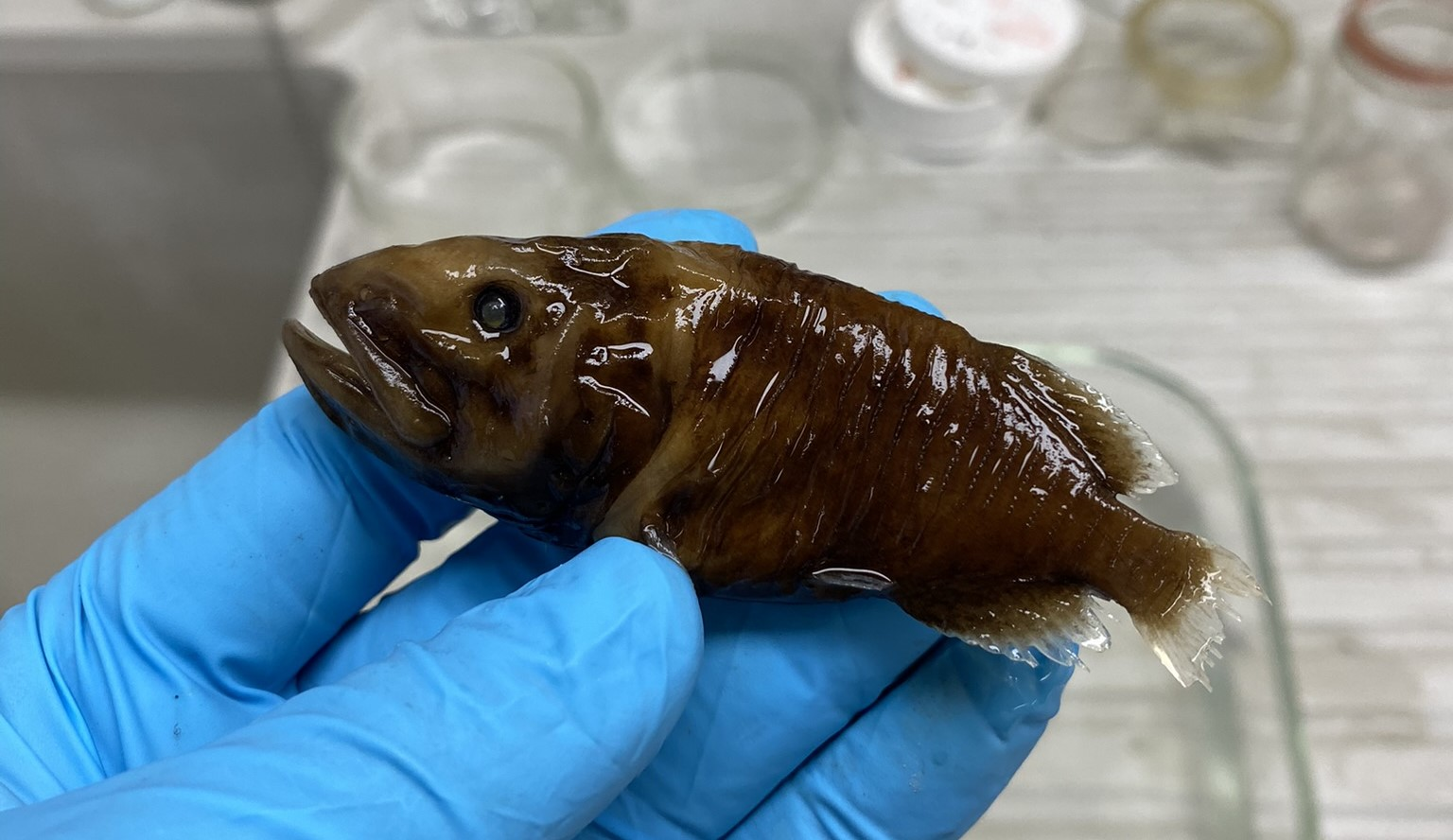
- Spirit-preserved specimen of R. loricata

Conservation status
- Least Concern (IUCN 3.1)

Scientific classification
- Kingdom: Animalia
- Phylum: Chordata
- Class: Actinopterygii
- Order: Beryciformes
- Family: Rondeletiidae
- Genus: Rondeletia
- Species: R. loricata

Binomial name
- Rondeletia loricata T. Abe & Hotta, 1963

= Rondeletia loricata =

Species of fish

Rondeletia loricata is a species of redmouth whalefish found in the temperate and tropical oceans at depths of from 100 to 3,500 m (330 to 11,480 ft). This species grows to a length of 11.0 cm (4.3 in). It is known to be a vertical migrant, occurring at shallower depths at night.
