= Acanthochaenus =

Conservation status
- Least Concern (IUCN 3.1)

Scientific classification
- Kingdom: Animalia
- Phylum: Chordata
- Class: Actinopterygii
- Order: Beryciformes
- Family: Stephanoberycidae
- Genus: Acanthochaenus; T. N. Gill, 1884
- Species: A. luetkenii

Binomial name
- Acanthochaenus luetkenii T. N. Gill, 1884

Species of fish

Acanthochaenus luetkenii, the pricklefish, is a species of pricklefish found in the oceans at depths of from 1,655 to 5,397 metres (5,430 to 17,707 ft). This species grows to a length of 14.1 centimetres (5.6 in) SL. This species is the only known member of the genus Acanthochaenus.
