= Dibrachichthys =

Conservation status
- Least Concern (IUCN 3.1)

Scientific classification
- Kingdom: Animalia
- Phylum: Chordata
- Class: Actinopterygii
- Order: Lophiiformes
- Family: Antennariidae
- Subfamily: Tetrabrachiinae
- Genus: Dibrachichthys; Pietsch, J. W. Johnson & R. J. Arnold, 2009
- Species: D. melanurus

Binomial name
- Dibrachichthys melanurus Pietsch, J. W. Johnson & R. J. Arnold, 2009

Species of fish

Dibrachichthys is a monospecific genus belonging to the subfamily Tetrabrachiinae, the four-armed frogfishes. The only species in the genus is Dibrachichthys melanurus, the twoarm humpback anglerfish, which is found in the eastern Indian and western Pacific Oceans.

== Taxonomy ==
Dibrachichthys was first proposed as a genus in 2009 by Theodore Wells Pietsch III, Jeffrey W. Johnson and Rachel J. Arnold when they described Dibrachichthys melanurus. The type locality of the new species was given as 11°06.9'S, 142°51.9'E, northeast of Ussher Point on the Cape York Peninsula in Queensland. This genus is one of two genera, both monotypic, in the family Tetrabrachiidae. The Tetrabrachiidae is classified within the suborder Antennarioidei within the order Lophiiformes, the anglerfishes.

== Etymology ==
Dibrachichthys combines di, meaning "two", brachium, meaning "arm", and ichthys, which means "fish". This is an allusion to the possession of a single undivided pectoral fin on each side, in contrast to the split pectoral fins of the only other species in the Tetrabrachiidae, Tetrabrachium ocellatum which has its pectoral fins divided. The specific name melanurus means "blacktail", and is a reference to the black bar on the base of the caudal fin.

== Description ==
Dibrachichthys has its dorsal fin supported by 14 or 15 soft rays and the anal fin is supported by between 8 and 10 soft rays. It is very similar to T. ocellatum but has a single, non divided pectoral fin on each side instead of T. ocellatum's split pectoral fins. The cranium is markedly wider than that of T. ocellatum and some of the skull bones form a horizontal tube-like structure to the front of each eye. The eyes are set in a deep semi-circular protective cavity and there is a deep depression in the middle of the cranium. The coloration is different too with a dark inside of the mouth, a dark bar on the back just below the base of the dorsal fin and a dark bar on the base of the caudal fin. Males have a maximum published standard length of 5.7 cm (2.2 in), while females are slightly smaller with a maximum published standard length of 5.6 cm (2.2 in).

== Distribution and habitat ==
Dibrachichthys is found in the Australia, Papua New Guinea and Indonesia. In Australia it is found around the north from southwest of Dongara in Western Australia to east of Yeppoon in the Capricorn Islands off Queensland. It also occurs in the Aru Islands of Indonesia and the Torres Strait off Papua New Guinea. This is a demersal fish found at depths between 5 and 63 m (20 and 210 ft), although two specimens were collected between 128 and 146 m (420 and 480 ft), on soft substrates of sand and mud in nearshore waters and in areas with rubble on the continental shelf.

== Biology ==
Dibrachichthys appears to be solitary and individuals are widely dispersed. The eggs are laid by the female in tight clusters bound with filaments. The females have the tips of some of the dorsal fin rays free of the membrane and in T. ocellatum, and probably in this species, the filaments of the egg cluster entangle round these tips and are kept there until they hatch.
