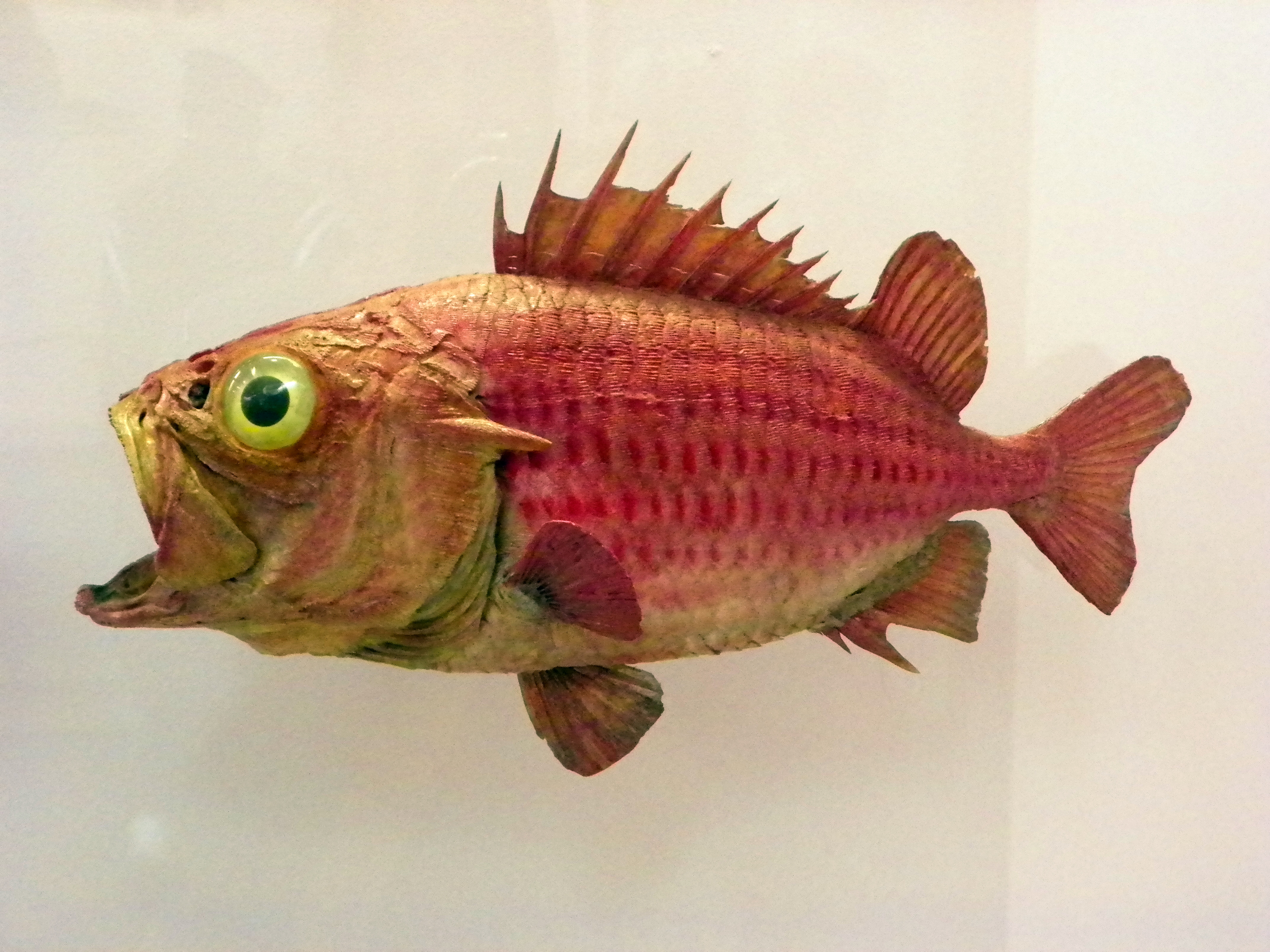

Conservation status
- Least Concern (IUCN 3.1)

Scientific classification
- Kingdom: Animalia
- Phylum: Chordata
- Class: Actinopterygii
- Order: Beryciformes
- Family: Holocentridae
- Genus: Ostichthys
- Species: O. japonicus

Binomial name
- Ostichthys japonicus Valenciennes, 1862

= Japanese soldierfish =

Species of fish

The Japanese soldierfish (Ostichthys japonicus), known also as brocade perch, is a soldierfish species belonging to the family Holocentridae.

It is found in the West Pacific, from southern Japan to the Andaman Islands, and near Australia. It is also known from Fiji and Tuvalu.

In Japan, it is known as ebisu dai (恵比寿 鯛).
