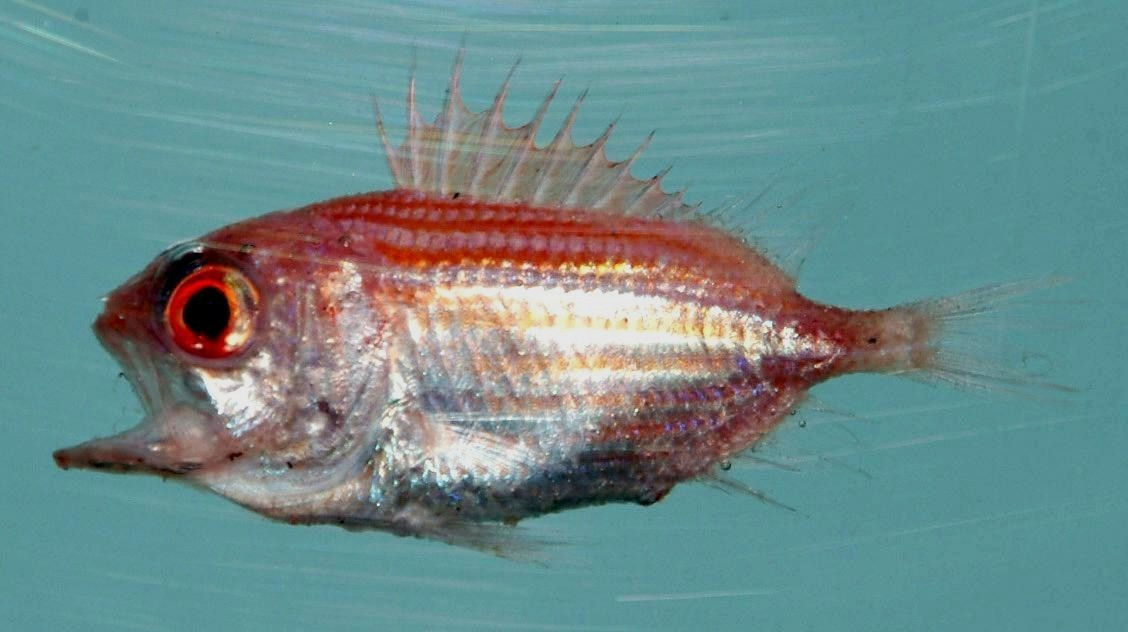

Conservation status
- Least Concern (IUCN 3.1)

Scientific classification
- Kingdom: Animalia
- Phylum: Chordata
- Class: Actinopterygii
- Order: Beryciformes
- Family: Holocentridae
- Genus: Ostichthys
- Species: O. trachypoma

Binomial name
- Ostichthys trachypoma Günther, 1859

= Bigeye soldierfish =

Species of fish

The bigeye soldierfish (Ostichthys trachypoma) is a soldierfish species belonging to the family Holocentridae.

== Description ==
The average length of the bigeye soldierfish as an unsexed male is about 20 cm or about 7.8 in. They are no threat to humans.

== Distribution and habitat ==
They are native to the Western Atlantic, being found near New York to the northern Gulf of Mexico and the Antilles, and near Brazil. They are known to be found in a demersal marine environment within a tropical environment.
