= Parabrotula tanseimaru =

Conservation status
- Data Deficient (IUCN 3.1)

Scientific classification
- Kingdom: Animalia
- Phylum: Chordata
- Class: Actinopterygii
- Order: Ophidiiformes
- Family: Parabrotulidae
- Genus: Parabrotula
- Species: P. tanseimaru

Binomial name
- Parabrotula tanseimaru Miya & Nielsen, 1991

Species of fish

Parabrotula tanseimaru is a species of ray-finned fish within the family Parabrotulidae, that is found off southern Japan in the Sagami Bay.

== Description ==
It is a bathypelagic species, swimming at depths up to 1,300 metres (4,270 ft) below sea level. It feeds on copepods and grows to around 4.9 centimetres (1.9 in) in length, with the largest specimen being 6.2 centimetres (2.4 in) in length. The species is only known from a single type locality collected off Sagami Bay, with 25 other specimens being caught in trawl nets up to 680 metres (2,230 ft) deep.

The species has been classified as 'Data deficient' by the IUCN Red List, as its current population is unknown, and no conversation efforts have been made towards it.
