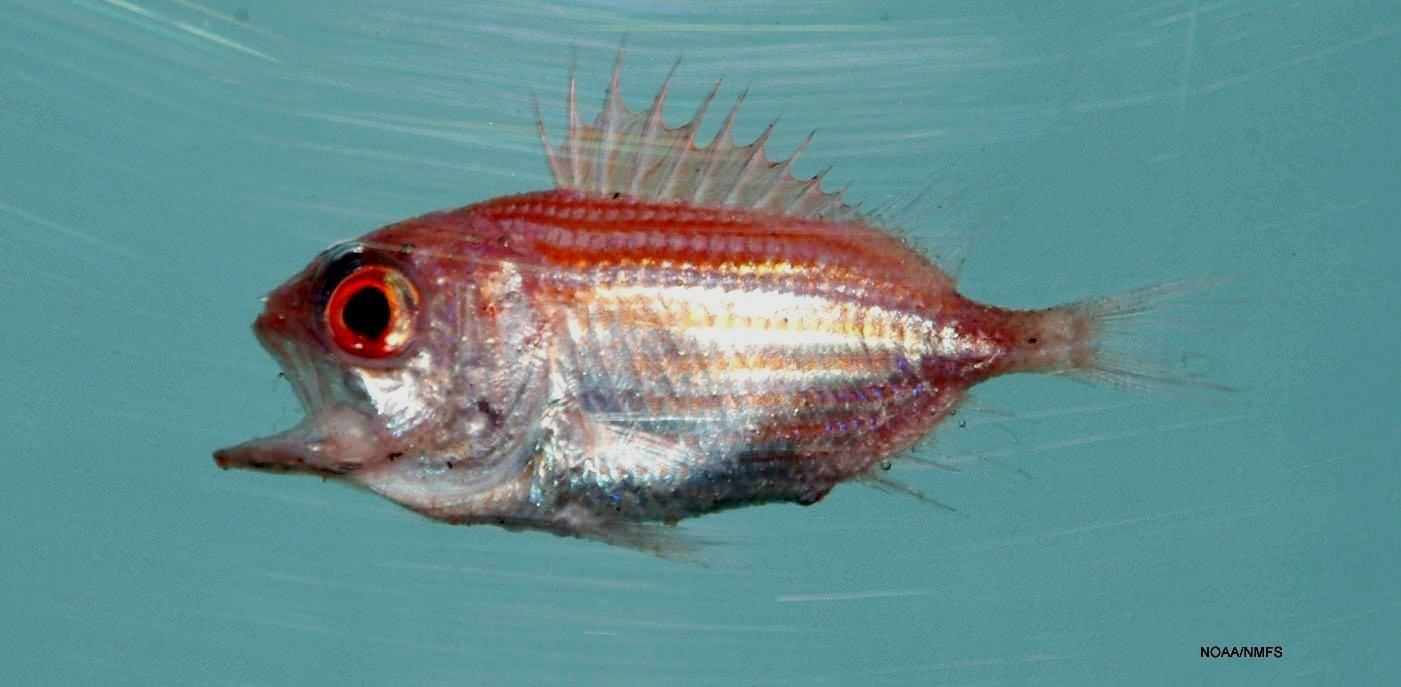
- Ostichthys trachypoma

Scientific classification
- Kingdom: Animalia
- Phylum: Chordata
- Class: Actinopterygii
- Order: Beryciformes
- Family: Holocentridae
- Subfamily: Myripristinae
- Genus: Ostichthys; G. Cuvier, 1829

Type species
- Myripristis japonicus G. Cuvier, 1829

= Ostichthys =

Genus of fishes

Ostichthys is a genus of fish in the family Holocentridae found in Atlantic, Indian and Pacific Ocean.

== Species ==
Fifteen species in this genus are recognized:

- Ostichthys acanthorhinus J. E. Randall, Shimizu & Yamakawa, 1982 (spiny-snout soldierfish)
- Ostichthys archiepiscopus (Valenciennes, 1862) (straight-head soldierfish)
- Ostichthys brachygnathus J. E. Randall & R. F. Myers, 1993 (short-jaw soldierfish)
- Ostichthys convexus D. W. Greenfield, J. E. Randall & Psomadakis, 2017 (round-head soldierfish)
- Ostichthys daniela D. W. Greenfield, J. E. Randall & Psomadakis, 2017 (Daniela's soldierfish)
- Ostichthys delta J. E. Randall, Shimizu & Yamakawa, 1982 (red-coat soldierfish)
- Ostichthys hypsipterygion J. E. Randall, Shimizu & Yamakawa, 1982 (high-fin soldierfish)
- Ostichthys hypsufensis Golani, 1984 (Red Sea soldierfish)
- Ostichthys japonicus (G. Cuvier, 1829) (Japanese soldierfish)
- Ostichthys kaianus (Günther, 1880) (deep-water soldierfish)
- Ostichthys kinchi R. Fricke, 2017 (New Ireland soldierfish)
- Ostichthys ovaloculus J. E. Randall & Wrobel, 1988 (oval-eye soldierfish)
- Ostichthys sandix J. E. Randall, Shimizu & Yamakawa, 1982 (vermilion soldierfish)
- Ostichthys sheni J. P. Chen, K. T. Shao & H. K. Mok, 1990 (Shen's soldierfish)
- Ostichthys spiniger Fricke, 2017 (western pacific spinysnout soldierfish)
- Ostichthys trachypoma (Günther, 1859) (big-eye soldierfish)
