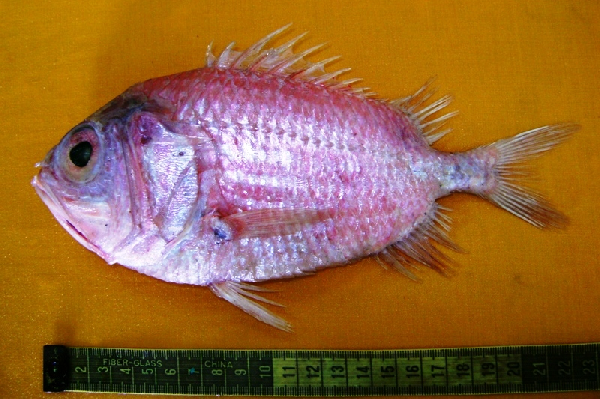

Scientific classification
- Kingdom: Animalia
- Phylum: Chordata
- Class: Actinopterygii
- Order: Beryciformes
- Family: Holocentridae
- Genus: Ostichthys
- Species: O. acanthorhinus

Binomial name
- Ostichthys acanthorhinus Randall, Shimizu & Yamakawa, 1982

= Ostichthys acanthorhinus =

Species of soldierfish

Ostichthys acanthorhinus, the spinesnout soldierfish, is a species of soldierfish belonging to the family Holocentridae.

== Description ==
The spinesnout (alternatively spelled spinysnout) soldierfish has a maximum length of 11.2 centimetres (4.4 in). The anterior ends of each of its nasal bones have a sharp, forward-directed spine. A spine is also present at the corner of its preoperculum. The dorsal part of its head is uniformly convex. The colour of the spinesnout soldierfish is entirely red, lacking any white markings.

== Distribution ==
The spinesnout soldierfish is found in the Indo-Pacific region from Arabian Sea through Myanmar in the northern Indian Ocean, including the Red Sea. It is also present in areas spanning from Indonesia to the northern coast of Australia.

== Habitat and biology ==
It is usually found on the continental shelf and continental slope. It resides at depths ranging 200 m – 600 m (656 ft – 1969 ft), and inhabits reefs.
