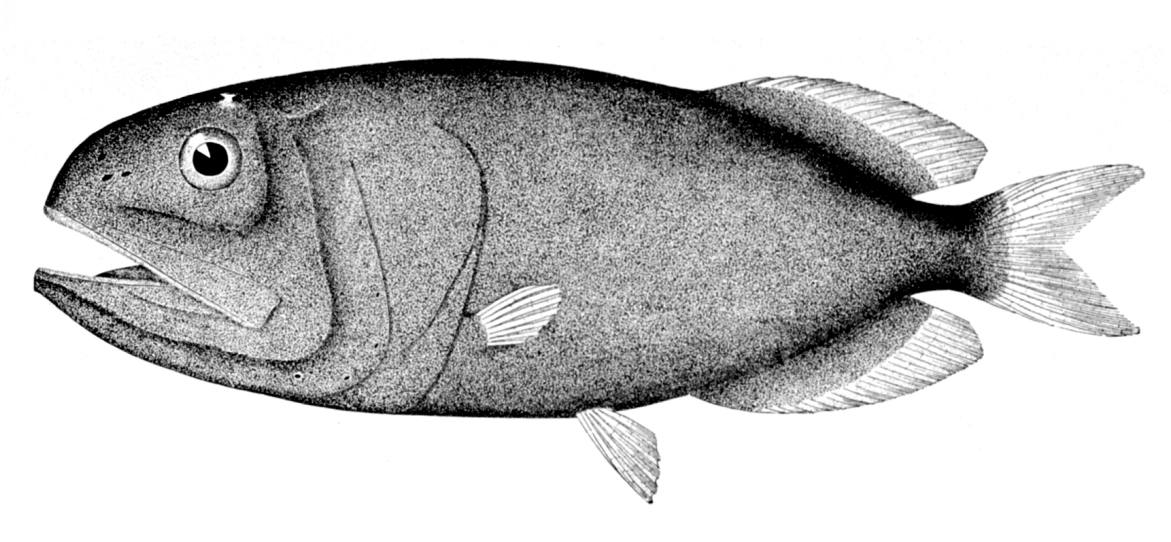

Conservation status
- Least Concern (IUCN 3.1)

Scientific classification
- Kingdom: Animalia
- Phylum: Chordata
- Class: Actinopterygii
- Order: Beryciformes
- Family: Rondeletiidae
- Genus: Rondeletia
- Species: R. bicolor

Binomial name
- Rondeletia bicolor Goode & Bean, 1895

= Rondeletia bicolor =

Species of fish

Rondeletia bicolor is a species of redmouth whalefish known only from the western Atlantic Ocean, where it is found at depths of around 3,003 m (9,852 ft). This species grows to a length of 11.2 cm (4.4 in).
