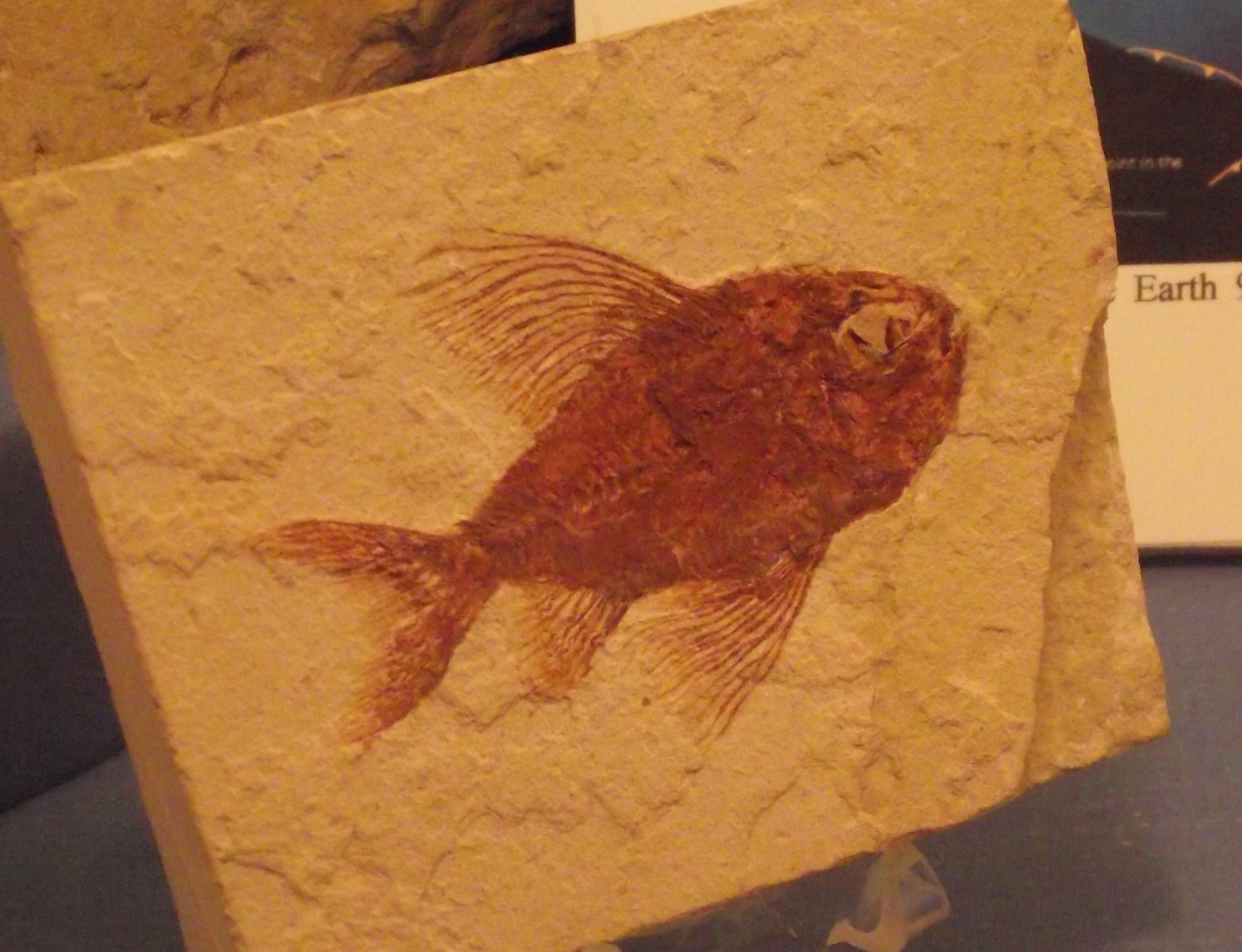
- Pseudoberyx syriacus

Scientific classification
- Domain: Eukaryota
- Kingdom: Animalia
- Phylum: Chordata
- Class: Actinopterygii
- Order: Beryciformes
- Genus: †Pseudoberyx; Pictet and Humbert, 1866

= Pseudoberyx =

Pseudoberyx Temporal range: Cenomanian

Extinct genus of fishes

Pseudoberyx is an extinct genus of prehistoric bony fish that lived during the Cenomanian.

== See also ==
- Prehistoric fish
- List of prehistoric bony fish
