= Leucobrotula =

Conservation status
- Data Deficient (IUCN 3.1)

Scientific classification
- Kingdom: Animalia
- Phylum: Chordata
- Class: Actinopterygii
- Division: Teleostei
- Order: Ophidiiformes
- Suborder: Bythitoidei
- Family: Parabrotulidae
- Genus: Leucobrotula
- Species: L. adipata

Binomial name
- Leucobrotula adipata Koefoed, 1952

Synonyms
- Leucobrotula adipatus (lapsus)

Species of fish

Leucobrotula adipata is a species of false brotula found in the northeastern Atlantic Ocean. This species grows to a length of 4.5 centimetres (1.8 in) NG. This species is the only known member of its genus.
