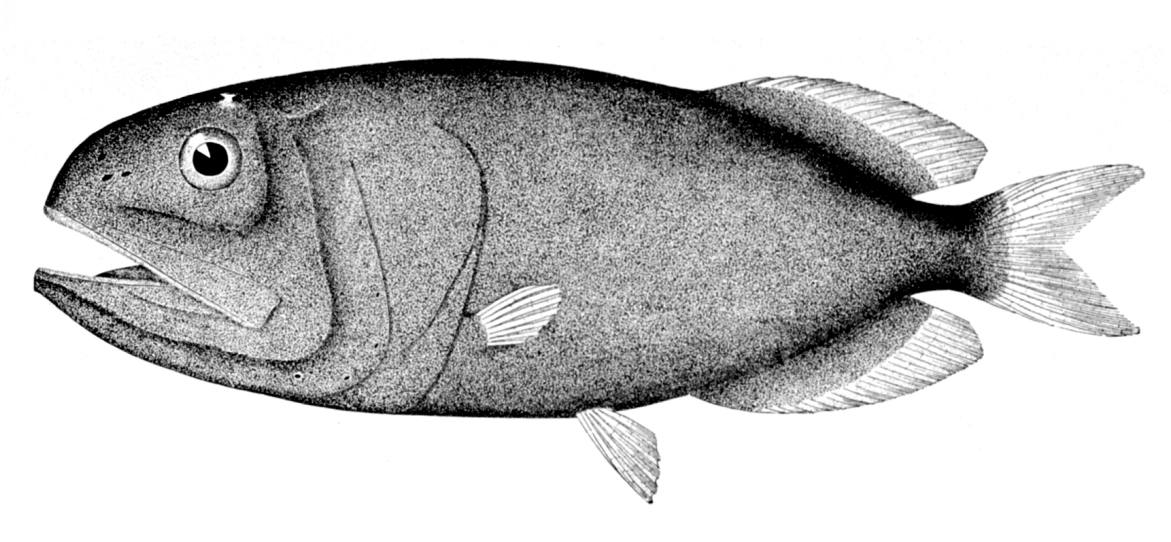
- Rondeletia bicolor

Scientific classification
- Domain: Eukaryota
- Kingdom: Animalia
- Phylum: Chordata
- Class: Actinopterygii
- Order: Beryciformes
- Suborder: Stephanoberycoidei
- Family: Rondeletiidae; Goode & T.H. Bean, 1895
- Genus: Rondeletia; Goode & T.H. Bean, 1895

= Redmouth whalefish =

Genus of ray-finned fishes

The redmouth whalefishes are two species of deep-sea whalefishes in the genus Rondeletia, the only genus in the family Rondeletiidae. They are apparently close to the velvet whalefish (Barbourisia rufa), and apparently also to the gibberfishes (Gibberichthyidae). The latter and the Rondeletiidae are the only known living fishes which have the mysterious Tominaga's organ.

Like the plant genus of the same name, this genus is named after Guillaume Rondelet.

Redmouth whalefishes are small fishes. Rondeletia bicolor grows to about 6 cm long or so. It is most commonly found in the northern Atlantic, but has been documented from the eastern Pacific, as well, and presumably also occurs in the rest of the Atlantic. The better-known Rondeletia loricata is known from all oceans between 47°N–47°S; it has been recorded to reach a length of more than 9 cm when adult.

Usually found in deep waters of tropical and temperate oceans around the world, down to 3,000 m or more, they make migrations up to shallower waters (around 100 m) at night to feed on crustaceans and amphipods. The larvae occur in the surface waters, down to 50 m; previous to the onset of metamorphosis, they can be found in the uppermost few meters, descending as they mature. Notochord flexion occurs at around 4 mm standard length in R. loricata.

== Species ==
The currently recognized species in this genus are:

- Rondeletia bicolor (Goode & Bean, 1895)
- Rondeletia loricata (T. Abe & Hotta, 1963)
