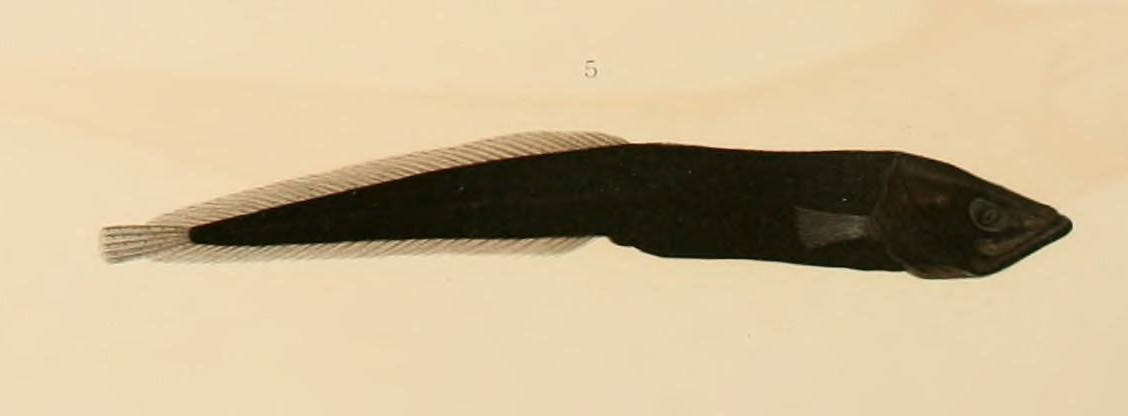
- False Cusk (P. plagiophthalmus)

Scientific classification
- Kingdom: Animalia
- Phylum: Chordata
- Class: Actinopterygii
- Order: Ophidiiformes
- Suborder: Bythitoidei
- Family: Parabrotulidae
- Genus: Parabrotula; Zugmayer, 1911

Type species
- Parabrotula plagiophthalmus Zugmayer, 1911

= Parabrotula =

Genus of fishes

Parabrotula is a genus of false brotulas.

== Species ==
There are currently two recognized species in this genus:

- Parabrotula plagiophthalma Zugmayer, 1911 (False cusk)
- Parabrotula tanseimaru Miya & J. G. Nielsen, 1991

== Size ==
Max length : 5.4 cm

== Environment ==
Parabrotula live in deep marine climate water at a depth ranging from 0 – 3000 meters.

== Distribution ==
Most of the known species of Parabrotula are located in the Northeast Atlantic area. One specimen was found in the Eastern Atlantic Gulf of Guinea. Parabrotula were also said to have been found in the Southeast Atlantic off East London, South Africa.

== Short description ==
Parabrotula have between 37-41 dorsal soft rays and 34-38 anal soft rays. This species had a long, naked, compressed body with loose skin. Their skin is thin but not gelatinous. They also have a pointed snout with a large gill opening and their head and body are usually dark brown.
