= Coiidae =

Invalid family of ray-finned fishes

The Coiidae is an invalid family of fish supposedly related to the Lobotidae and the Datnioides (such as Datnioides microlepis). Their taxonomic position is disputed; they were once considered synonymous with the latter, and may be the same as Anabas.

== See also ==
- List of fish families
