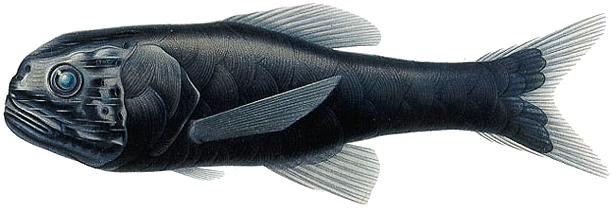
- Scopelogadus mizolepis mizolepis, a ridgehead

Scientific classification
- Kingdom: Animalia
- Phylum: Chordata
- Class: Actinopterygii
- Order: Beryciformes
- Suborder: Stephanoberycoidei

Type species
- Stephanoberyx monae T. N. Gill, 1883

Families
- Barbourisiidae; Cetomimidae; Gibberichthyidae; Hispidoberycidae; Melamphaidae; Rondeletiidae; Stephanoberycidae

Synonyms
- Cetomimiformes

= Stephanoberycoidei =

Stephanoberycoidei Temporal range: Early Eocene to present

Order of ray-finned fishes

The Stephanoberycoidei is a suborder of marine ray-finned fishes, consisting of about 68 species, the majority (61) of which belong to the ridgehead family (Melamphaidae). They were formerly placed as their own order, the Stephanoberyciformes. However, more recent taxonomic sources treat them as a suborder of the Beryciformes.

The Stephanoberyciformes are mostly uncommon deep-sea species with little, if any, importance to commercial fishery. They share many morphological similarities with the Berycoidei, their sister order. They are usually found in Australian waters. The whalefishes, which were formerly treated as their own order, are now also placed in this group. Some families treat them as a superfamily within the group named Cetomimoidea; most taxa traditionally placed here would then be the Stephanoberycoidea.

The families are:

- Family Stephanoberycidae Gill, 1884 (pricklefishes)
- Family Hispidoberycidae Kotlyar, 1981 (spiny-scale pricklefishes)
- Family Gibberichthyidae Parr, 1933 (gibberfishes)
- Family Rondeletiidae Goode & Bean, 1895 (redmouth whalefishes)
- Family Barbourisiidae Parr, 1945 (redvelvet whalefishes)
- Family Cetomimidae Goode & Bean, 1895 (whalefishes or flabby whalefishes)

Common characteristics include; a generally rounded body, a toothless palate, rather thin skull bones, and a missing orbitosphenoid bone (except for Hispidoberyx).

The gibberfishes on the other hand appear to be closer to whalefishes such as Rondeletia, as has been proposed time and again. These two groups have - apparently as only living fishes - the mysterious Tominaga's organ (A large mass of globular white tissue, that is present anterior to the orbit and posterior and medial to the nostrils and nasal rosette). Rondeletia, meanwhile, is suspected to be very close to the velvet whalefish, Barbourisia rufa.

Despite their distinctive appearance, this clade is only thought to have diverged from the Berycoidei during the Paleocene. Potentially the earliest fossil record of the group is of a Rondeletia-like whalefish from the earliest Eocene-aged Fur Formation of Denmark.
