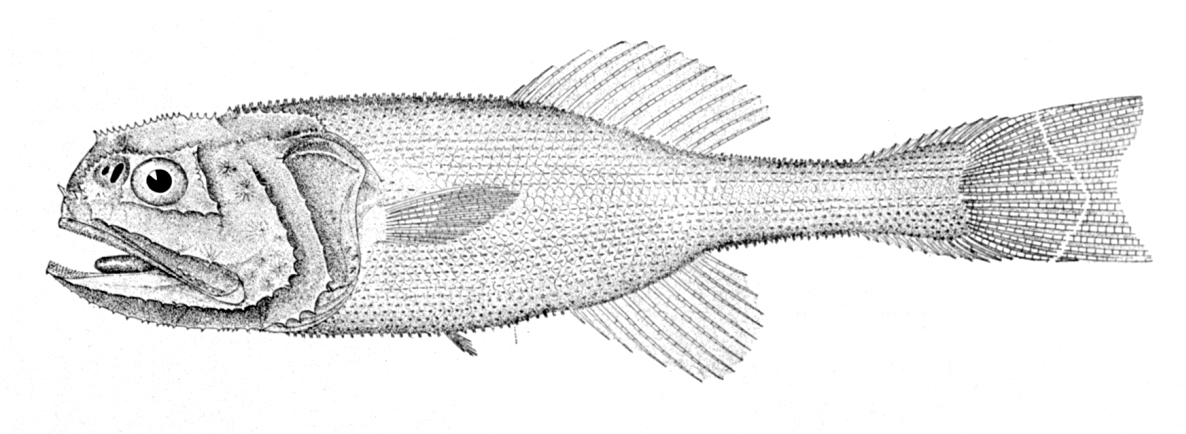

Conservation status
- Least Concern (IUCN 3.1)

Scientific classification
- Kingdom: Animalia
- Phylum: Chordata
- Class: Actinopterygii
- Order: Beryciformes
- Family: Stephanoberycidae
- Genus: Stephanoberyx; T. N. Gill, 1883
- Species: S. monae

Binomial name
- Stephanoberyx monae T. N. Gill, 1883

= Stephanoberyx =

Species of fish

Stephanoberyx monae is a species of pricklefish found in the western Atlantic Ocean at depths of from 945 to 4,777 metres (3,100 to 15,670 ft). This species grows to a length of 8.1 centimetres (3.2 in). This species is the only known member of the genus Stephanoberyx.
