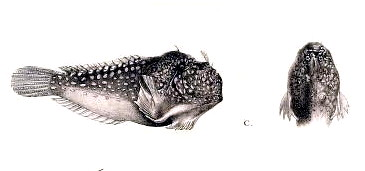
- Tetrabrachium ocellatum

Scientific classification
- Kingdom: Animalia
- Phylum: Chordata
- Class: Actinopterygii
- Order: Lophiiformes
- Family: Antennariidae
- Subfamily: Tetrabrachiinae; Regan, 1912

Genera
- see text

= Tetrabrachiinae =

Family of fishes

Tetrabrachiinae, or the four-armed frogfishes or doublefin frogfishes, is a small subfamily of marine ray-finned fishes belonging to the family Antennariidae in the order Lophiiformes, the anglerfishes. These fishes are found in relatively shallow waters of the eastern Indian Ocean and western Pacific Ocean.

== Taxonomy ==
Tetrabrachiidae was first proposed as a subfamily, the Tetrabrachiinae, of the family Antennariidae in 1912 by the English ichthyologist Charles Tate Regan with only a single genus included, Tetrabrachium, a monospecific genus which had been proposed by Albert Günther in 1880. In 2009 a second monospecific genus, Dibrachichthys, was added to the family when it was described by Theodore Wells Pietsch III, Jeffery W. Johnson and Rachel J. Arnold. Although upgraded to its own family previously, it was again subsumed to a subfamily of the Antennariidae in 2025. The Tetrabrachiidae is classified within the suborder Antennarioidei within the order Lophiiformes, the anglerfishes. This family is regarded, with its sister taxon the Antennariidae, as the most derived clade within the suborder Antennarioidei.

== Etymology ==
Tetrabrachiinae is derived from its type genus Tetrabrachium, which means "four armed", a reference to the pectoral fins having their upper parts separate, giving the impression of there being two pectoral fins on either side of the body.

== Genera ==
Tetrabrachiinae contains the following two monospecific genera:

- Dibrachichthys Pietsch, J. W. Johnson & Arnold, 2009
- Tetrabrachium Günther, 1880

== Characteristics ==
Tetrabrachiinae frogfishes have an elongate and strongly compressed body with a small mouth and a convex nape. They have no swimbladder. The soft dorsal fin is supported by 16 or 17 soft rays while the anal fin is supported by 11 soft rays. There are no teeth on the palatine. The small, closely set eyes are set high on the head and protrude above the dorsal profile. The illicium, or fishing rod, has no esca, or lure. It was thought that the pectoral fin being divided was a characteristic of the family but Dibrachichthys has undivided pectoral fins. Four-armed frogfishes are small fishes, the largest species is Tetrabrachium ocellatum which has a maximum published standard length of 7 cm (2.8 in).

== Distribution and habitat ==
Tetrabrachiinae frogfishes are found in the western Pacific and eastern Indian Oceans around northern Australia, New Guinea and Indonesia. These fishes occur in areas of soft substrate in inshore waters and the continental shelf.
