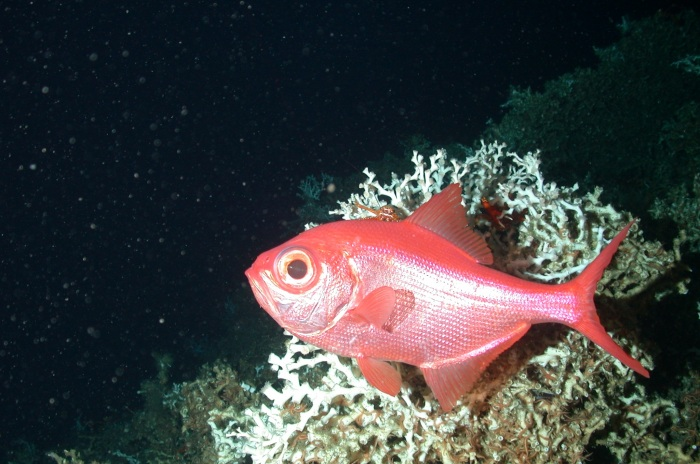

Conservation status
- Least Concern (IUCN 3.1)

Scientific classification
- Kingdom: Animalia
- Phylum: Chordata
- Class: Actinopterygii
- Order: Beryciformes
- Family: Berycidae
- Genus: Beryx
- Species: B. decadactylus

Binomial name
- Beryx decadactylus (G. Cuvier, 1829)

= Alfonsino =

Species of fish

The alfonsino (Beryx decadactylus), also known as the alfonsin, longfinned beryx, red bream, or imperador, is a species of deepwater berycid fish of the order Beryciformes. It can be found in temperate and subtropical ocean waters nearly worldwide, though it is uncommon. It is typically associated with deep-sea corals, and schools are known to form over seamounts. Adults are demersal and search for prey along the ocean floor, primarily fish, cephalopods, and crustaceans. Like other members of its family, it is remarkably long-lived, with individuals reaching ages of up to 69 years, and possibly longer. It can reach sizes of up to 1 m (3.3 ft) in length and 2.5 kg (5.5 lb) in weight and is targeted by commercial fisheries. Its low reproductive rate and the time it takes for juveniles to mature make it vulnerable to expanding deep-sea fisheries, but it is listed as Least Concern by the International Union for Conservation of Nature (IUCN) due to its extensive range.

== Taxonomy and phylogeny ==
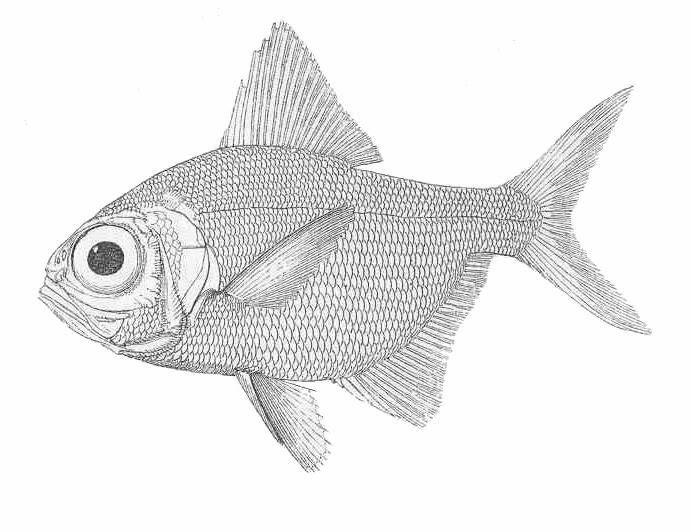
1880 drawing of the alfonsino

The first scientific description of the alfonsino was authored in 1829 by Georges Cuvier in the third volume of his 22-volume ichthyology collection, Histoire Naturelle des Poissons, who gave it the name Beryx dodecadactylus. It was renamed B. decadactylus by ichthyologist G. E. Maul in 1990. The etymology of its generic name is unclear, but it likely comes from the Greek name for a fish, but which species it was originally used for remains unknown. It is possible that Beryx originally described a species of parrotfish, or did not describe a fish at all.

== Description ==
The alfonsino has large eyes and a deep, compressed body, 1.9–2.5 times its standard length at the greatest depth. It is a rose red color dorsally and orange ventrally. The rest of its body is silvery-pink, and the breast is yellow-white in color. Fins and the inside of the mouth are bright red. The anal fin is distinctly larger than in many fish species and its caudal fin is deeply forked. Its bright red color is a common adaptation to deepwater surroundings, where red is filtered out of the light spectrum. Although the most common size is 35.0 cm (13.8 in), it can reach lengths of up to 100.0 cm (39.4 in) TL. The maximum published weight for an alfonsino is 2.5 kg (5.5 lb). Juveniles have heavy head spines, while adults do not.

== Distribution and habitat ==
The alfonsino is found worldwide in subtropical and temperate waters, with a latitudinal range extending from 70°N to 48°S. It is found from as far north as Greenland and Iceland south to Brazil in the western Atlantic and South Africa in the eastern Atlantic. In the Indo-Pacific it is found from South Africa east to Japan, Australia, and New Zealand. It has also been reported off the coasts of Argentina and Hawaii. It is likely more common in the western Pacific than records indicate due to lack of fishing in its depth range in the region.

With an extensive depth range 110–1,000 m (360–3,280 ft) below the surface, the alfonsino occurs in localized aggregations over deep-sea coral habitats on the continental shelf and continental slope. By day it stays in deeper water and vertically migrates to shallower waters at night. It is most commonly found 200–400 m (660–1,310 ft) deep in waters around 24 °C (75 °F) in temperature, however depth range varies by region. In the eastern Atlantic its depth range is 350–600 m (1,150–1,970 ft), while in the western Atlantic its depth range is 100–972 m (328–3,189 ft), common depth range 400–600 m (1,300–2,000 ft). Its depth range is largest in the Indo-Pacific, where it is found as deep as 1,000 m (3,300 ft) in the waters off of Australia, New Zealand, New Caledonia, La Reunion Island, Mauritius, Madagascar, Comoros, Seychelles, Korea, Japan, New Guinea, the Ryukyu Islands, and Hawaii.

== Biology and ecology ==
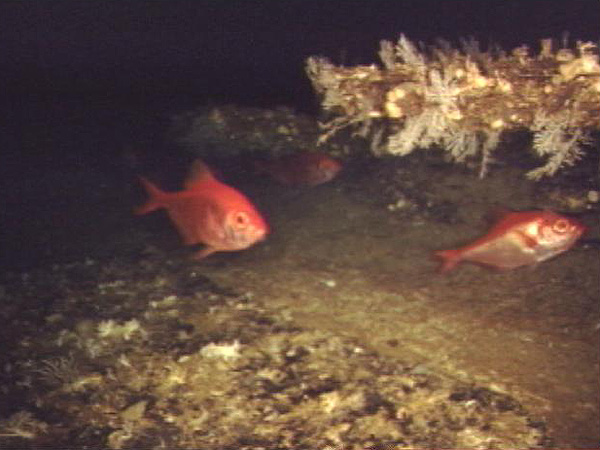
Alfonsinos hunt for prey along the ocean floor.

The splendid alfonsino is the far more studied species of Beryx, but the alfonsino's biology is very similar to that of its congener. Alfonsinos are benthopelagic and aggregate over deep-ocean seamounts, typically near deep-sea corals. At night, they migrate vertically into shallower waters. Their primary food sources are crustaceans, cephalopods, and small fish, with the last being the most abundant prey in its diet. In this it is quite dissimilar from the splendid alfonsino, which appears to have a slower digestion and wider dietary breadth.

Spawning occurs in the summer months, June through September, though males can reproduce year-round. Alfonsinos are batch spawners, that is they release eggs multiple times over an extended spawning season rather in a short period. Eggs and larvae are epipelagic, staying near the ocean's surface. Eggs hatch after around 27 hours and larvae are initially 1.5–3.0 mm (0.059–0.118 in) SL in size, identifiable by pigment near the brain. Flexion, when the larva bends upwards prior to development of the caudal fin, occurs at 3.7–6.0 mm (0.15–0.24 in) SL. Fin rays and scales are fully formed by 15 mm (0.59 in) SL. They are distinguished by elongated pelvic rays and anterior dorsal spines as well as pigment near the gas bladder, though they are very similar to the larvae of the splendid alfonsino. Juveniles live deeper, but are still pelagic for a few months, eventually moving to their demersal habitat where they will live as adults. After 4 years, they reach sexual maturity, at which point they will be about 30 cm (12 in) in size, with females being slightly larger on average than males. Individuals grow slowly, as is common among members of Berycidae. Although their maximum age is unknown, individuals have been caught at 69 years old. Their actual maximum age is unknown, however, with estimates ranging as high as 85 years.

== Human interaction ==
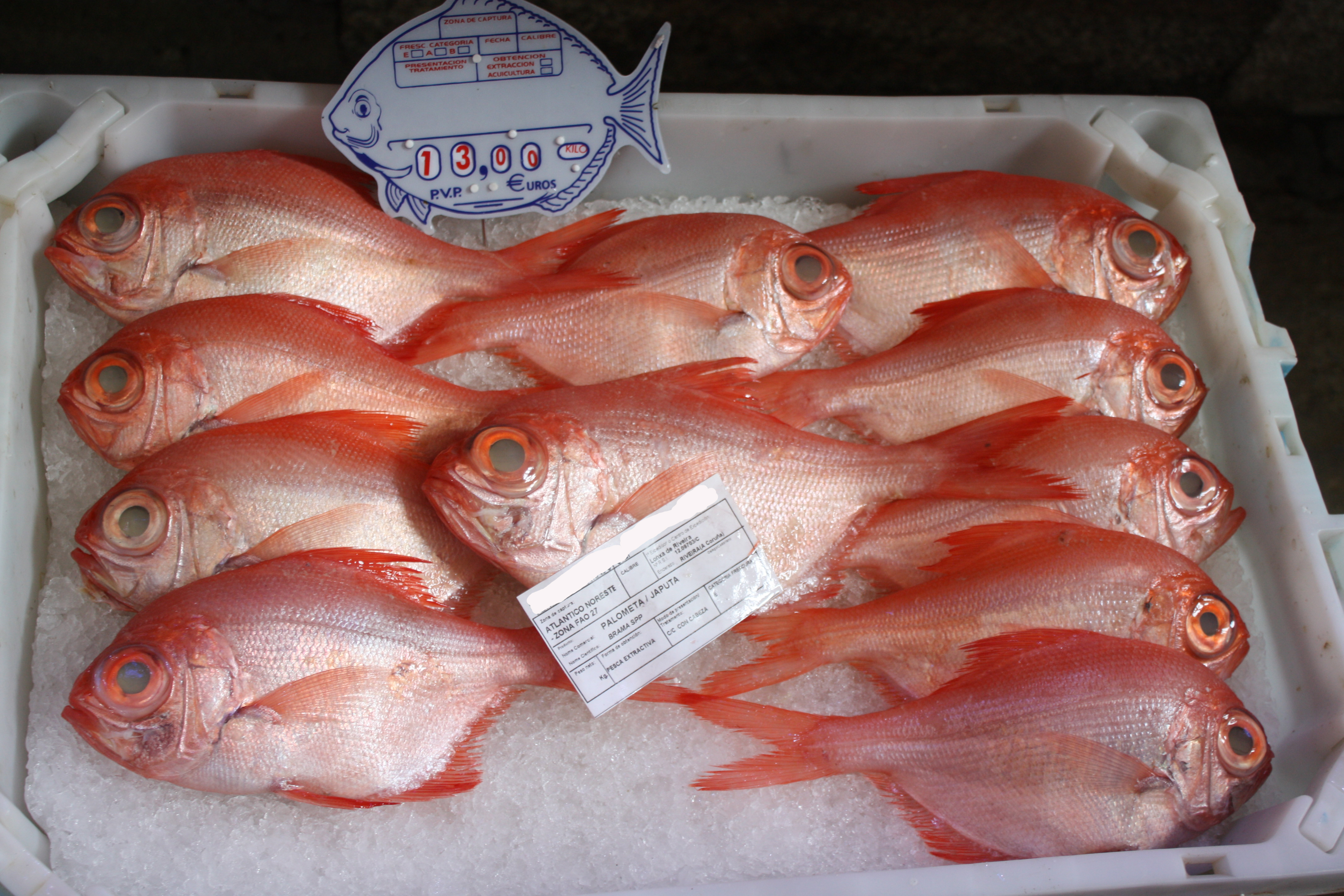
Alfonsinos for sale

Alfonsinos are economically important fish, targeted by commercial fisheries, including seamount fisheries, that employ deep-water trawling and longline fishing methods to catch them. It is of import to fisheries in Spain, the Canary Islands and Mauritania in the eastern Atlantic; the southeastern United States in the western Atlantic; and Japan and Réunion in the Indo-Pacific. It is also captured as bycatch of fisheries targeting the splendid alfonsino, though capture data likely does not distinguish between the two. This has led to concerns that stocks may be more depleted than previously thought. Of all Beryx species, the splendid alfonsino is the most commonly caught, but B. decadactylus makes up 95% of all Beryx catches off the southeastern United States.

Despite being widespread throughout its range, the alfonsino is an uncommon fish in many areas, likely due to exploitation by commercial fisheries and depletion due to bycatch. It is listed as Least Concern by the International Union for Conservation of Nature (IUCN) because its extensive distribution protects it from danger of extinction and in parts of its range it is not a targeted species. It could also be threatened by habitat loss due to deep-water trawling causing damage to deep-sea corals.
