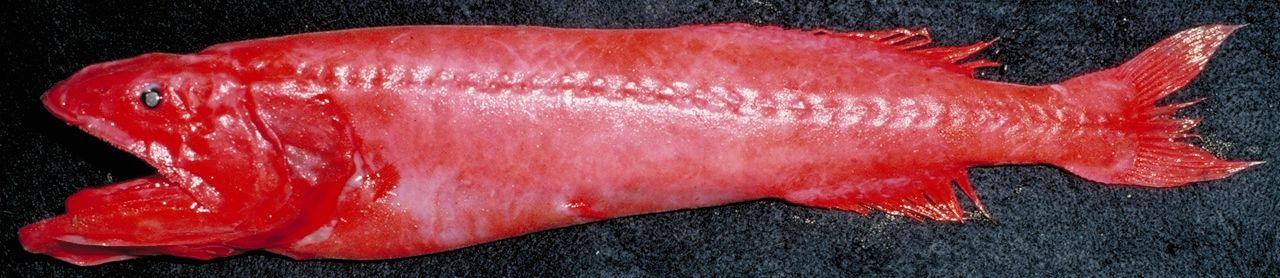

Conservation status
- Least Concern (IUCN 3.1)

Scientific classification
- Kingdom: Animalia
- Phylum: Chordata
- Class: Actinopterygii
- Order: Beryciformes
- Suborder: Stephanoberycoidei
- Family: Barbourisiidae; A.E. Parr, 1945
- Genus: Barbourisia; A.E. Parr, 1945
- Species: B. rufa

Binomial name
- Barbourisia rufa A.E. Parr, 1945

Synonyms
- Family-level: Barbourisidae A.E. Parr, 1945 (lapsus)

= Velvet whalefish =

Velvet whalefish Temporal range: Middle Miocene–present

Species of fish

The velvet whalefish (Barbourisia rufa) is a deep-sea whalefish, the sole known member of its family Barbourisiidae. It is found throughout the tropical and temperate parts of the world's oceans, mainly in the Pacific near Japan and New Zealand, at depths of 300–2,000 m. This species seems very closely related to some flabby whalefish and it was initially believed to belong to that family by some. They have been found from 65°N–40°S in the Atlantic, 50°N–50°S in the Pacific, and 5–20°S in the Indian Ocean.

Like other whalefish, it has a generally whale-shaped body, small pectoral and pelvic fins, and dorsal and anal fins set far back. Body and fins are covered with tiny spicules, resulting in a velvety feel that inspires the name. Colour is an overall vivid geranium red or dark orange. The mouth is large, extending well behind the eyes, has a white interior, and the lower jaw projects beyond the upper jaw. The largest recorded specimen was 34.5 cm; another fairly large specimen weighed 456 g.

Little is known of their habits, but they are believed to feed on crustaceans. The larvae metamorphose into the adult form at about 7 mm standard length. Larvae and immatures inhabit the upper water layers, down to some dozen metres; larvae before notochord flexion/metamorphosis in particular can sometimes be found right at the surface. As opposed to adults, they still have a small swim bladder.

Young whalefish make nightly vertical migrations into the lower mesopelagic zone to feed on copepods. When males make the transition to adults, they develop a massive liver, and then their jaws fuse shut. They no longer eat, but continue to metabolise the energy stored in their liver.

An extinct relative, Miobarbourisia Fujii, Uyeno & Shimaguchi, 2007 is known from the Middle Miocene of Japan. Some recent studies suggest that Barbourisia is paraphyletic with respect to other whalefishes, and may rather be more closely related to (and placed within) the Stephanoberycidae.
