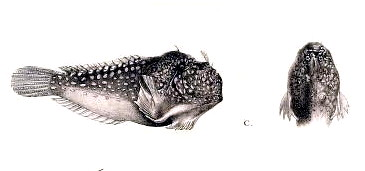

Conservation status
- Least Concern (IUCN 3.1)

Scientific classification
- Kingdom: Animalia
- Phylum: Chordata
- Class: Actinopterygii
- Division: Teleostei
- Order: Lophiiformes
- Family: Antennariidae
- Subfamily: Tetrabrachiinae
- Genus: Tetrabrachium; Günther, 1880
- Species: T. ocellatum

Binomial name
- Tetrabrachium ocellatum Günther, 1880

= Tetrabrachium =

Four-armed frogfish

Genus of fishes

Tetrabrachium ocellatum (four-armed frogfish) is a species of anglerfish, closely related to the true frogfishes. It is the only member of its genus.

Like the true frogfishes, it is a small fish, no more than 7 centimetres (2.8 in) in length, with a flattened body and loose skin. It has prehensile pectoral fins, helping it to move along the seabed, and giving it its "four-armed" appearance. It lives in shallow waters, around 50 metres (160 ft) depth, off the coasts of New Guinea, Indonesia, and Australia.
