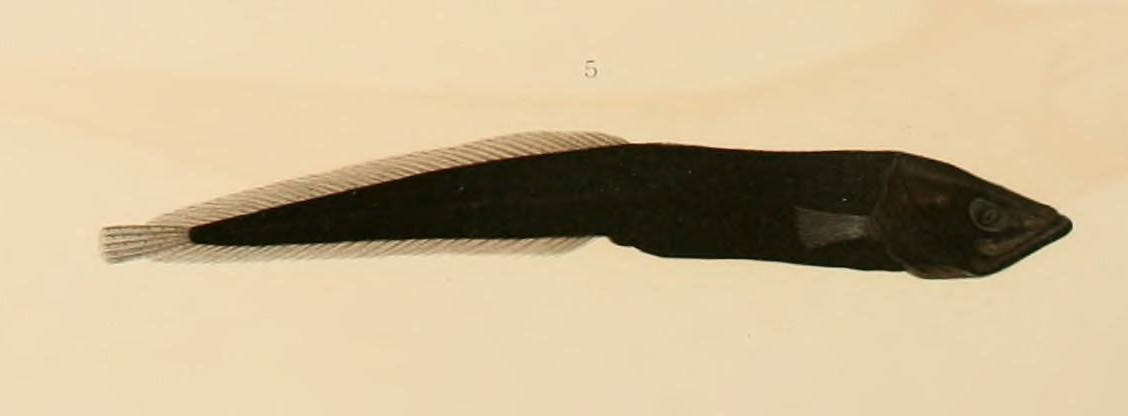
- False Cusk (Parabrotula plagiophthalmus)

Scientific classification
- Domain: Eukaryota
- Kingdom: Animalia
- Phylum: Chordata
- Class: Actinopterygii
- Order: Ophidiiformes
- Suborder: Bythitoidei
- Family: Parabrotulidae; Nielsen, 1968

Genera
- Leucobrotula; Parabrotula

= Parabrotulidae =

Family of fishes

The Parabrotulidae, the false brotulas, are a small family of bathypelagic cusk eels that currently contains two genera. The species in this family are known from the northwest Pacific Ocean and the northeast Atlantic Ocean. Small fishes of less than 6 cm (2.4 in), they are not of any economic importance.
