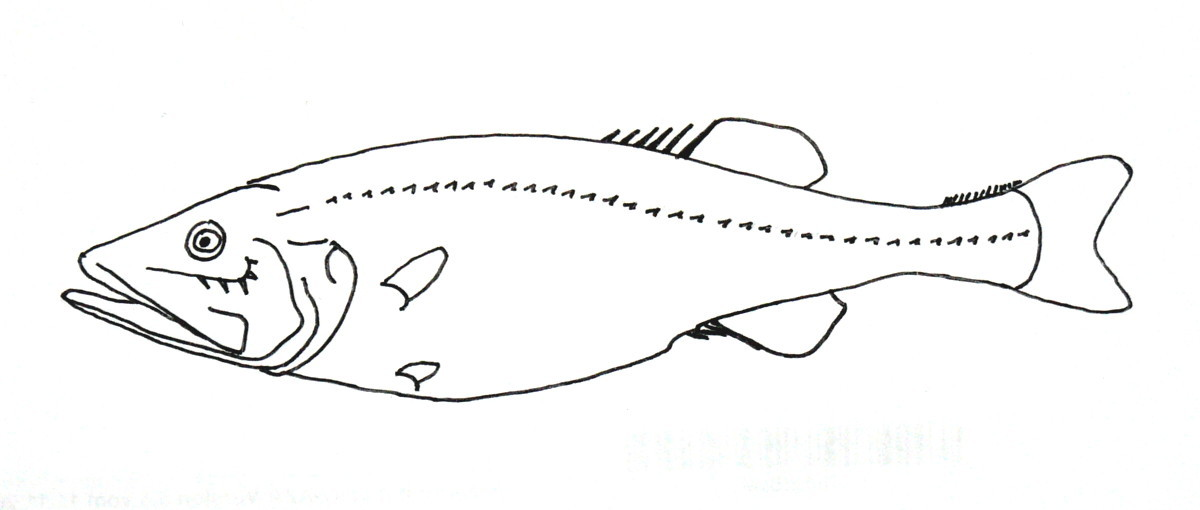
- H. ambigiosus

Conservation status
- Least Concern (IUCN 3.1)

Scientific classification
- Kingdom: Animalia
- Phylum: Chordata
- Class: Actinopterygii
- Order: Beryciformes
- Suborder: Stephanoberycoidei
- Family: Hispidoberycidae; Kotlyar, 1981
- Genus: Hispidoberyx; Kotlyar, 1981
- Species: H. ambagiosus

Binomial name
- Hispidoberyx ambagiosus Kotlyar, 1981

= Hispidoberyx =

Species of fish

Hispidoberyx ambagiosus, the bristlyskin, is a species of spiny-scale pricklefish found in the Indian and Pacific Oceans at depths from 560 to 1,019 m (1,837 to 3,343 ft). This species grows to 18.1 cm (7.1 in) standard length. This species is the only known member of its family.
