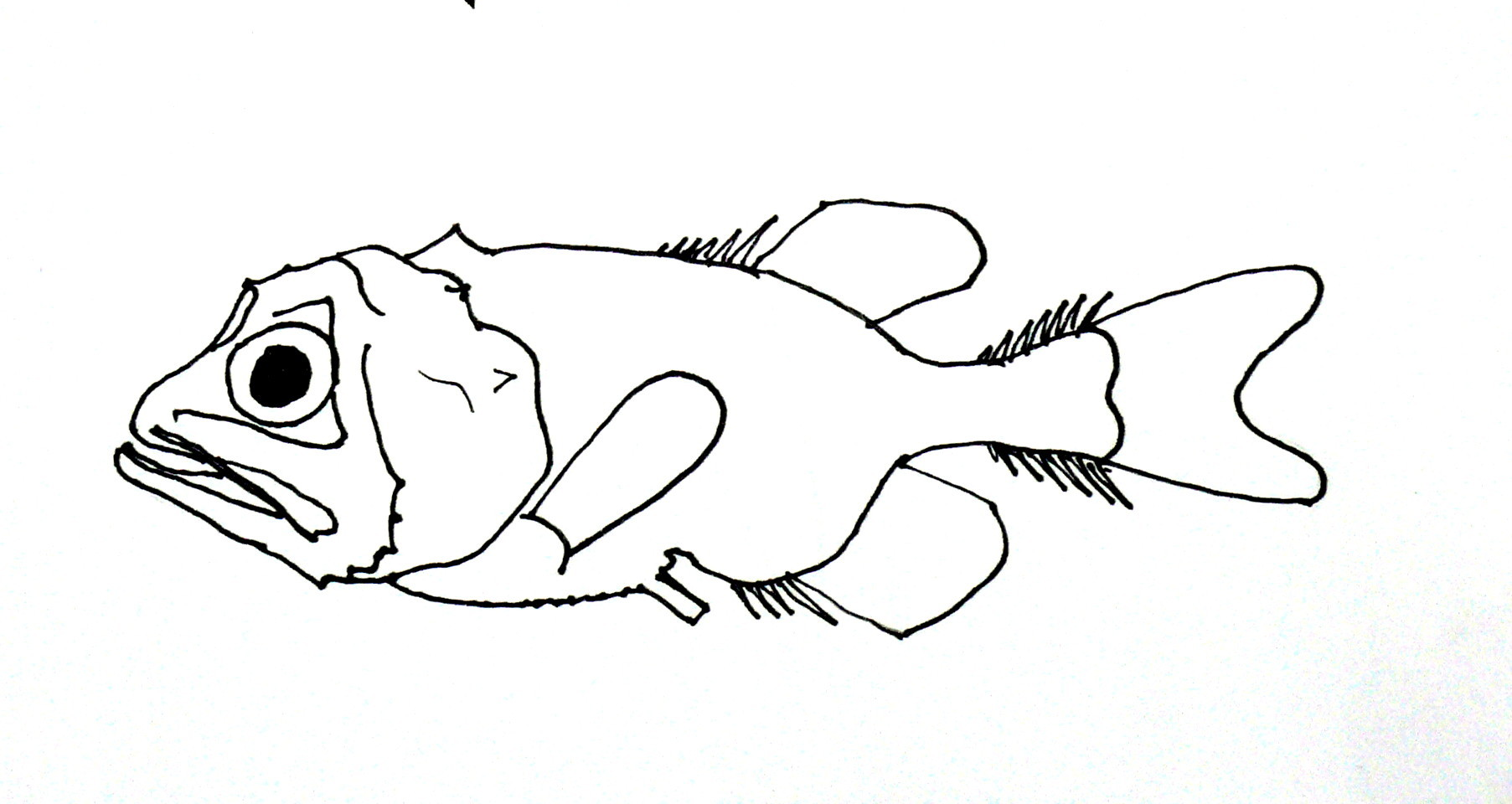
- G. pumilus

Scientific classification
- Kingdom: Animalia
- Phylum: Chordata
- Class: Actinopterygii
- Order: Beryciformes
- Suborder: Stephanoberycoidei
- Family: Gibberichthyidae; A. E. Parr, 1933
- Genus: Gibberichthys; A. E. Parr, 1933

= Gibberichthys =

Family of ray-finned fishes

The Gibberichthyidae, also known as gibberfishes, are a small family of deep sea beryciform ray-finned fish, containing a single genus, Gibberichthys (from the Latin gibba, "humpbacked" and the Greek ichthys, "fish"), and two species. Found in the tropical western Atlantic, western Indian, and western and southwestern Pacific Oceans at depths of about 400–1,000 m, gibberfishes are of no economic importance. The maximum recorded size for either species is 12 centimetres (4.7 in) standard length.

== Species ==
There are currently two recognized species in this genus:

- Gibberichthys latifrons (Thorp, 1969)
- Gibberichthys pumilus A. E. Parr, 1933 (Gibberfish) (formerly known as Kasidoron edom Robins & De Sylva, 1965)

== See also ==
- List of fish families

== Other sources ==
- Froese, Rainer; Pauly, Daniel (eds.). "Family Gibberichthyidae". FishBase.

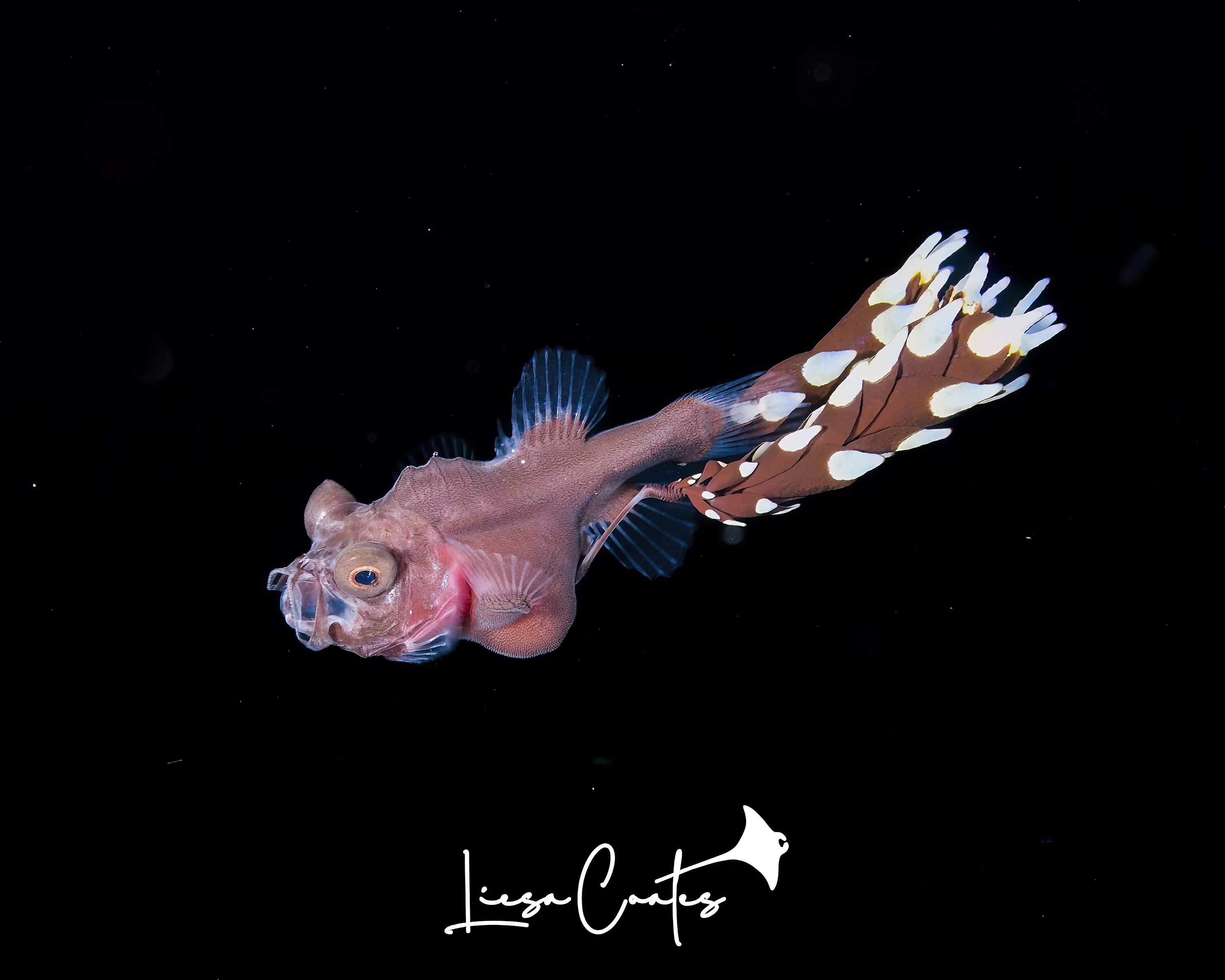
Gibberfish in Cozumel

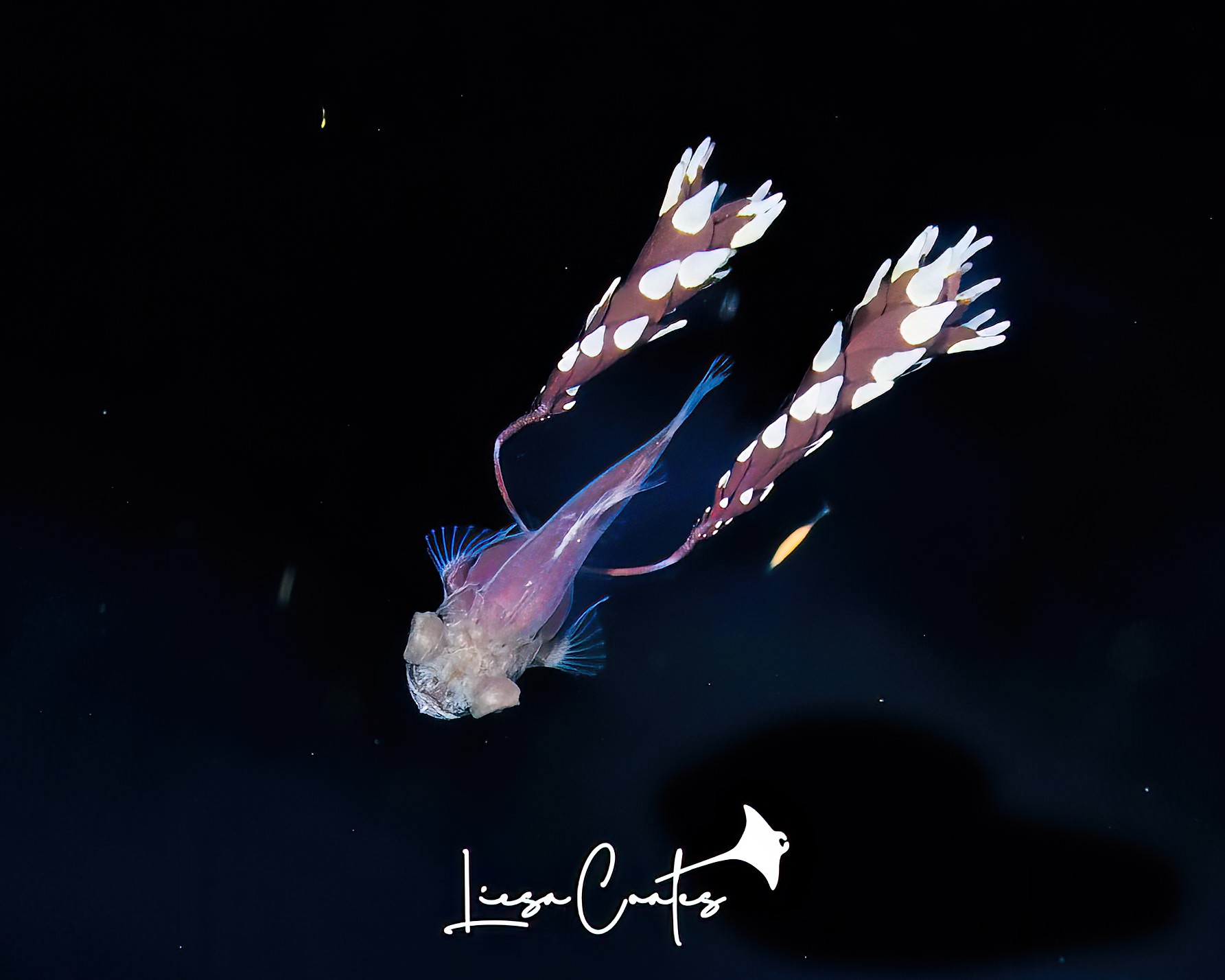
Gibberfish in Cozumel

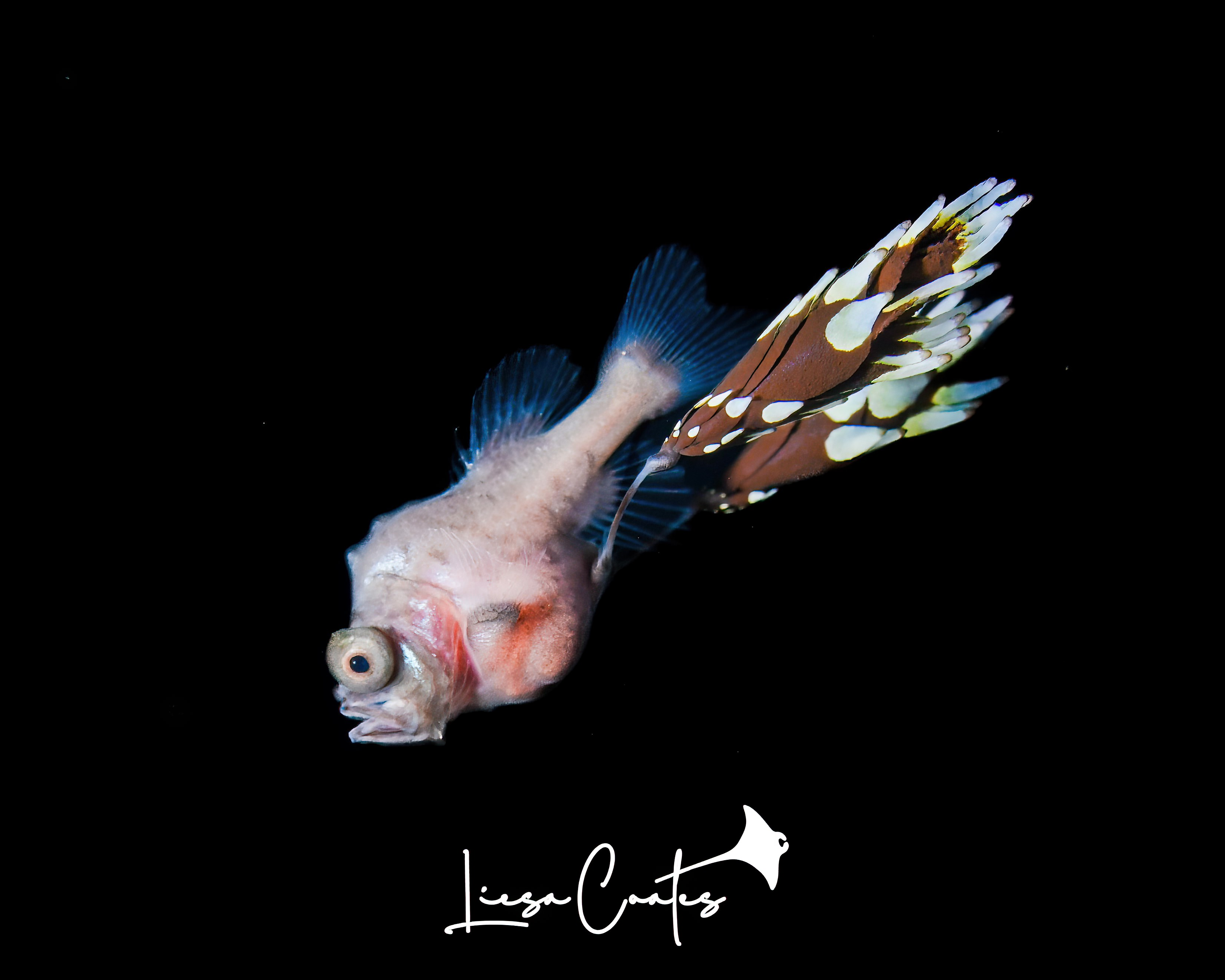
Gibberfish found in Cozumel
