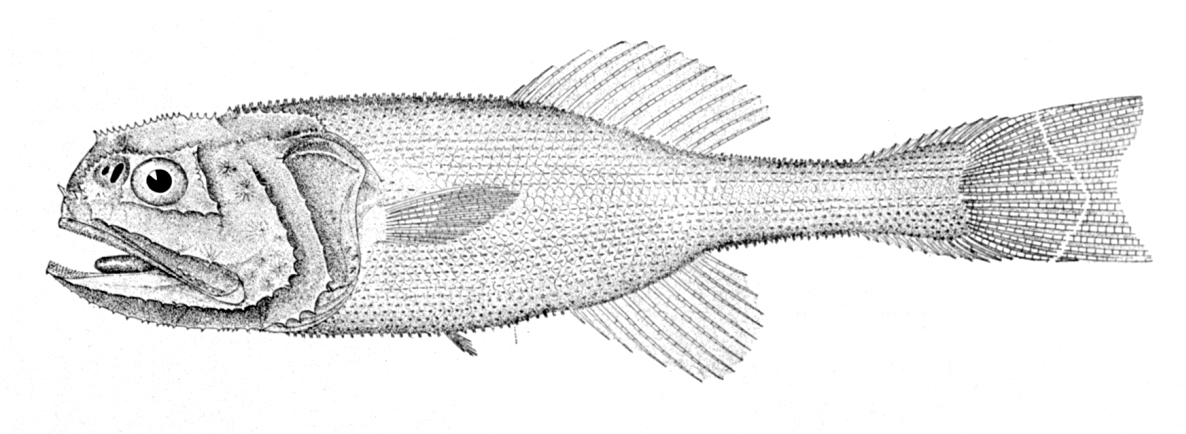
- Stephanoberyx monae

Scientific classification
- Kingdom: Animalia
- Phylum: Chordata
- Class: Actinopterygii
- Order: Beryciformes
- Suborder: Stephanoberycoidei
- Family: Stephanoberycidae; T. N. Gill, 1884

Genera
- Abyssoberyx; Acanthochaenus; Malacosarcus; Stephanoberyx

= Stephanoberycidae =

Pricklefishes

Family of ray-finned fishes

Stephanoberycidae, the pricklefishes are a family of fishes in the order Beryciformes.

They are found in tropical and subtropical waters of the Atlantic and Pacific Oceans, and to the Indian Ocean off the coast of South Africa.

They are deep-water fishes, only living below 1,000 metres (3,300 ft), and have been found down to 5,000 metres (16,000 ft). It is thought that they are bathypelagic (deep ocean dwelling) or benthic (bottom dwelling) as they are known to eat crabs.

Their common name derives from the large spiny form of their scales in some species.
