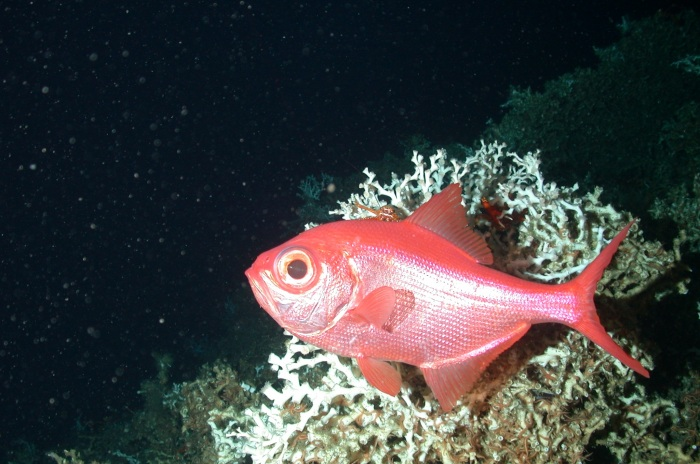
- Beryx decadactylus

Scientific classification
- Kingdom: Animalia
- Phylum: Chordata
- Class: Actinopterygii
- Superorder: Acanthopterygii
- Order: Beryciformes; Regan, 1909

Type species
- Beryx decadactylus (G. Cuvier, 1829)

Suborders
- Holocentroidei; Berycoidei; Stephanoberycoidei

Synonyms
- Stephanoberyciformes Berg 1937; Cetomimiformes

= Beryciformes =

Beryciformes Temporal range: 100.5–0 Ma Late Cretaceous to Recent

Order of fishes

The Beryciformes /ˈbɛrɪsɪfɔːrmiːz/ are a poorly-understood order of carnivorous ray-finned fishes consisting of 7 families, 30 genera, and 161 species. They feed on small fish and invertebrates. Beyond this, little is known about the biology of most member species because of their nocturnal habits and deepwater habitats.

All beryciform species are marine and most live in tropical to temperate, deepwater environments. Most live on the continental shelf and continental slope, with some species being found as deep as 2,000 m (6,600 ft). Some species move closer to the surface at night, while others live entirely in shallow water and are nocturnal, hiding in rock crevices and caves during the day. Several species are mesopelagic and bathypelagic. Beryciformes' bodies are deep and mildly compressed, typically with large eyes that help them see in darker waters. Colors range from red to yellow and brown to black, and sizes range from 8–61 cm (3.1–24.0 in). Member genera include the alfonsinos, squirrelfishes, pricklefishes, and whalefishes. A number of member species are caught commercially, including the alfonsino and the splendid alfonsino.

== Taxonomy ==
Beryciforms first appeared during the Late Cretaceous period and have survived to today in relative abundance. They are considered the most primitive order in Acanthopterygii, and as such are split off at the base of the cladogram below from the rest of the member orders. Beryciforms are distinguished by having 18–19 caudal fin rays, as opposed to percomorphs, which have 17. Having fewer caudal fin rays is considered a sign of a more recently evolved species among fish.

=== Classification ===
The following classification is based on Eschmeyer's Catalog of Fishes:

- Order Beryciformes
  - Suborder Holocentroidei
    - Family Holocentridae Bonaparte, 1833 (soldierfishes & squirrelfishes)
  - Suborder Berycoidei
    - Family Berycidae Lowe, 1839 (alfonsinos & nannygais)
    - Family Melamphaidae Gill, 1893 (bigscale fishes)
  - Suborder Stephanoberycoidei
    - Family Stephanoberycidae Gill, 1884 (pricklefishes)
    - Family Hispidoberycidae Kotlyar, 1981 (spiny-scale pricklefishes)
    - Family Gibberichthyidae Parr, 1933 (gibberfishes)
    - Family Rondeletiidae Goode & Bean, 1895 (redmouth whalefishes)
    - Family Barbourisiidae Parr, 1945 (red/velvet whalefishes)
    - Family Cetomimidae Goode & Bean, 1895 (flabby whalefishes)

The following fossil families are also known:

- Suborder Holocentroidei
  - Family †Tenuicentridae Gayet, 1982
  - Family †Caproberycidae Patterson, 1967
- Suborder Berycoidei
  - Family †Quaesitoberycidae Bannikov & Sorbini, 2005

In the past, the Trachichthyiformes and Polymixiiformes were also placed within this order. However, such a classification is now known to be paraphyletic.

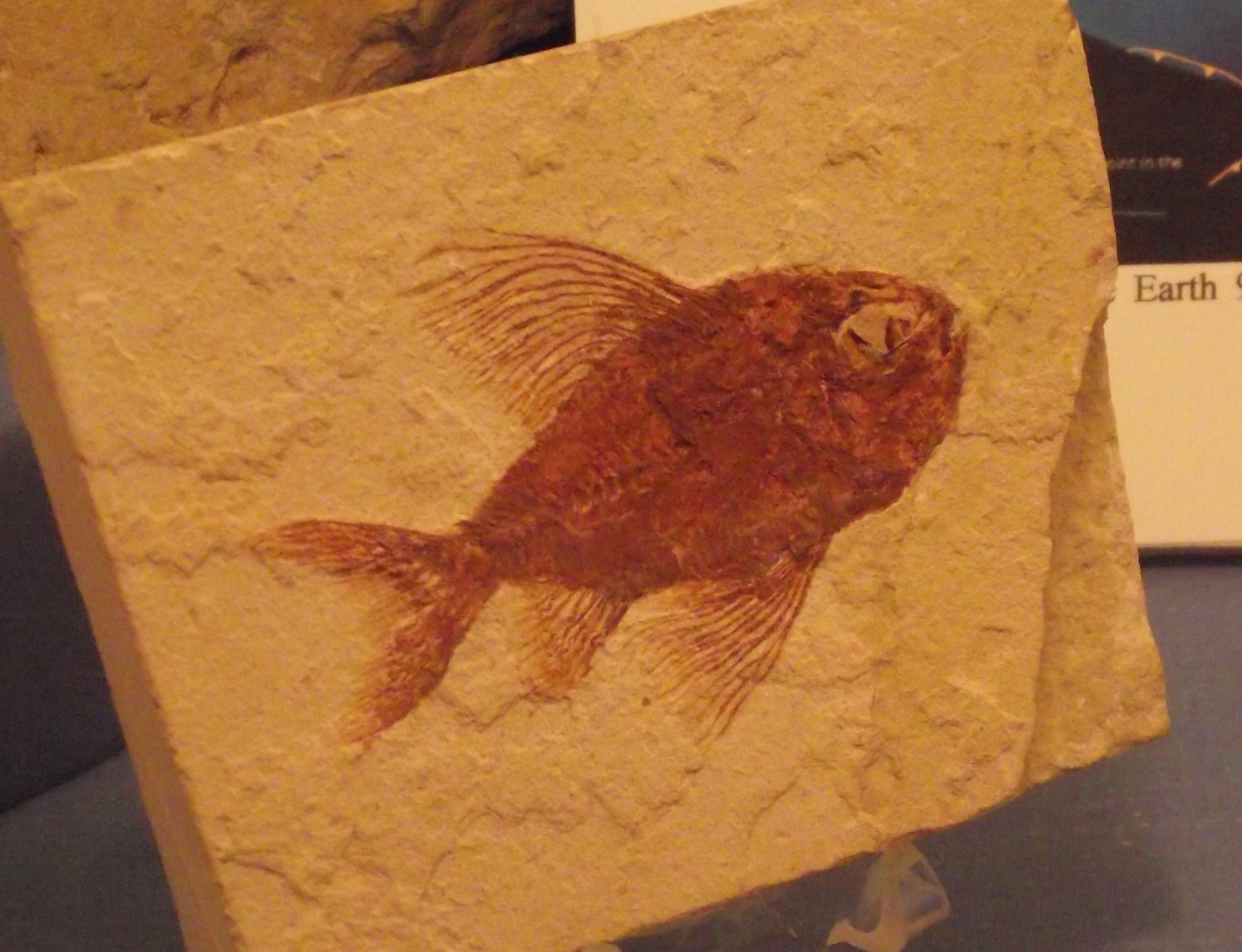
Pseudoberyx syriacus, an extinct beryciform

=== Phylogeny ===
A recent phylogeny based on the work Betancur-Rodriguez et al. 2017. The Gibberichthyidae (gibberfishes) and Hispidoberycidae (spiny-scale pricklefish) of suborder Stephanoberycoidei were not examined.

- - Polymixiiformes (beardfishes)
  - Acanthopterygii
    - Berycimorpha
      - Beryciformes
        - Berycoidei
          - Melamphaidae (ridgeheads or bigscales)
          - Berycidae (alfonsinos and nannygais)
        - Stephanoberycoidei
          - Cetomimidae (flabby whalefishes)
          - - Rondeletiidae (redmouth whalefishes)
            - - Barbourisiidae (velvet whalefish)
              - Stephanoberycidae (pricklefishes)
      - Trachichthyiformes
        - Diretmidae (spinyfins)
        - Trachichthyoidea
          - - Monocentridae (pinecone fishes)
            - Anomalopidae (lanterneye or flashlight fishes)
          - Trachichthyidae (slimeheads, roughies or redfish)
    - - Holocentrimorpha
        - Holocentriformes
          Holocentridae (squirrelfishes and soldierfishes)
      - Percomorpha (perches and allies)

== Human interaction ==
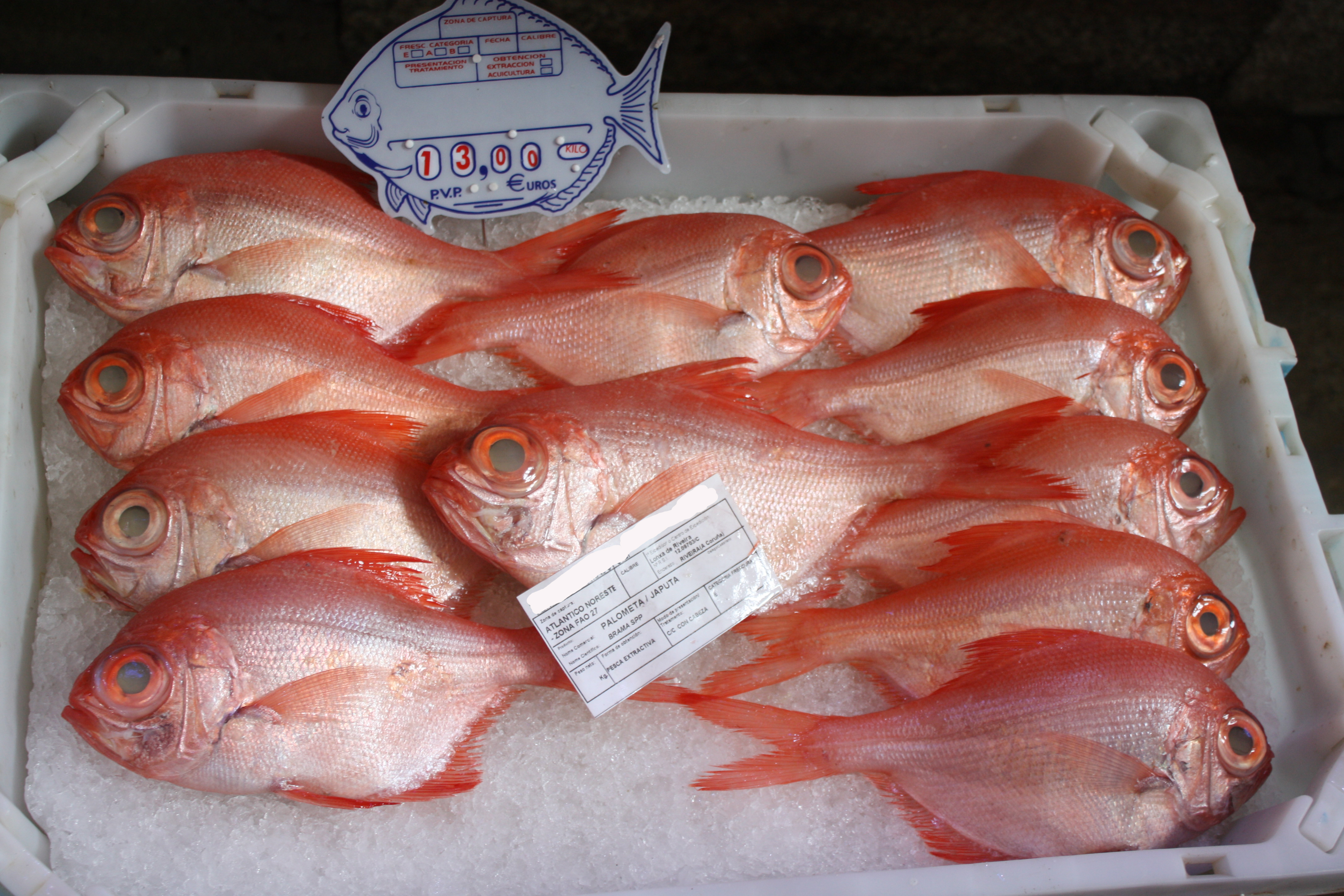
Alfonsinos for sale

The Beryciformes are generally not important to humans, and their trend towards living in deeper waters generally keeps many species away from human activity. Several species are found in the aquarium trade, however. Pineapplefishes are of interest to fishkeepers for their bright colors, while squirrelfishes' shallower reef habitats and bright red colors make them more easily collected. Flashlight fishes are also kept as pets because of the bioluminescent organs underneath their eyes. The alfonsinos and orange roughy are of a different interest to humans, targeted by deepwater commercial fisheries. Increased catches could lead to steep population declines for these species as their extended lifespans make them vulnerable to overfishing. The orange roughy, for example, can live up to 149 years, but takes anywhere from 23 to 40 years to begin reproducing. Despite these risks, most of the species that have been evaluated by the International Union for Conservation of Nature (IUCN) are listed as Least Concern or Data Deficient; only a few are classified as Vulnerable.

== Timeline of genera ==
The Beryciformes first appeared in the Late Cretaceous and still survive today in relative abundance.
