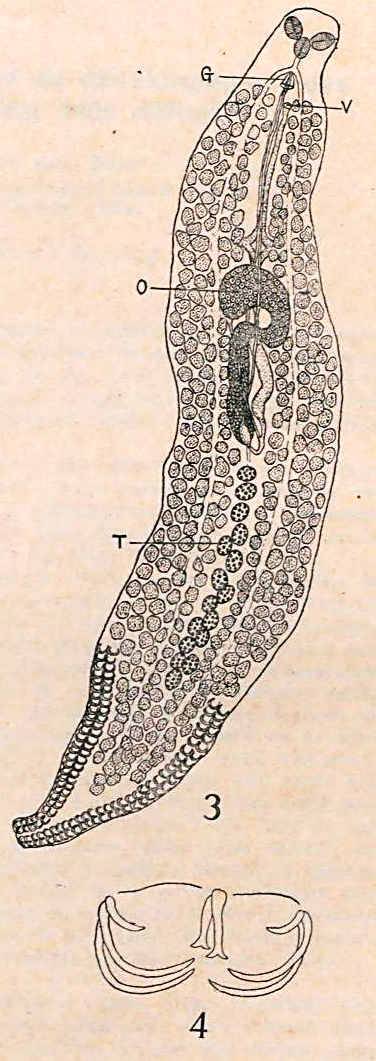
- Microcotyle mouwoi, body and clamp, drawings from original description

Scientific classification
- Kingdom: Animalia
- Phylum: Platyhelminthes
- Class: Monogenea
- Order: Mazocraeidea
- Family: Microcotylidae
- Genus: Microcotyle
- Species: M. mouwoi

Binomial name
- Microcotyle mouwoi Ishii & Sawada, 1938

Synonyms
- Polylabris cf. mamaevi Ogawa et Egusa, 1980; Solostamenides mouwoi (Ishii & Sawada, 1938) Unnithan1971

= Microcotyle mouwoi =

Species of worms

Microcotyle mouwoi is a species of monogenea, parasitic on the gills of a marine fish. It belongs to the family Microcotylidae.

== Taxonomy ==
Microcotyle mouwoi was initially described from the gills of Epinephelus chlorostigma and Siganus fuscescens off Japan. Subsequently, it was categorized under the new genus Solostamenides and termed as Solostamenides mouwoi. Due to significant differences between Microcotyle mouwoi and Solostamenides species, they couldn't be consolidated under a single genus. Additionally, Microcotyle mouwoi was documented in Siganus sutor as well.

Specimens of Microcotyle mouwoi from Siganus sutor were meticulously examined, leading to the suggestion of a synonymy between Microcotyle mouwoi and Polylabris cf. mamaevi. This proposition was accompanied by the hypothesis that all (or most) microcotylids found in Siganus spp. might constitute a single species. However, due to unavailability of the type specimens of M. mouwoi for examination, the authors were cautious about fully merging the two species.

== Description ==
Microcotyle mouwoi exhibits the general morphology characteristic of all Microcotyle species. Its body is flat and encompasses an anterior section housing most of its organs, as well as a posterior part referred to as the haptor. This haptor is symmetrical and bears numerous clamps, arranged in two rows on each side.These haptor clamps serve to attach the organism to the gills of the fish. Additionally, two small buccal suckers are present at the anterior end.

The digestive system comprises an anterior terminal mouth, a muscular pharynx, and a posterior intestine with two lateral blind-ending branches. Within each adult, both male and female reproductive organs are present. These reproductive structures include an anterior genital atrium adorned with spines, a dorsal vagina, a single ovary, and a series of testes positioned posterior to the ovary.

The description by Ishii and Sawada in 1938 includes the following: "Elongated body 2.2-3.2 mm long and 0.378- 0.55mm wide. Two oval anterior suckers lies at the anterior end of the body.The haptor has 28-30 clamps. The mouth, which opens at the anterior end of the body leads into the pharynx. The pharynx lies in contact with two anterior suckers. The short oesophagus divides into two intestinal canals, which run to near the end of the haptor. Male organs comprises testicular follicles, longitudinally on the median line at the posterior portion of the body. The vas deferens from testes winds on forward along the ovary, into the genital opening, which has four long spines. The female organs includes the elongated ovary with the slender end posterior and the broad anterior part to the right. The oviduct receives the vitelloduct and becomes the slender ootype. The uterus proceeds forward to the genital opening. The vitellaria fill up the lateral body from a little behind the genital opening to the end of the haptor. The vaginal opening lies median, dorsal and behind the genital opening."

== Differential diagnosis ==
Microcotyle mouwoi resembles Microcotyle elegans, but differs in the number of the testes and the clamps and also in the character of the atrial spines and the vitellaria.

== Etymology ==
The species name mouwoi is after the Japanese name of the host fish, mouwo (Epinephelus chlorostigma).

== Hosts and localities ==
The hosts are the brownspotted grouper Epinephelus chlorostigma (Serranidae) ("Mouwo" in Japanese) and the Mottled spinefoot Siganus fuscescens (Siganidae) ("Aigo" in Japanese). The type-locality is off Japan. In the same paper, another species was described, Microcotyle aigoi, from Siganus fuscescens. Microcotyle mouwoi was also reported from the whitespotted rabbitfish, Siganus sutor off Kenya, and off Guam, Pacific Ocean,

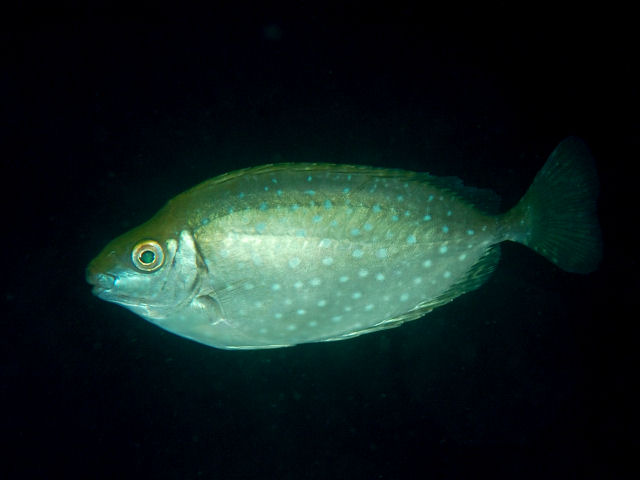
The mottled spinefoot Siganus fuscescens or "aigo" is a host of Microcotyle mouwoi

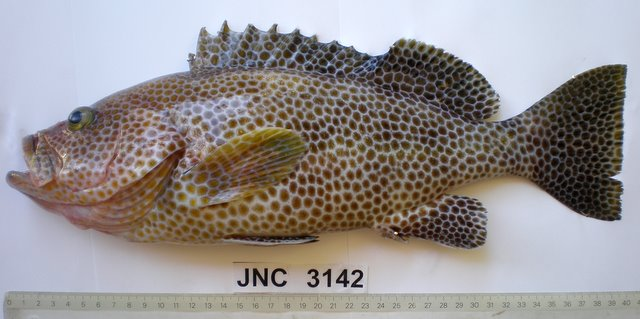
Epinephelus chlorostigma or "mouwo" is also a host of Microcotyle mouwoi

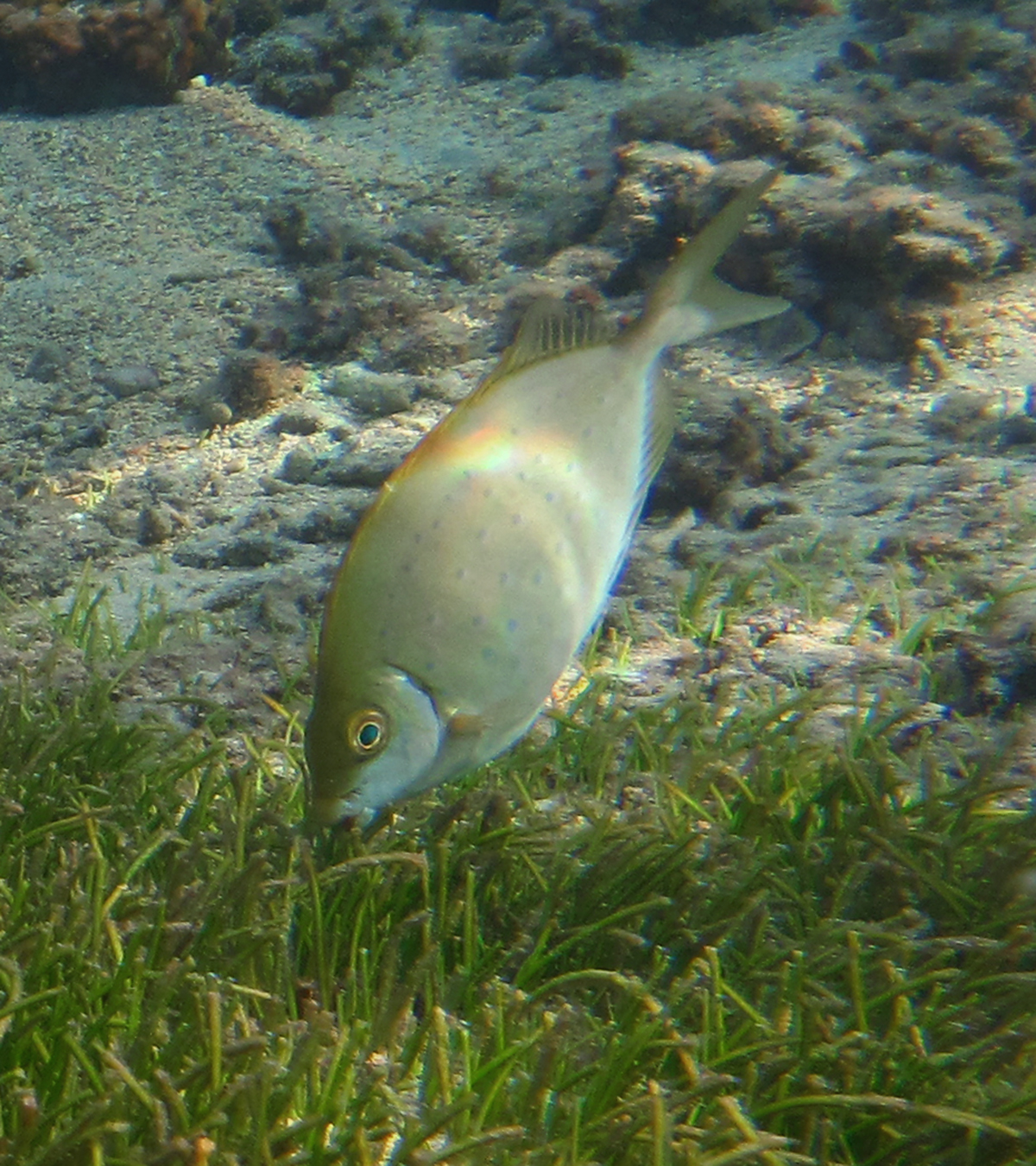
The shoemaker spinefoot Siganus sutor, another Siganidae reported as host of Microcotyle mouwoi
