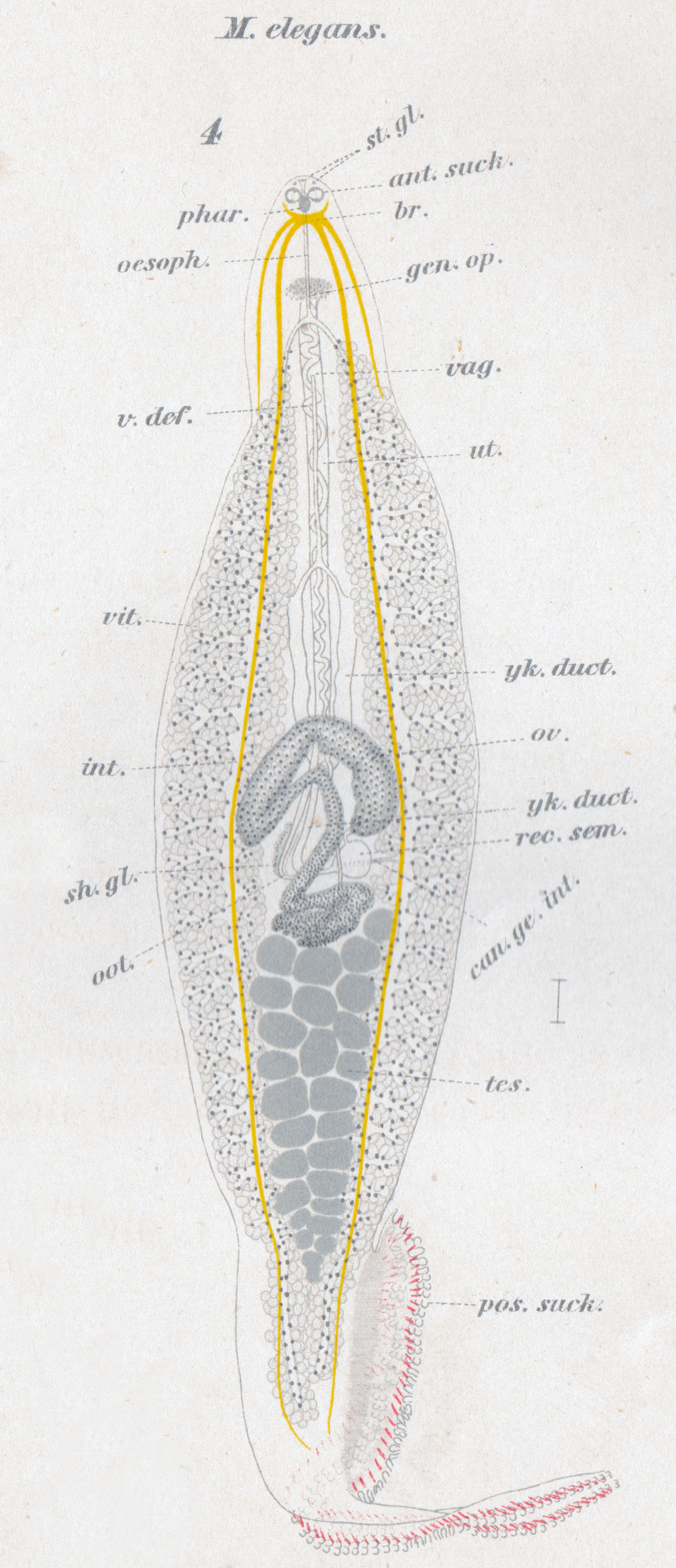
- Microcotyle elegans, drawing from original description

Scientific classification
- Kingdom: Animalia
- Phylum: Platyhelminthes
- Class: Monogenea
- Order: Mazocraeidea
- Family: Microcotylidae
- Genus: Microcotyle
- Species: M. elegans

Binomial name
- Microcotyle elegans Goto, 1894

= Microcotyle elegans =

Species of worms

Microcotyle elegans is a species of monogenean, parasitic on the gills of a marine fish. It belongs to the family Microcotylidae.

== Taxonomy ==
Microcotyle elegans was first described by Seitarō Gotō in 1894, from the gills of Scombrops chilodipteroides (Scombropidae) (currently Scombrops boops).

== Description ==
Microcotyle elegans has the general morphology of all species of Microcotyle, with a symmetrical slender body, comprising an anterior part which contains most organs and a posterior part called the haptor. The haptor is symmetrical, a little longer than the entire length of the body and bears about 100 clamps, arranged as two rows, one on each side. The clamps of the haptor attach the animal to the gill of the fish. There are also two buccal septated suckers at the anterior extremity. The digestive organs include an anterior, terminal mouth, a pharynx, an oesophagus and a posterior intestine with two lateral branches provided with numerous secondary branches on the inner side; the left branch is longer and both branches extend into the haptor. Each adult contains male and female reproductive organs. The reproductive organs include an anterior genital atrium opening a little in front of the beginning of the intestinal bifurcation, armed with numerous conical spines, a medio-dorsal vagina situated four times as far in front of the anterior end of the ovary as it is behind the common genital pore, a single ovary and 27 large testes which are posterior to the ovary.

== Hosts and localities ==
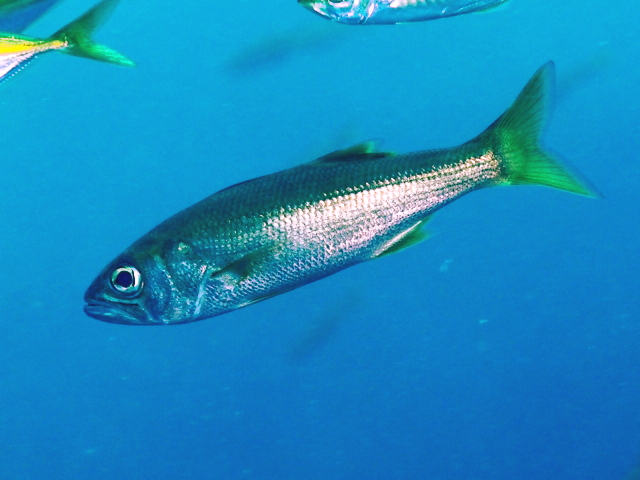
The Gnomefish Scombrops boops is the type host of Microcotyle elegans

The type-host is Scombrops cheilodipteroides Scombropidae (currently Scombrops boops). The type-locality is off Japan.
