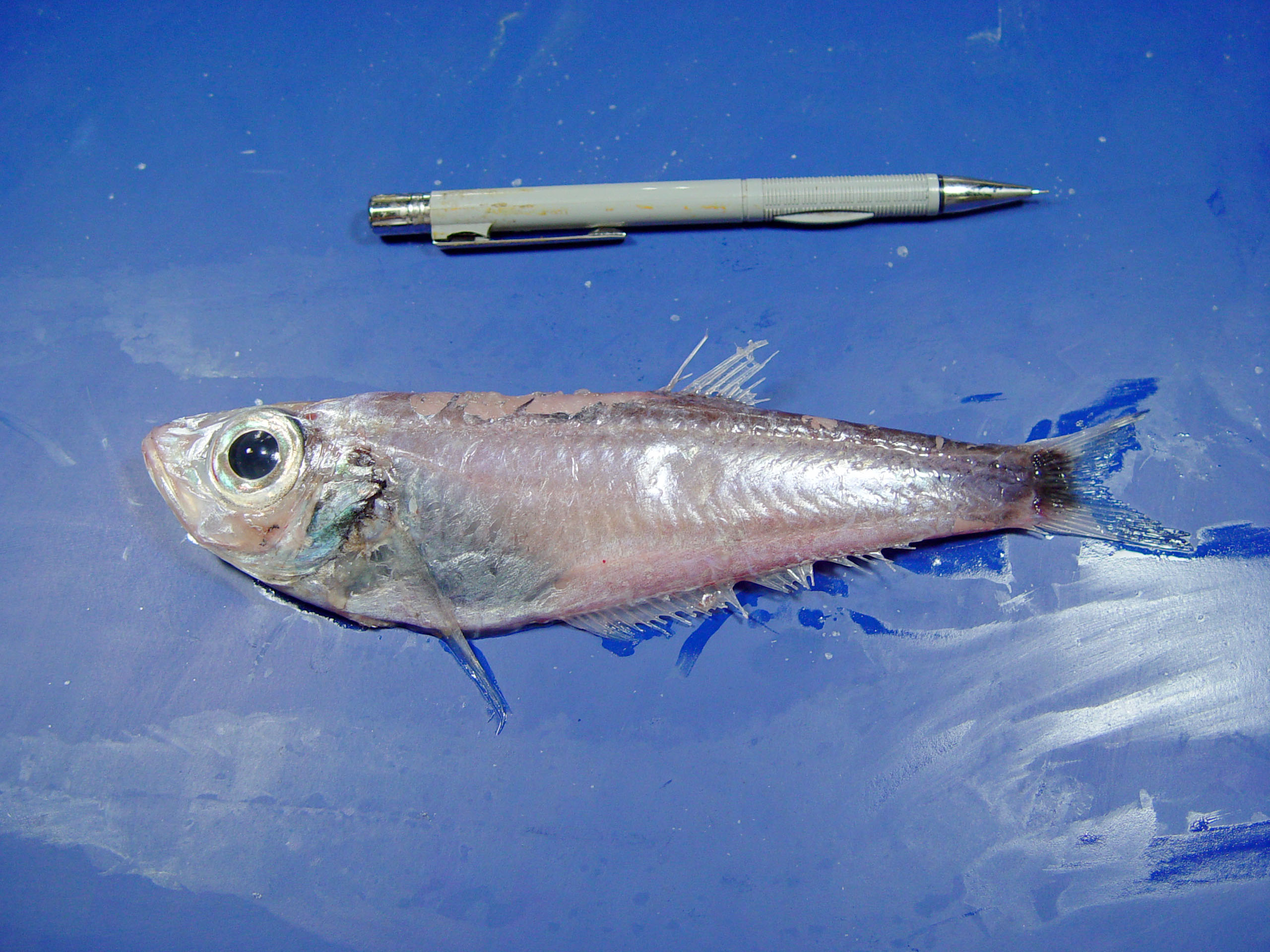
- A member of the family of deepsea herrings (Bathyclupea argentea).

Scientific classification
- Kingdom: Animalia
- Phylum: Chordata
- Class: Actinopterygii
- Division: Teleostei
- Order: Acropomatiformes
- Family: Bathyclupeidae
- Genus: Bathyclupea; Alcock, 1891

Type species
- Bathyclupea hoskynii Alcock 1891

= Bathyclupea =

Genus of ray-finned fishes

Bathyclupea is a genus of ray-finned fishes belonging to a small family Bathyclupeidae.

== Species ==
There are currently 3 recognized species in this genus:

- Bathyclupea hoskynii Alcock, 1891 (Indian deepsea herring)
- Bathyclupea nikparini Prokofiev, 2014 (Parin's deepsea herring)
- Bathyclupea schroederi Dick, 1962 (Schroeder's deepsea herring)
