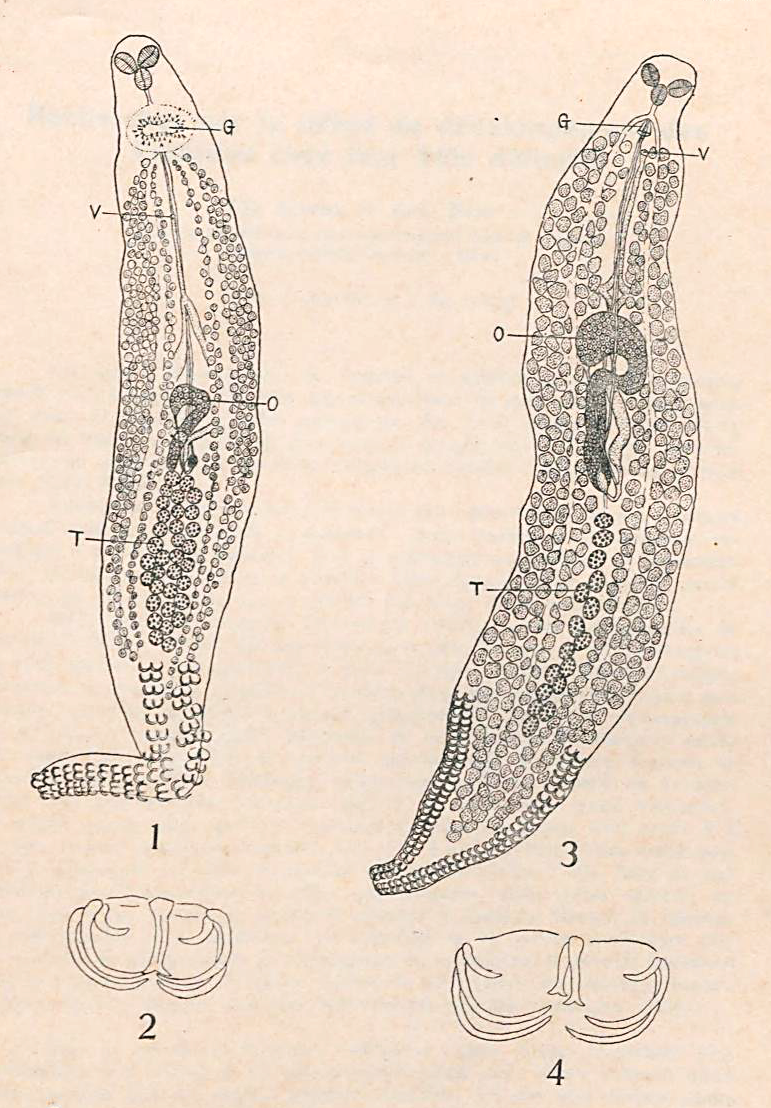
- Microcotyle aigoi, body and clamp (left); the other species (right) is Microcotyle mouwoi

Scientific classification
- Kingdom: Animalia
- Phylum: Platyhelminthes
- Class: Monogenea
- Order: Mazocraeidea
- Family: Microcotylidae
- Genus: Microcotyle
- Species: M. aigoi

Binomial name
- Microcotyle aigoi Ishii & Sawada, 1937

= Microcotyle aigoi =

Species of worms

Microcotyle aigoi is a species of monogenean, parasitic on the gills of a marine fish. It belongs to the family Microcotylidae.

== Morphology ==
Microcotyle aigoi is 2–3.7 mm in length and 0.2-0.4 mm in width and has the general morphology of all species of Microcotyle, with a flat body, comprising an anterior part which contains most organs and a posterior part called the haptor. The haptor is symmetrical and bears a number of clamps, arranged as two rows, one on each side. The clamps of the haptor attach the animal to the gill of the fish. There are also two small buccal suckers at the anterior extremity. The digestive organs include an anterior, terminal mouth, a muscular pharynx, and a posterior intestine with two lateral blind-ending branches. Each adult contains male and female reproductive organs. The reproductive organs include an anterior genital atrium, with spines, a dorsal vagina, a single ovary, and a number of testes which are posterior to the ovary.

== Etymology ==
The species name aigoi is after the Japanese name of the host fish, Aigo.

== Hosts and localities ==
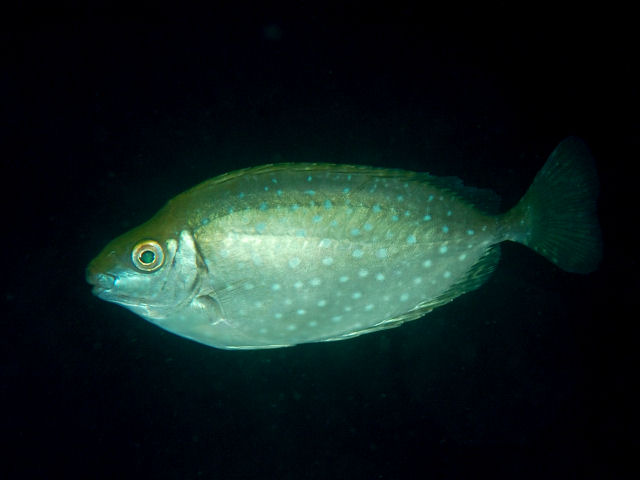
The Mottled spinefoot Siganus fuscescens of "Aigo" is the host of Microcotyle aigoi

The type-host is the Mottled spinefoot Siganus fuscescens (Siganidae) and the type-locality is off Japan. In the same paper, Ishii and Sawada also described another species, Microcotyle mouwoi, also from Siganus fuscescens and from another fish.
