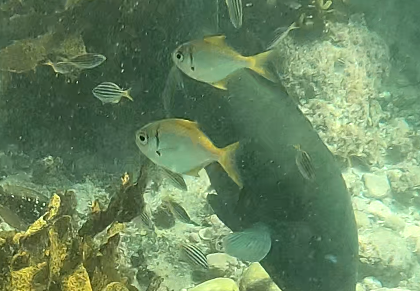

Scientific classification
- Kingdom: Animalia
- Phylum: Chordata
- Class: Actinopterygii
- Order: Acropomatiformes
- Genus: Schuettea
- Species: S. scalaripinnis

Binomial name
- Schuettea scalaripinnis Steindachner, 1866

= Schuettea scalaripinnis =

Species of fish

Schuettea scalaripinnis is a species of marine ray-finned fish in the family Monodactylidae, the moonyfishes. Its common names include eastern pomfred, or ladder-finned pomfret.

A small schooling species up to 24 cm long, found in coastal areas off southern New South Wales to central Queensland. Often seen in large schools off sheltered rocky ledges.
