= Symphysanodon andersoni =

Scientific classification
- Domain: Eukaryota
- Kingdom: Animalia
- Phylum: Chordata
- Class: Actinopterygii
- Order: Acropomatiformes
- Family: Symphysanodontidae
- Genus: Symphysanodon
- Species: S. andersoni

Binomial name
- Symphysanodon andersoni Kotthaus, 1974

Species of ray-finned fish

Symphysanodon andersoni, the buck-toothed slopefish, is a species of marine ray-finned fish found in the western Indian Ocean.

== Description ==
This species reaches a length of 15.7 cm (6.2 in).

== Etymology ==
The fish bears the name William D. Anderson Jr. in recognition of his research on Symphysanodon, his examination of this species, and his sharing of his findings with Kotthaus. Anderson, Jr. works at the Grice Marine Biological Laboratory in Charleston, South Carolina.
