= S. oculatus =

S. oculatus may refer to:

- Sciurus oculatus, the Peters's squirrel, a tree squirrel species
- Scombrops oculatus, a fish species

== Synonyms ==
- Sphagebranchus oculatus, a synonym of Dalophis imberbis, the armless snake eel, an eel species
- Squalus oculatus, a synonym of Hemiscyllium ocellatum, the epaulette shark, a shark species
