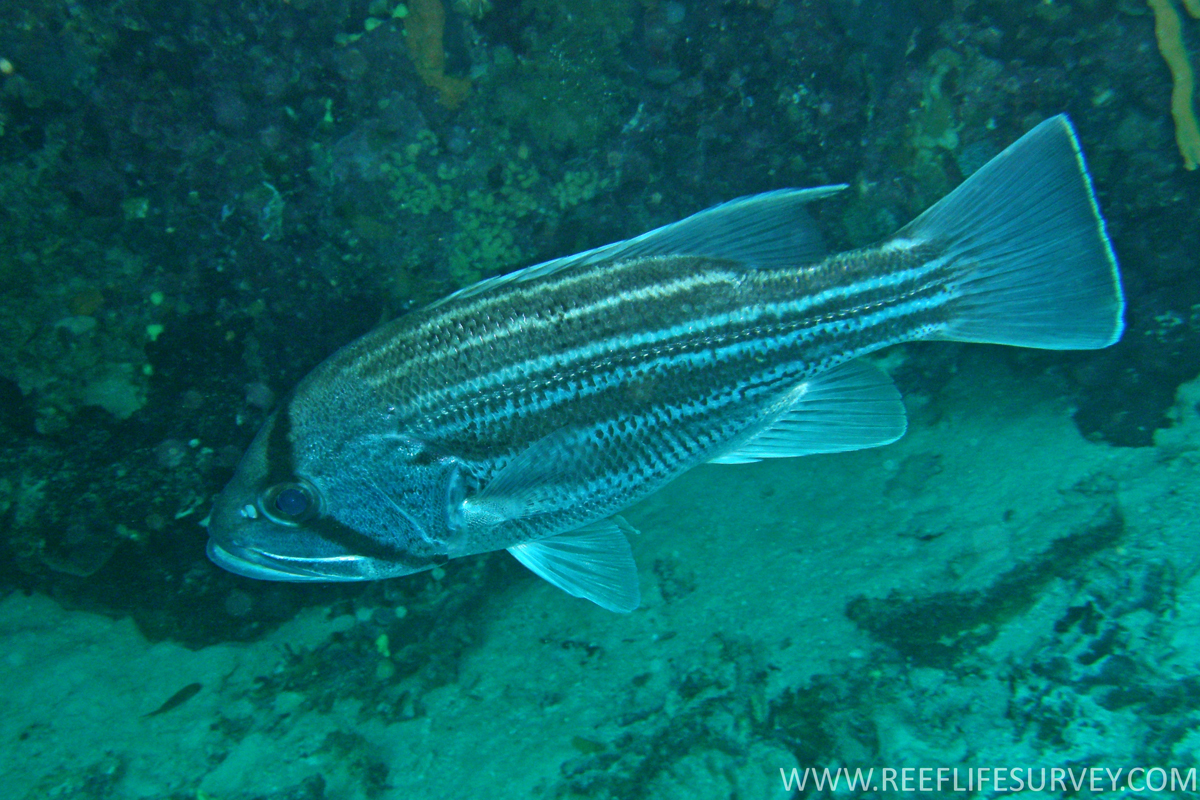
- Glaucosoma hebraicum at the Abrolhos Islands, Western Australia

Scientific classification
- Kingdom: Animalia
- Phylum: Chordata
- Class: Actinopterygii
- Order: Acropomatiformes
- Family: Glaucosomatidae
- Genus: Glaucosoma
- Species: G. hebraicum

Binomial name
- Glaucosoma hebraicum J. Richardson, 1845 J. Richardson, 1845

Synonyms
- Breviperca lineata Castelnau, 1875; Glaucosoma buergeri J. Richardson and Gray, 1845

= Glaucosoma hebraicum =

Species of fish

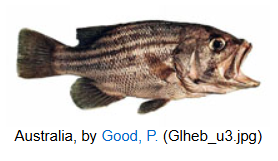
Good, P. G. Hebraicum Australia. Wikimedia Commons.

Glaucosoma hebraicum, also commonly known as the West Australian dhufish, Westralian jewfish, West Australian pearl perch, Dhuie, Jewie, and Dhufish amongst the locals, is a species of fish in the family Glaucosomatidae, 'the Pearl Perches'. First recorded in 1845 by a scientist known as Richardson, in Western Australia this species also has synonyms including Glaucosoma burger and Glaucosoma lineata. Endearingly also referred to as the "Jewel of the Crown", it is known for its delicious taste and great size. Glaucosoma hebraicum is popular among recreational and angler fishers, a victim to aggregate fishing most especially during spawning season, as well as being a great model for fish hatchery research.

== Sexual Dimorphism ==
Males are commonly distinguished by a strong vertically curved band across the eye followed by light speckles throughout the body paired with a dorsal filament on an adult or 4-5 curved lateral lines stretching from the operculum to the end of the peduncle on juveniles. Females aren't quite as decorated and instead have a curved lateral line starting at the top of the operculum to the end of the peduncle. Though females lack the additional lateral lines and the dorsal filament, the body shape and size are identical to that as the males, sharing distinctively large black eyes that allows them to see at large depths. The females have the eye band found in males but is lightly pigmented.

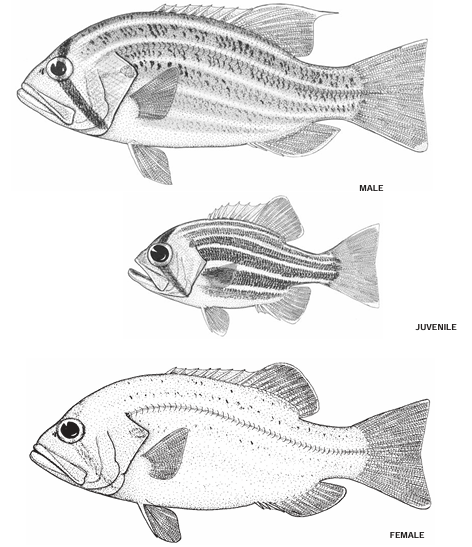
Figure [2]. McKay, R. J. Glaucosoma hebraicum: Male, Juvenile, and Female. 1997, FAO Species Catalogue, vol. 17. FAO, 1997. Wikimedia Commons.

== Description ==
The Dhufish has a moderately compressed body shape measuring as an adult around 80 cm though have been reported to measure from 50-122cm and weighing typically 32kg though some reports mention 26 kg.

The pearlescent, silver-grey colour of this fish is broken by roughly six dark stripes "with silver, bronze and lilac reflections". It is distinguished from a species found in the eastern states of Australia by a dark vertical band across the eye and exhibits sexual dimorphism. Striping is prominent in juveniles and fades as the fish matures at about three or four years old, leaving males with subtle lateral white strips stretching from the operculum to the end of the peduncle and an elongated dorsal filament. Some males may additionally have light speckling across the body. Inversely, females only share the resemblance of a few features including the body shape, size, and large black eyes with males. Females have a single, black, upcurved lateral line, subtle band across the eyes, and a slightly forked emarginate caudal fin.

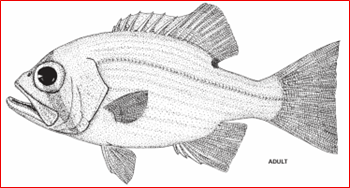
Figure [3]. McKay, R.J. Glaucosoma buergeri, Adult. 1997, FAO Species Catalogue, vol. 17. FAO, 1997. Wikimedia Commons.

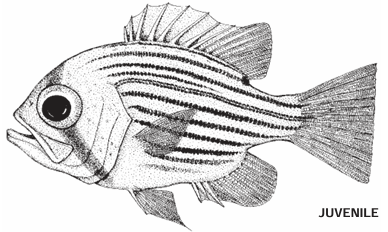
Figure [4]. McKay, R. J. Glaucosoma buergeri, Juvenile. 1997, FAO Species Catalogue, vol. 17. FAO, 1997. Wikimedia Commons.

=== Biology and Species Description ===
According to "Pearl Perches of the World", Dhufish have dorsal fins with eight spines in ascending length, with 11 soft dorsal rays in which the fourth dorsal ray has an elongated filament (males only). The anal fin has three spines followed by nine soft rays, 16 pectoral rays, and a subtle emarginate caudal fin with four to six gill rakers and small canine-like teeth in the upper jaw. Taking a close look at the profile, both males and females also exhibit a minor indentation at the front of the eyes along the outline of the body, with large terminal and upturned mouths with pharyngeal teeth. The Dhufish have a total of five different fins which include the dorsal fin (spines and rays), emarginate caudal fin, pectoral fin, pelvic fin, and anal fin (spines and rays). The compressed body shape allows for short bursts in swimming for hunting and evading predators, the emarginate caudal tail for propulsion and maneuverability, both spined and rayed dorsal and anal fins that increase the overall proportion of the fish to avoid predation, and large eyes that are adapted for dark waters. At full maturity they reach an average of 1.2m in total length. They reach maturity at the age of 3–4 years and can live for more than 40 years. Not to be mistaken for Glaucosoma buergeri, that does not exhibit sexual dimorphism and heavily resembles mature female Dhufish. To differentiate the two, G. buergeri, has a dark spot at the base of the end of the dorsal fin and the absence of the dorsal filament as seen in Figures 3-4. A study conducted in 2013 by Parsons et al. presented evidence of auditory communication through the use of vibrations with the swim bladder.

== Distribution ==
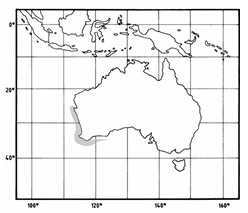
Figure [5]. McKay, R. J. Geographical Distribution of Glaucosoma hebraicum. 1997, FAO Species Catalogue, vol. 17. FAO, 1997. Wikimedia Commons.

It is native to Western Australia, and its home range stretches from the base of Shark Bay passing through Augusta reaching Esperance, shaded in grey in Figure 6. It is endemic to the waters around Western Australia from Shark Bay to the Archipelago of the Recherche at depths to 200 m (660 ft) passing through Augusta reaching Esperance, shaded in grey in Figure 6. The Dhufish has been seen occurring at depths of 20–50 m (66–164 ft). Dhufish are found in coastal waters, but more commonly in deeply submerged reefs and rough bottoms, in caves and wreckage. It has been seen socially with schools of fish as well as roaming independently. This species is important to local commercial fisheries, recreational fishing as well as in research for fish hatcheries and high commercial importance.

== Life History ==
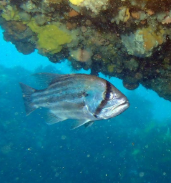
Figure [6]. Vranken Martin. Australia, Busselton April 2019 — 25 cm by Vranken Martin amongst the reef. 1 Jan. 2019. Wikimedia Commons.

The peak breeding season is between December and March with its spawning season in Spring. They are broadcast spawners, with floating eggs developing into plankton-feeding pelagic larvae. Spawning happens from early Winter through early Spring, between 40-50m in rocky bottoms. Males will move from deep waters to the spawning ground first and females follow shortly after. During spawning season, males will appear to showcase an elongate filament on the end of the dorsal fin, whereas the female dorsal fin will appear more rounded. Adults occur in various inshore habitats, from hard flat shelf areas to rocky reefs, wrecks, underwater caverns, and deep waters. Fecundity increases with size and age, with some females carrying up to eight million eggs in between with an average total length of 84 cm. Following the spawning season, many fish disperse but usually large males will stay and feed in shallow waters near the shorelines where they easily get overfished.

=== Threats ===
This is species is particularly vulnerable to overfishing in small reefs. It can take up to three years for a full recovery as this is a 'slow growing' species, especially with the introduction and use of sonar equipment targeting small reefs in deeper waters. Dhufish, like other fish, are aged using the number of growth zones in whole otoliths, which is thought to slightly underage fish.

=== Ecology ===
Dhufish live an average of 40 years making them especially sensitive to recovering from overfishing. The Dhufish has an upturned terminal mouth and pharyngeal teeth, for preying on smaller reef fish and crustaceans. Its large black eyes allow it to hunt at night, being a nocturnal fish, and its large flat caudal tail allows it to use small energy bursts. It also has anal and pelvic fins that not only aid in agility and maneuverability, but its pelvic fins also allow it to hold onto rocks as it enjoys rocky bottoms and caves. Though the Dhufish is not especially large, it can be inferred that it is preyed upon by sharks and other large fish. The Dhufish does not migrate but enjoys different depths, frequently traveling between deep reefs and caves to shallower waters for feeding and spawning, when in season. As mentioned previously, males will display a dorsal filament which is paired with small testes strongly suggesting that this species relies on lekking. Its habitat is diverse and includes the open ocean, deep and shallow waters, rock reefs, hard bottoms, and even areas high in the water column.

=== Behavior and Diet ===
It is also common for Dhufish to become territorial in caves. Dhufish school during the day and are mostly nocturnal feeders. They have been known to feed on mollusks, crustaceans, and small reef fish. The study 'Identification of critical habitats for juvenile Dhufish (Glaucosoma hebraicum) NRM Project 09038 – Protecting Inshore and Demersal Finfish' in 2012, concluded that critical habitat for juvenile Dhufish, from eleven to fifteen months old, show preference to habitats with mixtures of sand with light seagrass, reefs with sponges, macroalgae, sessile invertebrates. This same study concluded that juveniles fed on mysids, gadiform cod, confirming that from a young age they are also piscivorous. In captivity, they are fed a mixture of copepods, small crustaceans such as nauplii and rotifers. While raised in captivity for fishery research, this diet encouraged significant growth during the larval stage.

== Conservation Status ==
The species is not listed on the IUCN red list; however, much research has been done on this species in fisheries due to concerns of aggregate fishing. According to a study conducted in 2009, the majority of fish species found in West Australia are aggregate spawners, making them vulnerable and victim to aggregate fishing. Declines in Pink Snapper, Spanish Mackerel, and Samson Fish became of concern as fisheries learned about 'the aggregating phenomenon' when enforcing new management strategies in 2001. In 2004, to protect these fish, a nine-day fishing closure was implemented and enforced, increasing the likelihood of successful spawning. Other measures like catch quotas, more temporal closures, and banning traps during this season were implemented in 2003.

Due to growing concern over the cost of long-term aggregate overfishing and its negative impact on fish stocks and 'key recreational species of fish,' a study was conducted with intent to improve both the sustainability of both fish stock and production as well as increasing public understanding and awareness of such strategies. Dhufish, among other specie test subjects including the Samson fish, Mulloway, Pink snapper, and Bight redfish all had small acoustic transmitters, some surgically attached, to record their activities as they aggregate for spawning. This study determined that Dhufish used musculature in their swim bladders to make vibrations and send acoustic signals. This test confirmed that Dhufish, along with Baitfish, spawn north of Bunbury and have the heaviest spawning takes place in the Spring. According to Australian law, there is not minimum size limit for this species, however there is an enforced a daily bag limit of two (excluding Abrolhos Islands), and one (Abrolhos Islands), a boat limit of four total demersal scalefish in West Coast Bioregion, and closed seasons throughout the year during aggregate spawning.
