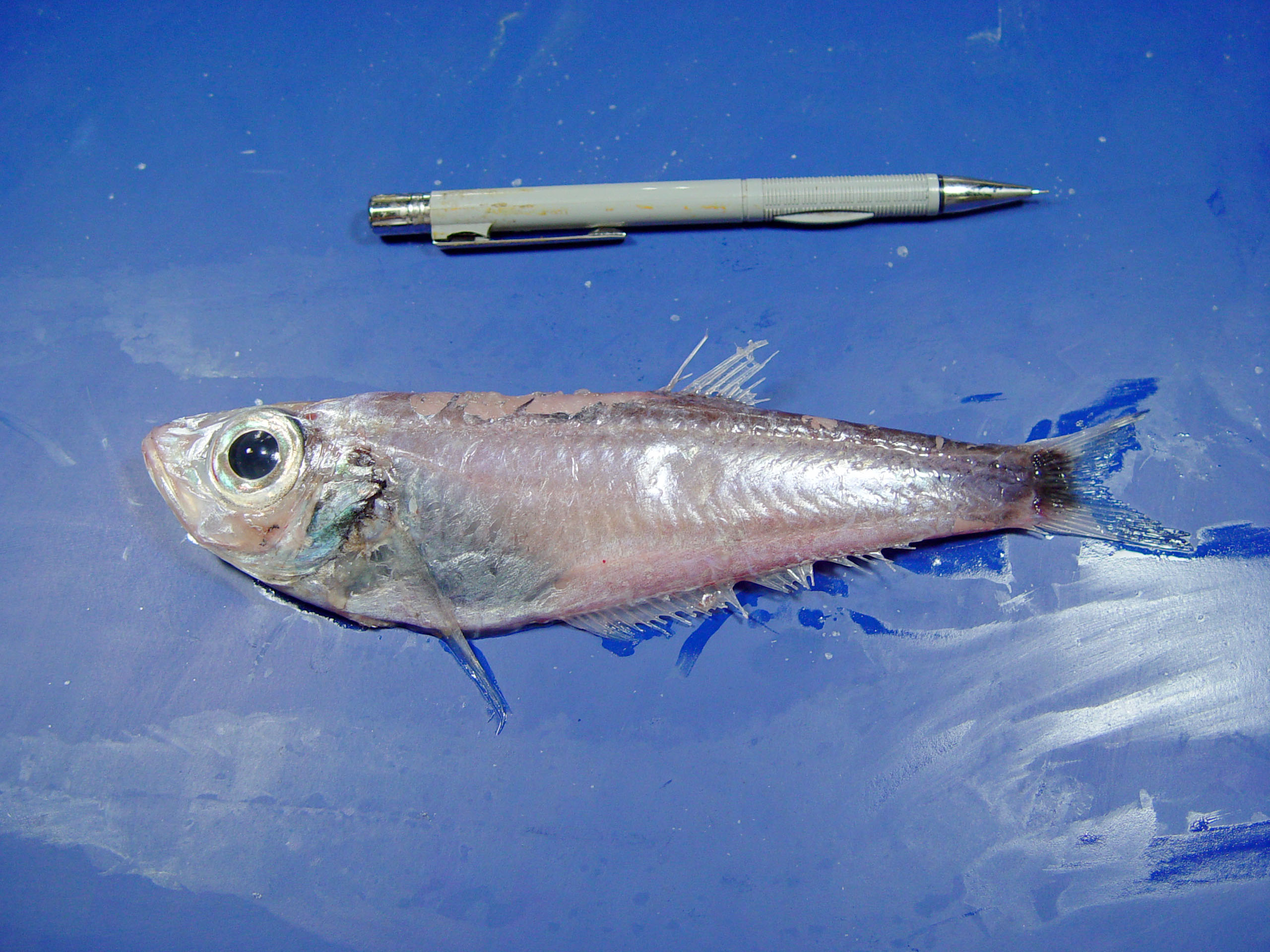
- Neobathyclupea argentea

Scientific classification
- Kingdom: Animalia
- Phylum: Chordata
- Class: Actinopterygii
- Order: Acropomatiformes
- Family: Bathyclupeidae; T. N. Gill, 1896

Genera
- see text

= Bathyclupeidae =

Bathyclupeidae Temporal range: 55–0 Ma Early Eocene to Present

Family of ray-finned fishes

Bathyclupeidae is a family of acropomatiform ray-finned fish, called deep sea herrings. They are marine fishes found in tropical waters of the Atlantic Ocean, Gulf of Mexico, Indian Ocean and Pacific Ocean. They grow up to about 20 cm long.

Despite their name and close resemblance to them, they are not closely related to true herrings and their relatives in the order Clupeiformes.

== Genera ==
The following two genera, containing 10 species, are classified within the family Bathyclupeidae.

- Bathyclupea Alcock, 1891
  - Bathyclupea hoskynii Alcock 1891
  - Bathyclupea nikparini Prokofiev2014
  - Bathyclupea schroederi Dick, 1962
- Neobathyclupea Prokofiev, 2014
  - Neobathyclupea argentea (Goode & Bean, 1896)
  - Neobathyclupea elongate (Trunov, 1975)
  - Neobathyclupea gracilis (Fowler, 1938)
  - Neobathyclupea japanotaiwana (Prokofiev, 2014)
  - Neobathyclupea malayana (Weber, 1913)
  - Neobathyclupea megaceps (Fowler 1938)
  - Neobathyclupea melanoptera Prokofiev, Gon & Psomadakis, 2016
