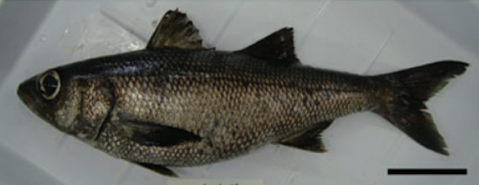

Scientific classification
- Kingdom: Animalia
- Phylum: Chordata
- Class: Actinopterygii
- Division: Teleostei
- Order: Acropomatiformes
- Family: Scombropidae
- Genus: Scombrops
- Species: S. gilberti

Binomial name
- Scombrops gilberti (Jordan & Snyder, 1901)

Synonyms
- Telescopias gilberti Jordan & Snyder, 1901

= Scombrops gilberti =

Species of ray-finned fish

Scombrops gilberti is a species of marine ray-finned fish, a gnomefish from the family Scombropidae. It is found in the western Pacific Ocean where it has been recorded off Hokkaido and south to Suruga Bay. It grows to a maximum total length of 120 centimetres (47 in). This species was first formally described as Telescopias gilberti in 1901 by the American ichthyologists David Starr Jordan (1851–1931) and John Otterbein Snyder (1867–1943) with the type locality given as the sea between Misaki, Chiba and Oshima Island in Japan. The specific name honours the American ichthyologist Charles Henry Gilbert (1859–1928).
