= Neobathyclupea melanoptera =

Scientific classification
- Kingdom: Animalia
- Phylum: Chordata
- Class: Actinopterygii
- Order: Acropomatiformes
- Family: Bathyclupeidae
- Genus: Neobathyclupea
- Species: N. melanoptera

Binomial name
- Neobathyclupea melanoptera Prokofiev, Gon & Psomadakis, 2016

Species of ray-finned fish

Neobathyclupea melanoptera is a species of ray-finned fish in the family Bathyclupeidae found off Myanmar
