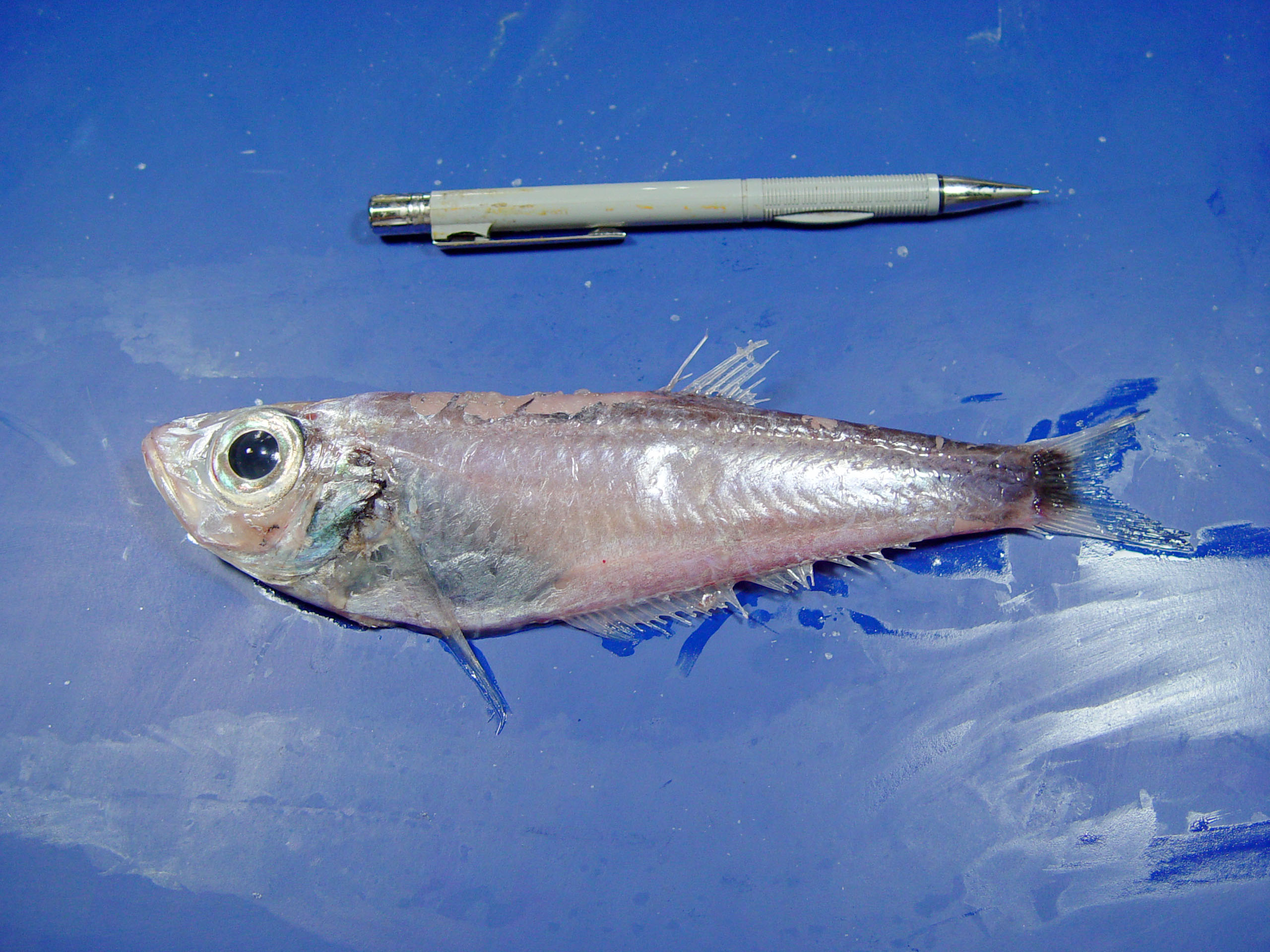
- Deepsea herring (Neobathyclupea argentea)

Scientific classification
- Kingdom: Animalia
- Phylum: Chordata
- Class: Actinopterygii
- Order: Acropomatiformes
- Family: Bathyclupeidae
- Genus: Neobathyclupea; Prokofiev, 2014

Type species
- Bathyclupea malayana Weber, 1913

= Neobathyclupea =

Genus of ray-finned fishes

Neobathyclupea is a genus of ray-finned fish in the family Bathyclupeidae found in the Atlantic, Indian and Pacific Ocean.

== Species ==
There are currently 7 recognized species in this genus:

- Neobathyclupea argentea (Goode & T. H. Bean, 1896) (West Atlantic deep-sea herring)
- Neobathyclupea elongata (Trunov, 1975) (Slender deep-sea herring)
- Neobathyclupea gracilis (Fowler, 1938) (West Pacific deep-sea herring)
- Neobathyclupea japanotaiwana (Prokofiev, 2014) (North Pacific deep-sea herring)
- Neobathyclupea malayana (M. C. W. Weber, 1913) (Malaysian deep-sea herring)
- Neobathyclupea megaceps (Fowler, 1938) (Big-headed deep-sea herring)
- Neobathyclupea melanoptera Prokofiev, Gon & Psomadakis, 2016
