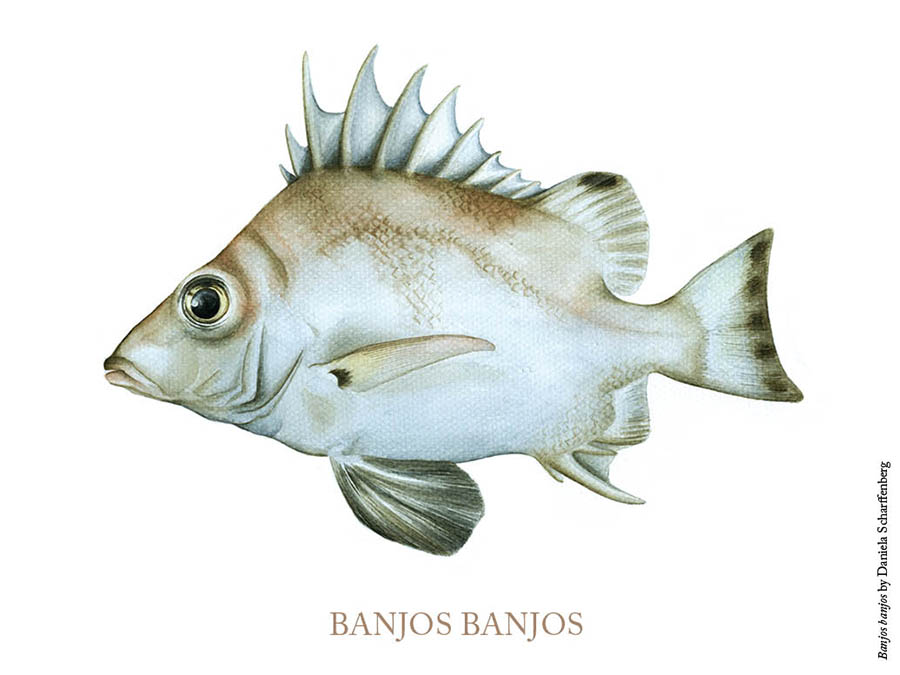

Scientific classification
- Kingdom: Animalia
- Phylum: Chordata
- Class: Actinopterygii
- Order: Acropomatiformes
- Family: Banjosidae
- Genus: Banjos
- Species: B. banjos

Binomial name
- Banjos banjos (J. Richardson, 1846)

Subspecies
- See text

Synonyms
- Anoplus banjos Richardson, 1846; Banjos typus Bleeker, 1876

= Banjos banjos =

Species of fish

Banjos banjos, the banjofish, is a species of marine ray-finned fish from the family Banjosidae. This was formerly considered to be a monotypic family of which the banjofish was the only species. However, in 2017, two new species of banjofish were described, the East Australian banjofish (B. aculeatus) and the Timor Sea banjofish (B. peregrinus). It has an Indo-Pacific distribution.

== Description ==
Banjos banjos has a deep and strongly compressed body with a steep head and an almost straight dorsal profile. The dorsal fin has 10 flattened spines and 12 soft rays while the anal fin has 3 spines with the second being far longer the others, the anal fin also contains 7 soft rays. The caudal fin is slightly emarginate, It has a complete and continuous lateral line. In colour it is silvery white to greyish-brown, fading towards the belly, the anterior part of the head is blackish with whitish lips. The second dorsal fin has a white margin and a sizeable, circular black blotch to the front. The caudal fin has a wide brown submarginal band. Smaller fishes show a number of ill-defined dark stripes on their flanks and a large black spot on the base of the tail. The maximum recorded standard length is 20 centimetres (7.9 in)

== Distribution ==
Banjos banjos is found in the Indo-West Pacific region from the south eastern Indian Ocean off Western Australia through Indonesia and the South China Sea to Japan.

== Habitat and biology ==
Banjos banjos is an inshore species which can be found at depths between 50–400 metres (160–1,310 ft).

== Taxonomy ==
Banjos banjos was first formally described as Anoplus banjos in 1846 by Scottish naval surgeon, naturalist and arctic explorer Sir John Richardson (1797–1865) with the type locality given as the Sea of Japan. B. banjos was previously considered to be the only species in the family Banjosidae but in 2017 Matsunuma & Motomura described two new species, the East Australian banjofish (Banjos acuteatus) and the Timor Sea banjofish (Banjos peregrinus) and a new subspecies of B. banjos (see below).

There are two recognised subspecies of Banjos banjos:

- Banjos banjos banjos (Richardson, 1846) - the nominate subspecies from the western Pacific
- Banjos banjos brevispinis Matsunuma & Motomura, 2017 - from the Indian Ocean, called the Western Australian banjofish.
