= Banjos (fish) =

- Banjos banjos

Scientific classification
- Kingdom: Animalia
- Phylum: Chordata
- Class: Actinopterygii
- Clade: Eupercaria
- Order: Acropomatiformes
- Family: Banjosidae; D.S. Jordan and W.F. Thompson, 1912
- Genus: Banjos; Bleeker, 1876

Type species
- Anoplus banjos Richardson, 1846

Species
- see text

Synonyms
- Anoplus Temminck & Schlegel, 1843

Genus of ray-finned fishes

Banjos is a genus of marine ray-finned fish, the only genus in the monotypic family Banjosidae, which is part of the order Acropomatiformes. They are native to the western Indian and the Atlantic coasts of Africa, and is made up of the three species of banjofishes.

== Species ==
Banjos have three currently recognised species:

- Banjos aculeatus Matsunuma & Motomura, 2017 (Eastern Australian banjofish)
- Banjos banjos (John Richardson, 1846) (Banjofish)
- Banjos peregrinus Matsunuma & Motomura, 2017 (Timor Sea banjofish)
