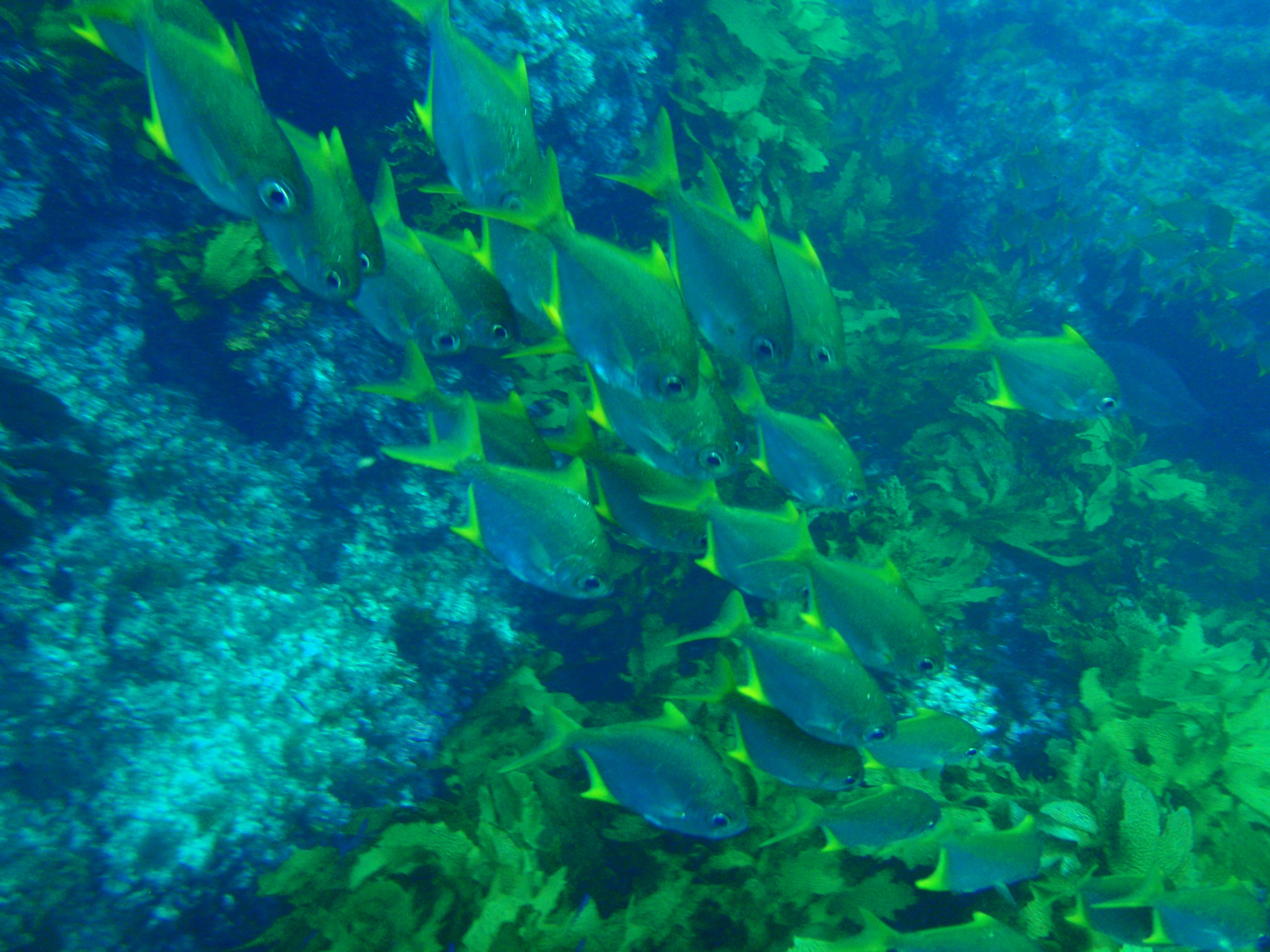
- Woodward's pomfret, Schuettea woodwardi

Scientific classification
- Kingdom: Animalia
- Phylum: Chordata
- Class: Actinopterygii
- Order: Acropomatiformes
- Genus: Schuettea; Steindachner, 1866

Type species
- Schuettea scalaripinnis Steindachner, 1866

Synonyms
- Bramichthys Waite, 1905

= Schuettea =

Genus of fishes

Schuettea is a genus of marine ray-finned fishes native to Australia. They are commonly referred to as "pomfrets" but are not closely related to true pomfrets of the Bramidae.

Their taxonomic status is currently uncertain; they were formerly placed as the only other extant genus of the family Monodactylidae, but more recent phylogenetic studies suggests they belong to the order Acropomatiformes as an incertae sedis member. They are not yet assigned to a family.

== Species ==
There are currently two recognized species in this genus:

- Schuettea scalaripinnis Steindachner, 1866 (eastern pomfret)
- Schuettea woodwardi (Waite, 1905) (Woodward's pomfret)
