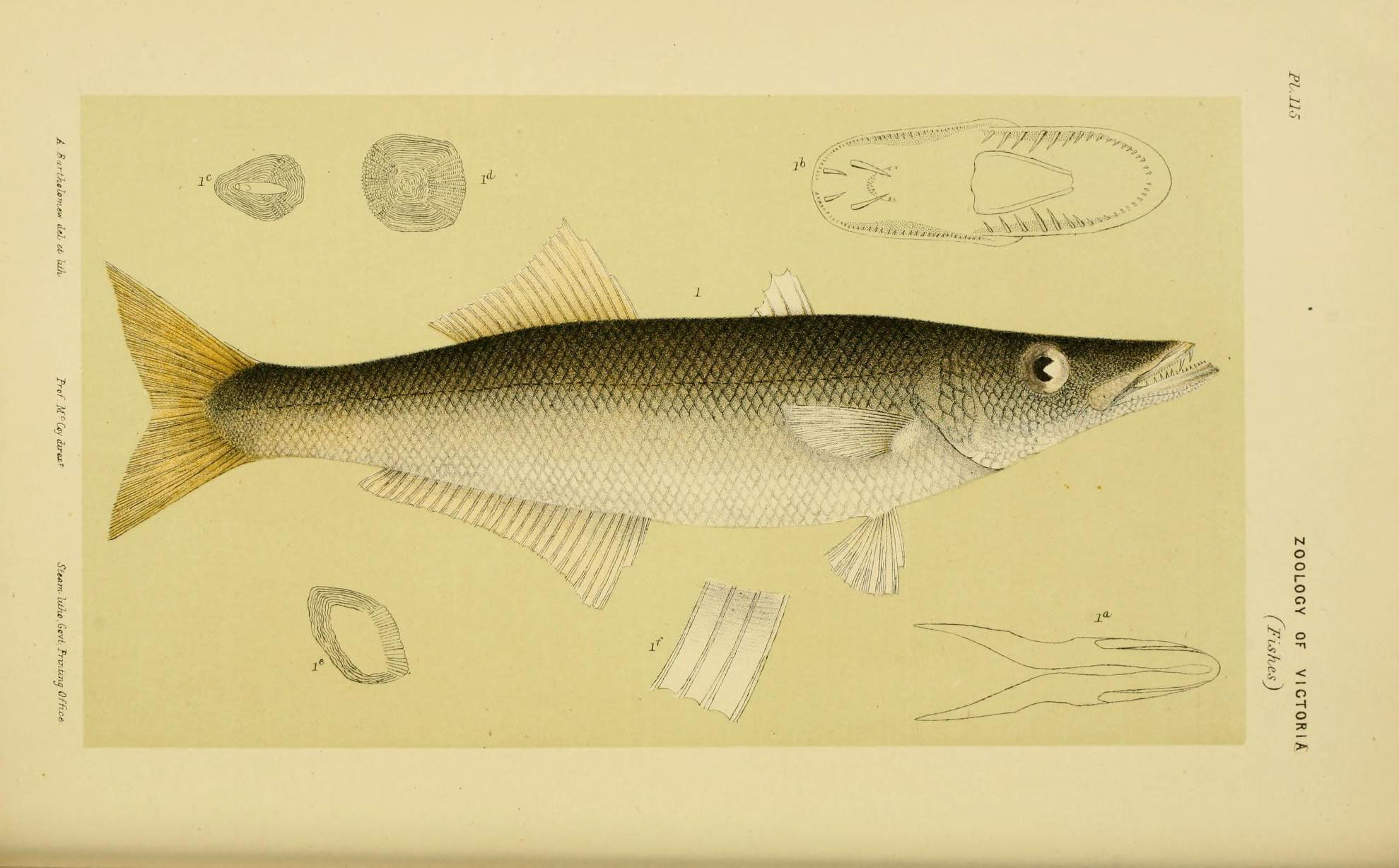

Scientific classification
- Kingdom: Animalia
- Phylum: Chordata
- Class: Actinopterygii
- Order: Acropomatiformes
- Family: Dinolestidae; T. D. Scott, 1962
- Genus: Dinolestes; Klunzinger, 1872
- Species: D. lewini

Binomial name
- Dinolestes lewini (E. Griffith & C. H. Smith, 1834)

Synonyms
- Esox lewini E. Griffith & C. H. Smith, 1834; Neosphyraena multiradiata Castelnau, 1872; Lanioperca mordax Günther,1872; Dinolestes muelleri Klunzinger, 1872

= Long-finned pike =

Species of ray-finned fish

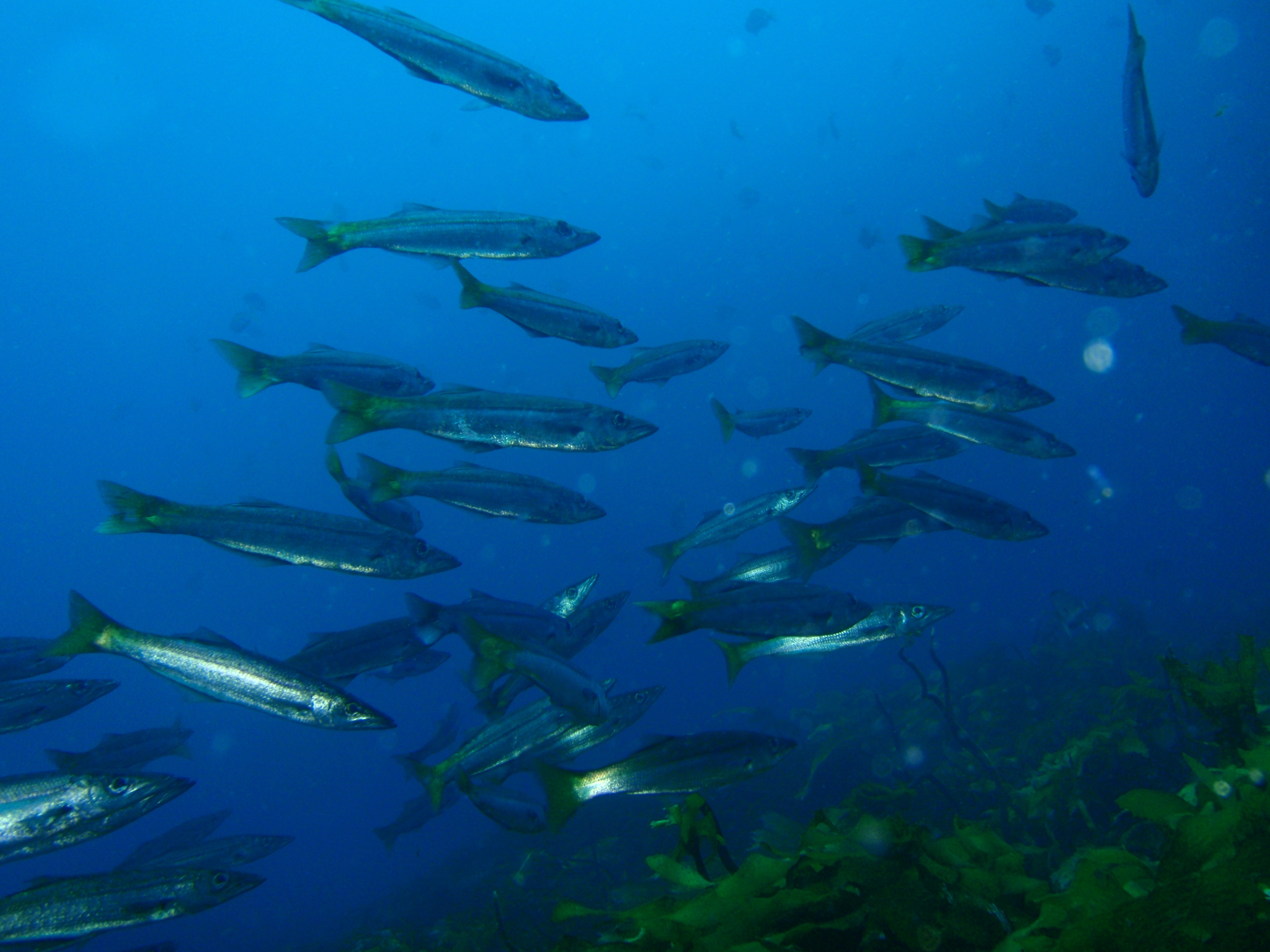
A school of long-finned pike

The long-finned pike or yellowfin pike (Dinolestes lewini) is a species of acropomatiform ray-finned fish, the only species in the genus Dinolestes, as well as the family Dinolestidae.

It is an elongated fish with a pointed snout, and silver in color, similar in appearance to a barracuda, and grows up to 84 cm (33 in) in total length. It is endemic to the coastal waters of southern Australia, including New South Wales, at depths between 5 and 65 m (16 and 213 ft).

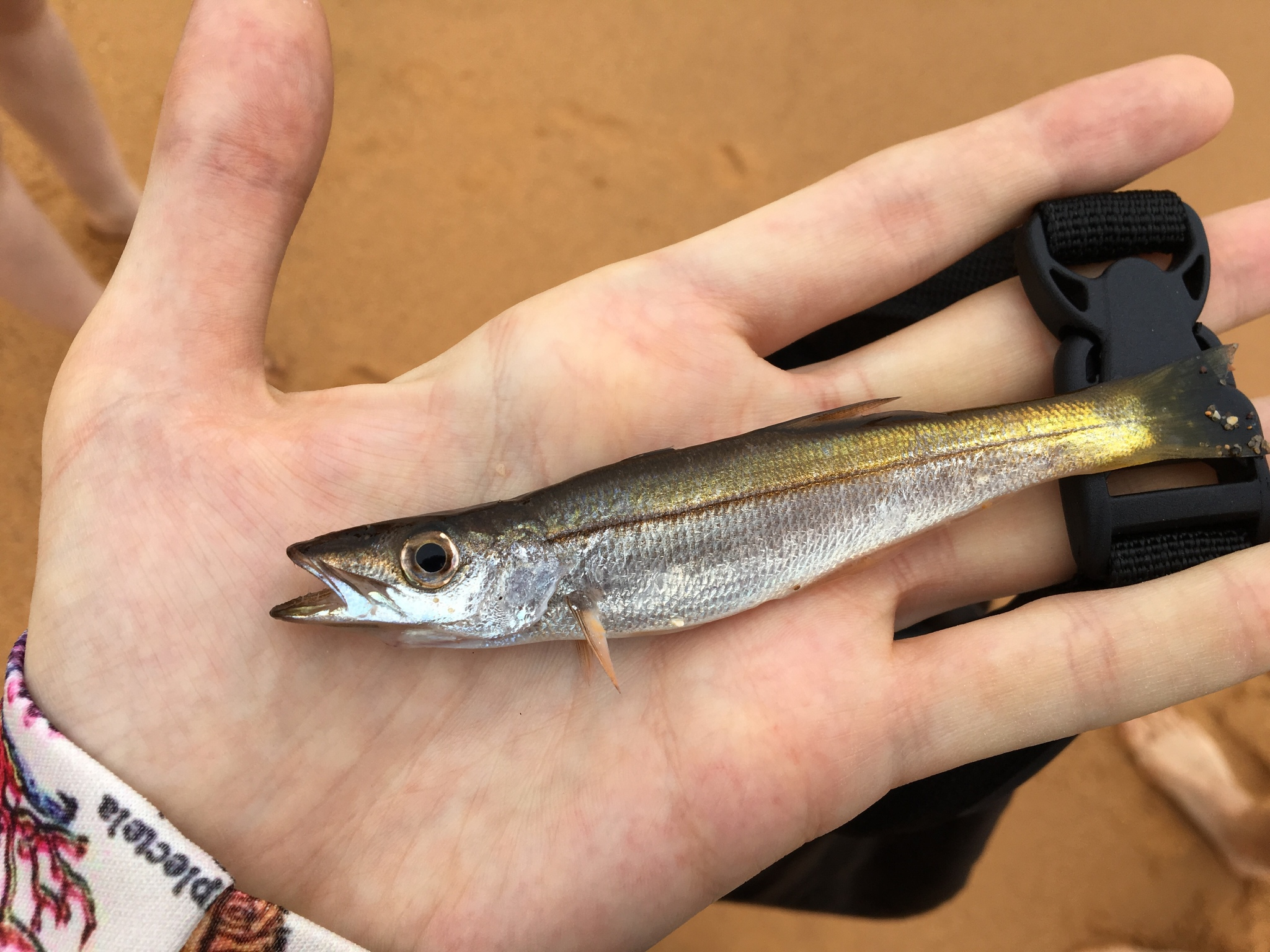
Juvenile specimen

== See also ==
- List of fish families
