= Ostracoberyx =

Ostracoberyx Temporal range: 55.5–0 Ma Eocene to Recent

Scientific classification
- Kingdom: Animalia
- Phylum: Chordata
- Class: Actinopterygii
- Order: Acropomatiformes
- Family: Ostracoberycidae; Fowler, 1934
- Genus: Ostracoberyx; Fowler, 1934

Type species
- Ostracoberyx dorygenys Fowler, 1934

Genus of ray-finned fishes

Ostracoberyx is a genus of shellskin alfonsinos, the only recognized genus in the family Ostracoberycidae. This is a genus of deep-water fishes native to the Indian and western Pacific oceans.

== Species ==
There are currently three recognized species in this genus:

- Ostracoberyx dorygenys Fowler, 1934
- Ostracoberyx fowleri Matsubara, 1939
- Ostracoberyx paxtoni Quéro & Ozouf-Costaz, 1991 (Spinycheek seabass)
