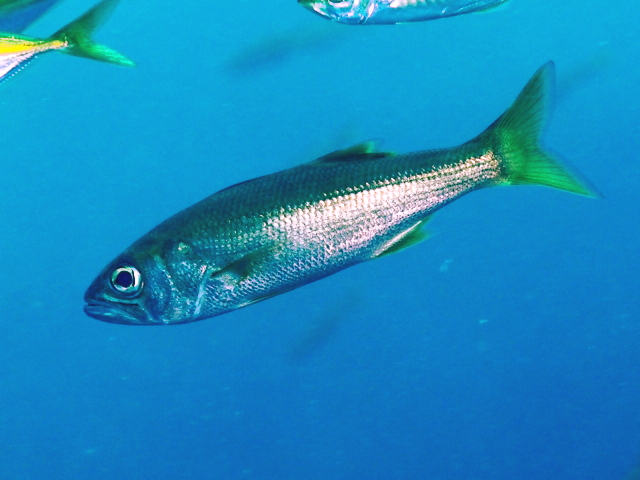

Scientific classification
- Kingdom: Animalia
- Phylum: Chordata
- Class: Actinopterygii
- Order: Acropomatiformes
- Family: Scombropidae
- Genus: Scombrops
- Species: S. boops

Binomial name
- Scombrops boops (Houttuyn, 1782)

Synonyms
- Labrus boops Houttuyn, 1782; Scombrops cheilodipteroides Bleeker, 1853; Scombrops dubius Gilchrist, 1922

= Scombrops boops =

Species of fish

Scombrops boops is a species of marine ray-finned fish, a gnomefish from the family Scombropidae in the suborder Percoidei. This species is the most widespread of the Scombropidae, which consists of only four extant species globally. Most of the information about the Scombropidae family is unknown, as they are rarely researched.

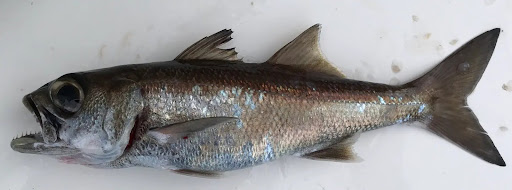
Scombrops boops, photographed by Uzidal on 1/17/2021

== Species description ==
While Scombrops boops vary in color, the most common color for adults is black, while juveniles are usually a dusky silver. It grows to a maximum total length of 150 centimetres (59 in) and a maximum published weight of 16.1 kilograms (35 lb). Adults commonly have 9-10 total dorsal spines, 13-14 soft dorsal rays, 3 anal spines, and 12-13 soft anal rays. Scombrops boops have a compressed body, cycloid (smooth, thin, and round) scales, and knife-like teeth.

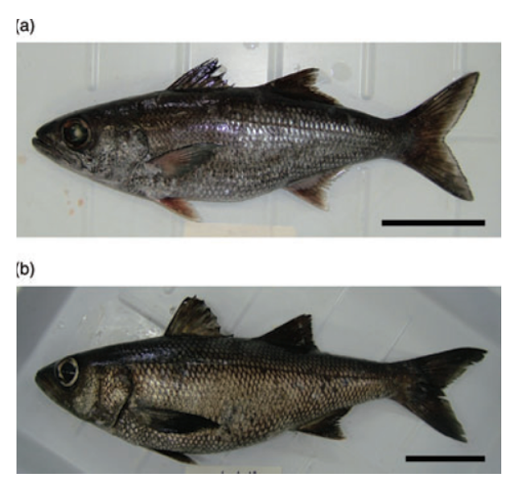
Morphological comparison of S. boops (a) and S. gilberti (b) from “Species identification method for Scombrops boops and Scombrops gilberti based on polymerase chain reaction-restriction fragment length polymorphism analysis of mitochondrial DNA” Itoi et al. 2008.

This species is often confused with two other fish from the family Scombropidae, S. gilberti and S. dubius, due to their visual similarities. This results from their close phylogenetic relationship; however, these species have been proven to be all distinct species within the Scombropidae family. Morphologically, S. boops and S. gilberti differ in that S. boops has a lower number of scales and fewer scales on the lateral line. S. boops also has a larger overall count of gill rakers compared to S. gilberti. With respect to the two species’ genomes, S. boops and S. gilberti were found to have different mitochondrial DNA sequences in certain parts of their genomes and therefore are considered distinct species. Additionally, S. boops and S. gilberti vary in both weight and length. S. boops is smaller compared to S. gilberti in both categories during the first 2 years after spawning; however, S. gilberti eventually grows to be longer and heavier 3 years after spawning.

Comparing the otolith (ear-bone) weight and the standard length relative to age also determined that S. boops and S. gilberti differ in their species-specific growth patterns.

Gene sequences in S. boops and S. dubius also differ, and it was found that the African gnomefish is about 96% identical to its Japanese counterpart, but is still varied enough to be considered a distinct species.

== Geographic range ==
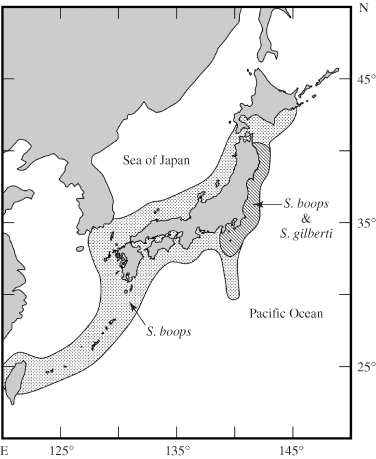
Geographical distribution of S. boops and S. gilberti in Japan from “Distribution and species composition of juvenile and adult Scombropids (Teleostei, Scombropidae) in Japanese coastal waters” Itoi et al. 2010

It is found in the Indo-West Pacific–specifically the Japanese Archipelago–and marginally in the southeastern Atlantic. The southernmost detection of this species in the Indo-West Pacific range is Hong Kong, consisting of juveniles from the Japanese Archipelago that spawned and followed the current southward. It occurs off South Africa, Mozambique, and in the East and South China Sea. The geographical distribution of S. boops is dependent on their age and spawning habits.

== Spawning and habitat ==
Adults inhabit deep rocky waters ranging from depths of 200-700 meters, while the juveniles are found in shallow waters near-shore and in kelp forest bedding. The spawning ground for S. boops often consists of algal habitats, specifically kelp or Sargassum. Spawning occurs during the winter season from October to March, most commonly on the continental shelf of the East China Sea. The Kuroshio and Tsushima currents transport the eggs, larvae, hatchlings, and juveniles from the East China Sea to the Izu Islands of Japan, which act as a nursery for this species of gnomefish. The small population of S. boops found along the Hong Kong coast have similarly spawned in the East China Sea continental shelf and were then transported through the Taiwan Strait. During March and May, after the spawning season has completed, juveniles opt for algal habitats, which coincides with the peak Sargassum growth season in Hong Kong, explaining their presence. However, these algal habitats are only transient habitats for juveniles of the species before they make their descent to the rocky disphotic layer as adults.

== Growth ==
The growth of S. boops can be monitored through otolith reading and measuring standard length. As otolith size grows, standard length grows throughout the species’ lifespan. Rapid growth for the species occurs seasonally, with the most growth occurring from September to January.

== Feeding habits ==
The feeding habits for S. boops depend on its age class. Juveniles are relatively small and mostly eat copepods and decapod larvae until they reach 40 millimeters in length. As they grow to 40-50 millimeters long, they start to consume clupeoid larvae exclusively. When S. boops grow greater than 50 millimeters long, they start to consume young clupeoides such as herring and anchovy. S. boops with body length ranging from 50-70 millimeters feed the most intensely and usually on adult clupeoides. Larger members of the species, above 180 millimeters in total length, feed primarily on adult fishes in the Apogonidae family.

== Predation, competition, and parasitism ==
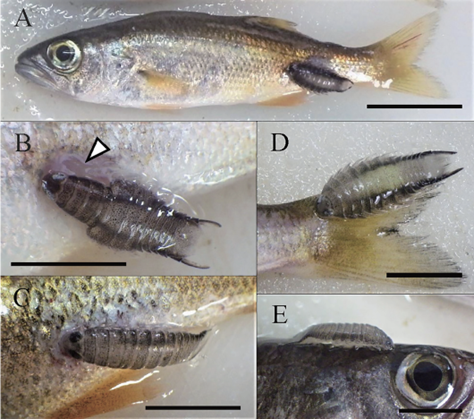
S. boops infection by Nerocila phaiopleura on the lateral hind-end of the body (A-C), the caudal peduncle (D), and the dorsal area of the head (E). From “The cymothoid isopod Nerocila phaiopleura parasitic on gnomefish, Scombrops boops, in coastal Pacific waters of central Japan, with an updated list of the hosts reported from Japan” Isozaki and Nagasawa, 2020.

Predation and competition interactions for this fish species are largely unknown; however, the species has a common parasite, Nerocila phaiopleura. This parasitic isopod latches almost exclusively to the lateral hind-end of S. boops, often creating skin wounds that become infected. While competition for S. boops is unknown, they coexist with S. gilberti. This interspecific relationship could result from the geographical separation of spawning and nursery grounds for these two fish. S. boops only uses the Izu Islands as a nursery (raising juveniles), after spawning fry in the East China Sea. Inversely, S. gilberti only spawns in the Izu Islands region, with juveniles dispersing elsewhere.

== Human impact and conservation status ==
The conservation status of this species, as well as the imminent or future threats, remain unevaluated. While information about cultural importance and existing fisheries are unknown for this species, they are commonly found in Japanese marketplaces and are referred to as commercial fish by various studies due to their large body size when fully grown. In these marketplaces, S. boops and S. gilberti are often confused due to their similar appearance.
