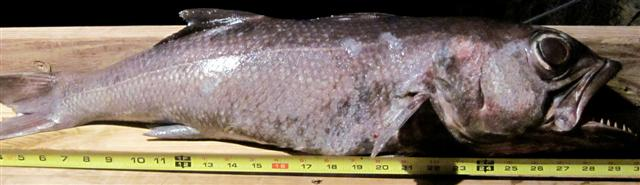

Scientific classification
- Kingdom: Animalia
- Phylum: Chordata
- Class: Actinopterygii
- Order: Acropomatiformes
- Family: Scombropidae
- Genus: Scombrops
- Species: S. oculatus

Binomial name
- Scombrops oculatus (Poey, 1860)

Synonyms
- Latebrus oculatus Poey, 1860

= Scombrops oculatus =

Species of fish

Scombrops oculatus, the Atlantic scombrops, is a species of marine ray-finned fish, a gnomefish from the family Scombropidae. It is found in the Western Atlantic Ocean.

== Description ==
Scombrops oculatus has an oblong shaped body which is laterally compressed with large eyes and a large mouth which terminates under the centreline of the eye. The upper jaw is not protrusible and has a sizeable additional bone over its posterior end. The posterior bone of the upper jaw is enlarged at its rear and much of it is exposed when the mouth is closed. The mouth is equipped with large teeth shaped like compressed canines which are well separated and arranged in 1–2 rows along the sides of the roof of the mouth with a patch of smaller teeth in the middle. The margin of the preopercle is smooth and the rear of the gill cover has two flattened points. The dorsal fins are high, obviously separate and have seven weak spines in the first dorsal fin and 1 weak spine and 14 soft rays in the second dorsal fin, The anal fin has three weak spines and twelve soft rays. The caudal fin is forked while the pectoral fins are short, equivalent to roughly about half the length of the head. The adults are predominantly black in colour, the juveniles are silvery. The maximum recorded total length is 150 centimetres (59 in) while the maximum published weight is 16.1 kilograms (35 lb).

== Distribution ==
Scombrops oculatus is known only from the Western Atlantic but it may have a circumtropical distribution. It has mainly been recorded from the Straits of Florida and the western Bahamas, but this species has a wide distribution in the tropical western Atlantic.

== Habitat and biology ==
Scombrops oculatus occurs over rocky bottoms at depths of 20 to 610 metres (66 to 2,001 ft), although it is normally found deeper than 200 metres (660 ft). It is a benthic or near benthic species which feeds on crustaceans, cephalopods and other fishes. It lays pelagic eggs and the larvae are pelagic too.

== Species description ==
Scombrops oculatus was first formally described in 1860 as Latebrus oculatus by the Cuban zoologist Felipe Poey (1799–1891) with the type locality given as Cuba.
