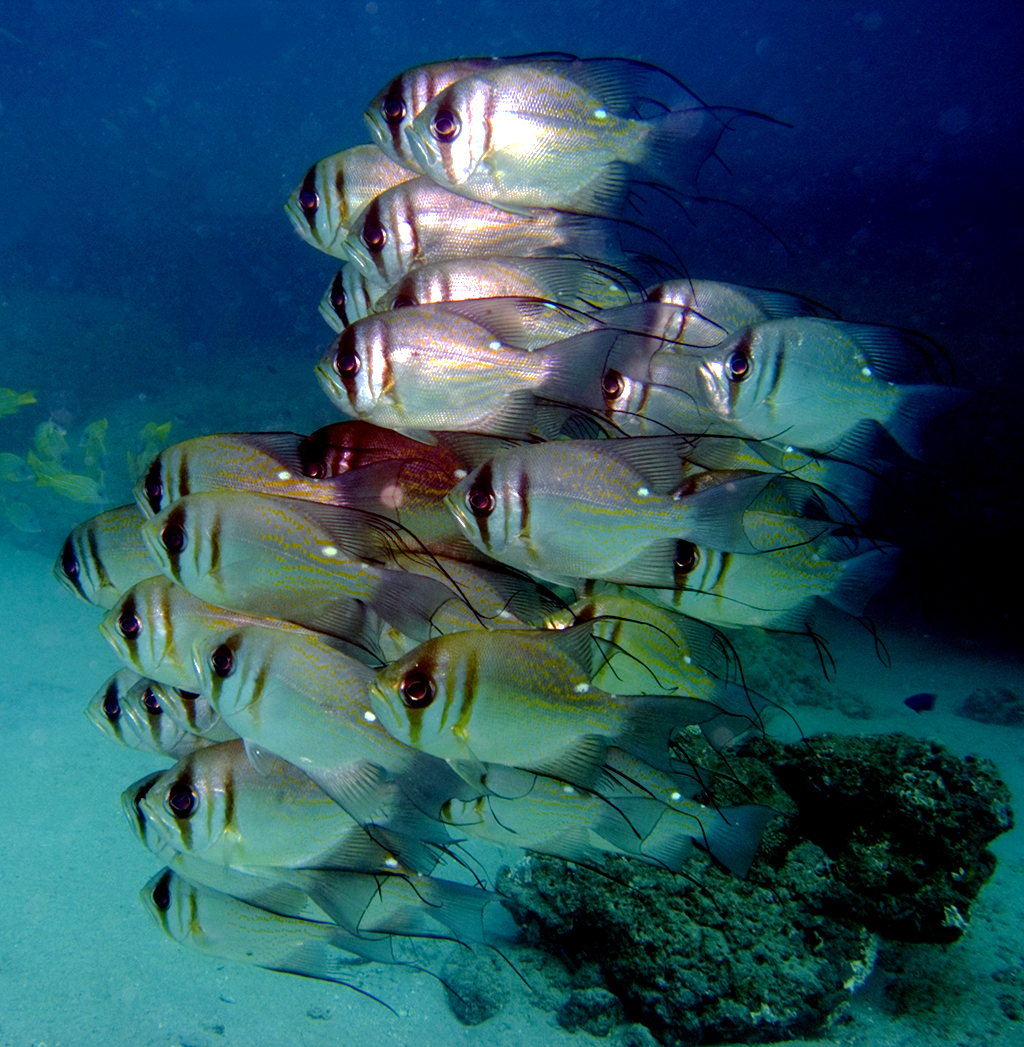
- Glaucosoma magnificum

Scientific classification
- Kingdom: Animalia
- Phylum: Chordata
- Class: Actinopterygii
- Clade: Eupercaria
- Order: Acropomatiformes
- Family: Glaucosomatidae; D. S. Jordan, 1923
- Genus: Glaucosoma; Temminck & Schlegel, 1843

Type species
- Glaucosoma buergeri J. Richardson, 1845

= Glaucosoma =

Genus of ray-finned fishes

Glaucosoma, the pearl perches, are ray-finned fishes native to the Indian Ocean waters around Australia and the western Pacific Ocean. This genus is currently the only one assigned to the family Glaucosomatidae.

== Species ==
The currently recognized species in this genus are:

- Glaucosoma buergeri J. Richardson, 1845 (deepsea jewfish)
- Glaucosoma hebraicum J. Richardson, 1845 (Westralian dhufish)
- Glaucosoma magnificum (J. D. Ogilby, 1915) (threadfin pearl-perch)
- Glaucosoma scapulare E. P. Ramsay, 1881 (pearl perch)

== See also ==
- List of fish families
