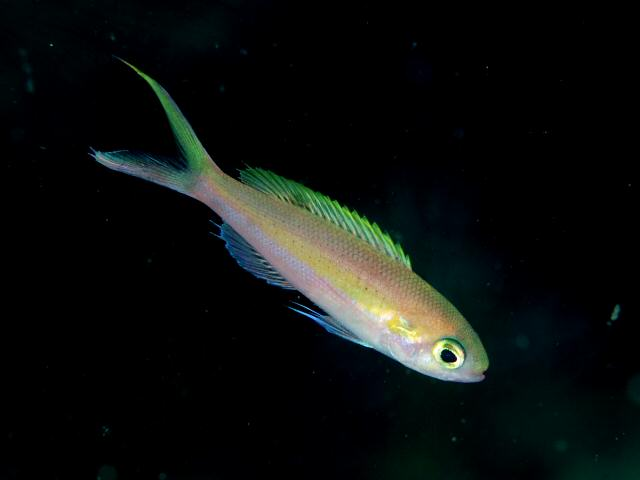
- Symphysanodon katayamai

Scientific classification
- Kingdom: Animalia
- Phylum: Chordata
- Class: Actinopterygii
- Order: Acropomatiformes
- Family: Symphysanodontidae
- Genus: Symphysanodon; Bleeker, 1878

Species
- See text

= Symphysanodon =

Genus of ray-finned fishes

Symphysanodon, also known as the slopefishes, is a genus of small marine ray-finned fishes. Most are found in the Indo-Pacific, but three species, S. berryi, S. mona, and S. octoactinus, are found in the Western Atlantic. They are found on rocky reefs at depths of 50–700 m (160–2,300 ft). Traditionally, this genus is the only member of the family Symphysanodontidae, but in 2017 a new species, C. aureolateralis, was placed in its own genus Cymatognathus.

== Description ==
The largest species of Symphysanodon can reach 20 cm (7.9 in) in length. Their bodies are slender and compressed, with blunt snouts. They are red, pink, oranges or yellow in colour. The caudal fin is usually distinctively forked. The dorsal fins have 9 dorsal spines and 10 soft rays, whereas the anal fin has three anal spines and seven or eight soft rays.

== Species ==
There are currently 12 recognized species in this genus:

- Symphysanodon andersoni Kotthaus, 1974 (Buck-toothed slopefish)
- Symphysanodon berryi W. D. Anderson, 1970 (Slope bass)
- Symphysanodon disii Khalaf & Krupp, 2008 (Disi's slopefish)
- Symphysanodon katayamai W. D. Anderson, 1970 (Yellow-stripe slopefish)
- Symphysanodon maunaloae W. D. Anderson, 1970 (Long-tailed slopefish)
- Symphysanodon mona W. D. Anderson & V. G. Springer, 2005 (Akarnax slopefish)
- Symphysanodon octoactinus W. D. Anderson, 1970 (Insular slopefish)
- Symphysanodon parini W. D. Anderson & V. G. Springer, 2005 (Sala y Gómez slopefish)
- Symphysanodon pitondelafournaisei Quéro, Spitz & Vayne, 2009 (Réunion slopefish)
- Symphysanodon rhax W. D. Anderson & V. G. Springer, 2005 (Maldives slopefish)
- Symphysanodon typus Bleeker, 1878 (Insular shelfbeauty)
- Symphysanodon xanthopterygion W. D. Anderson & Bineesh, 2011 (Indian slopefish)
