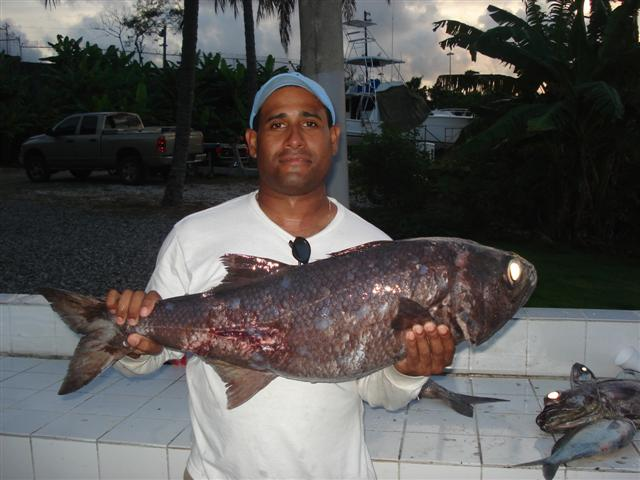
- Scombrops oculatus, Atlantic gnomefish

Scientific classification
- Kingdom: Animalia
- Phylum: Chordata
- Class: Actinopterygii
- Order: Acropomatiformes
- Family: Scombropidae; Gill, 1862
- Genus: Scombrops; Temminck & Schlegel, 1845

Type species
- Scombrops cheilodipteroides Bleeker, 1853

Species
- See text

= Gnomefish =

Gnomefish Temporal range: Early Eocene to Present

Family of ray-finned fishes

The gnomefishes form a small family, Scombropidae, consisting of three extant species of marine ray-finned fish in the genus Scombrops. They have two dorsal fins and are notable for scales covering the soft parts of the dorsal and anal fins. The eyes are large. The gnomefish, S. boops, lives in deep rocky areas, down to 400 m. It can grow to 150 cm total length and 16 kg weight.

S. gilberti occurs in the western Pacific including Japan. The Atlantic scombrops, S. oculatus, is widely found in the subtropical western Atlantic, particularly the Florida and Bahamas area. It is a deepwater fish, caught by anglers between 200 and 610 m.

== Species ==
The following species are classified within the genus Scombrops:

- Scombrops boops (Houttuyn, 1782)
- Scombrops gilberti (Jordan & Snyder, 1901)
- Scombrops oculatus (Poey, 1860)

The Scombropidae have been put forward as the sister taxon to the Pempheridae by some authorities.
