= Myvanwy M. Dick =

British-American zoologist and curator (1910–1993)

Myvanwy Millar Dick
- Born: Myvanwy Millar; 1910; Birmingham, England
- Died: 1993 (aged 82–83); Sarasota, Florida, US
- Scientific career
- Fields: Ichthyology
- Institutions: Museum of Comparative Zoology at Harvard University

Myvanwy Millar Dick (1910 – March 1993) was a British-born American zoologist and curator at the Museum of Comparative Zoology at Harvard University, where she collaborated with Thomas Barbour, Henry Bryant Bigelow, and Alfred Romer.

Born outside Birmingham, England, and of Welsh descent, Myvanwy Millar moved to the United States in 1930, where she trained as an artist and married a tree surgeon, George M. Dick, in 1939. In 1946, she joined the Harvard Museum of Comparative Zoology as an art assistant, rising through the ranks to become a research assistant, laboratory assistant, curatorial assistant, and curator before retiring in 1976.

Dick specialized in ichthyology (the study of fish) and belonged to the American Society of Ichthyologists and Herpetologists for more than 40 years. In 1990, she established the Myvanwy Dick Award for most innovative student paper in ichthyology. Throughout her career, she assisted scientific researchers, maintained collections of specimens, and published several scientific papers, including a study of bony fishes and a comprehensive survey of the Thayer Expedition.
