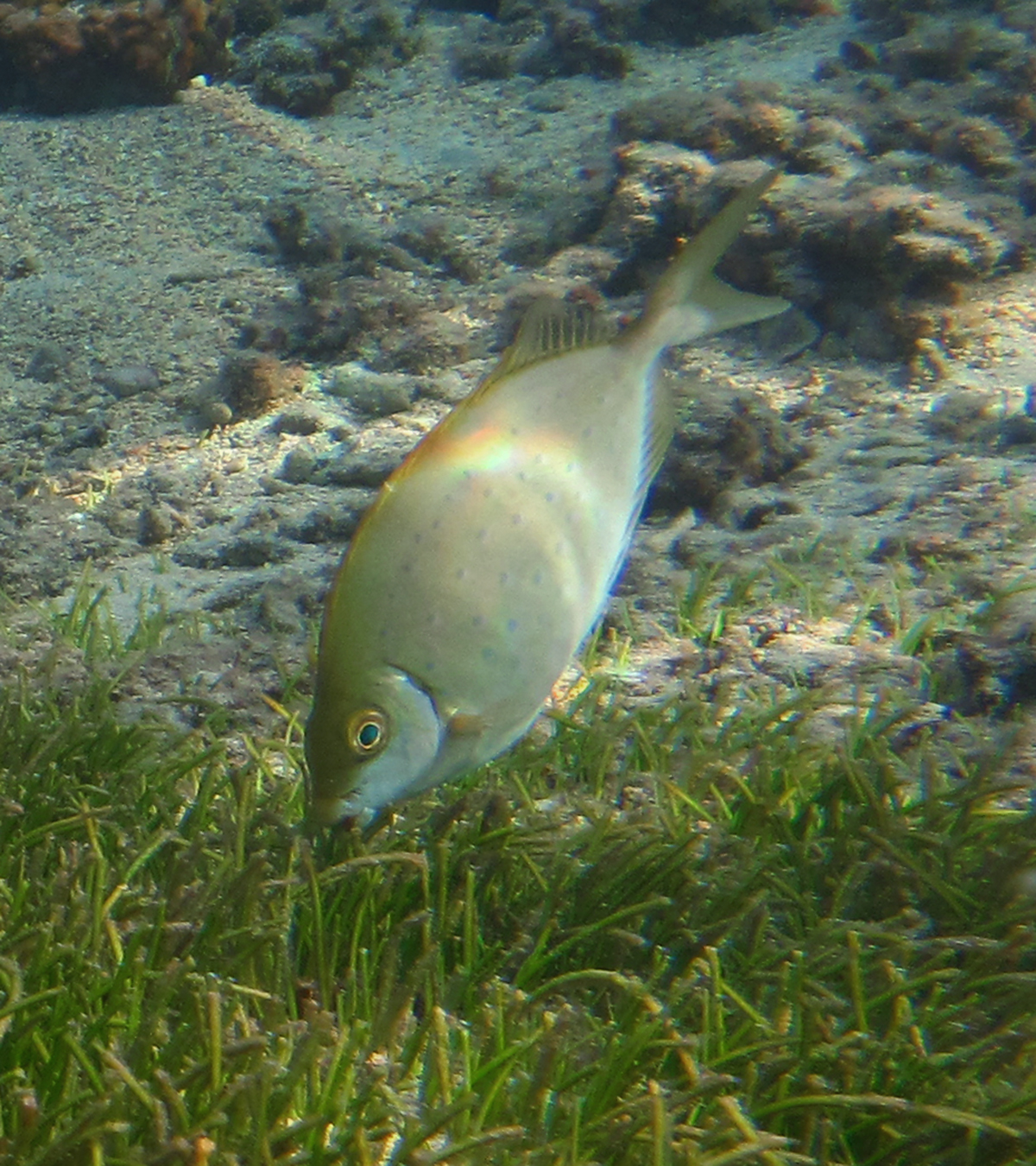

Conservation status
- Least Concern (IUCN 3.1)

Scientific classification
- Kingdom: Animalia
- Phylum: Chordata
- Class: Actinopterygii
- Order: Acanthuriformes
- Family: Siganidae
- Genus: Siganus
- Species: S. sutor

Binomial name
- Siganus sutor (Valenciennes, 1835)

Synonyms
- Amphacanthus sutor Valenciennes, 1835; Buro brunneus Lacépède, 1803; Amphacanthus abhortani Valenciennes, 1835; Teuthis abhortani (Valenciennes, 1835); Amphacanthus olivaceus Valenciennes, 1835

= Siganus sutor =

Species of fish

Siganus sutor, the shoemaker spinefoot rabbitfish ,whitespotted rabbitfish or African whitespotted rabbitfish, is a species of marine ray-finned fish, a rabbitfish belonging to the family Siganidae. It lives in Indo-Pacific coral reefs. It is endemic to the Indian Ocean, from Indonesia to Comoros. S. sutor is one of the commercial marine fishes, which is ubiquitously caught in Tanzania and the entire East African coast of the Indian Ocean. S. sutor is among the most common fish species in the marine fisheries of Kenya, and accounts for around 40% of the artisanal fishery landings. Various fishing gears are used to target the siganids, but basket traps are the preferred ones. It is one of the mangrove/seagrass-associated coral reef fishes. This species inhabits littoral areas, and its fin spines are venomous to humans.

== Taxonomy ==
Siganus sutor was first formally described in 1835 as Amphacanthus sutor by the French zoologist Achilles Valenciennes, with the type locality given as the Seychelles. The specific name sutor means "cobbler" or "shoemaker", a reference to the local name given to this species in the Seychelles and Mauritius; and cordonnier means a "shoemaker", being a name for rabbitfishes in the Seychellois Creole and Mauritian Creole languages. Valenciennes did not explain this, but it is thought to refer to the sharp spines of these fishes which may have been used to puncture leather, like an awl.

== Description ==
Siganus sutor has a maximum reported age of 3 years.

The color patterns of the fish extend to the fins. During the daytime, the body of the S. sutor is usually a silver color with white spots. Sometimes there would be blue spots within the white spots. During night time, the fish has a mottled green or grey color. Siganus sutor has the ability to immediately change between these two color patterns.

The spines of the Siganids are slender, pungent and venomous. Venom glands in the spines can cause great pain but are unlikely to be fatal to a healthy adult.

S. sutor has a total of 13-14 dorsal spines, 10 dorsal soft rays, 7 anal spines, 9-10 anal soft rays and 23 vertebrae. The long flap of the anterior nostril shortens as the fish ages.

== Distribution and habitat ==
Siganus sutor occurs in the Western Indian Ocean off East Africa, from Somalia to South Africa, and around the islands of Madagascar, Réunion, Mauritius, the Comoros Islands, Rodrigues, as well as in the Gulf of Aden off Yemen. Records elsewhere require confirmation. It is found at depths between 1 and 12 m (3 ft 3 in and 39 ft 4 in) in inshore areas and on inner reefs. It is frequently recorded in beds of seagrass.

== Behavior ==
Siganus sutor shows diurnal schooling behavior and feeds in shallow water habitats. They inhabit in inshore areas, particularly in seagrass beds and coral reefs (when they are adults). The depth range of the living habitat is from 1m to 50m, but usually from 1m to 12 m. When S. sutor is threatened, it will raise its dorsal fin for protection. Also, S. sutor returns to the same offshore coral patch reef aggregation site to spawn on subsequent full moons, migrating at most 3.3 km from fishing grounds closer to shore.

== Diet and feeding feature ==
Siganus sutor is an herbivore, which feeds mainly on macro-algae. It is a diurnal feeder, but it is often seen out in the open sea on night dives off the Tanzanian coast.

== Venom and treatment ==
This species produces venom in the spines of its fins. In a study of the venom of a congener it was found that rabbitfish venom was similar to the venom of stonefishes. If a person is envenomated by the spines of Siganus sutor, the treatment is to use hot water (as hot as one can take) for 60 to 90 minutes.

== Parasitism ==
Siganus sutors are likely to have gill parasites, such as the monogeneans Psedohaliotrema sp., Tetrancistrum sigani and Microcotyle mouwoi, the copepods Hatschekia sp., Psedolepeophtheirus sp. and juvenile Caligidae, and prazina larvae of the isopod Gnathia sp. Compare to the subadults, adult siganids would have higher parasite load, and the juvenile siganids do not have any gill parasites.

== Reproduction ==
The two spawning seasons for Siganus sutor are January/February and May/June.The presence of these seasons is determined by three factors: temporal changes in the condition factor and relative weight of the gonads, the progression of peaks of maturity stages with seasonal presence of spent fish in the samples, and the seasonal appearance of juveniles.

== Related research ==
Siganus sutor and two other fish species (Lethrinus harak and Rastrelliger kanagurta) had been used to study the bioaccumulation of heavy metals in marine fishes from Dar es Salaam Tanzania. Researchers had assessed the potential risks to human health and the suitability of the fishes' fins as a non-destructive monitoring organ. The results showed that fins were not suitable as non-destructive monitoring organs for most metals. The levels of metal intake of aluminum, cadmium, copper, iron, lead and zinc in the muscles of the Siganus sutor were below the FAO/WHO maximum levels for contaminants and toxins in food for human consumption.

== Existing management regulations ==
Wildlife Conservation Society, Kenya Marine and Fisheries Research Institute and State Department of Fisheries have promoted modification of the basket trap by adding an escape gap to help reduce the by-catch, which then allows the juveniles and small-sized fish to swim out of the trap.
