= Acropomatiformes =

Acropomatiformes Temporal range: Maastrichtian–recent
- Banjos banjos

Scientific classification
- Kingdom: Animalia
- Phylum: Chordata
- Class: Actinopterygii
- Clade: Eupercaria
- Order: Acropomatiformes; Davis, Sparks & Smith, 2016

Order of ray-finned fishes

The Acropomatiformes or Pempheriformes are an order of fish from the group of perch relatives Percomorpha. The relationship of the families assigned to the Acropomatiformes is based on molecular biological studies and is not yet supported by morphological characteristics.

The giant sea bass (Stereolepis gigas) of the Eastern Pacific Ocean, with a maximum length of 2.5 m (8.2 ft) and weight of 256 kg (564 lb), is the largest species of the Pempheriformes.

As early as 2007, Smith and Craig established a relationship between the wreckfish Polyprionidae, the longfin pike Dinolestes lewini, the armored heads Pentacerotidae and the lanternbellies Acropomatidae. In February 2009, Blaise Li and colleagues described a monophyletic clade composed of the Howellidae, the Lateolabracidae and the deep-sea cardinalfishes Epigonidae in their analysis of the relationships between the various groups of the Acanthomorpha.

In a revision of the bony fish systematics published in early 2013 by Ricardo Betancur-R. and colleagues, an order Pempheriformes with a total of 14 families was introduced as a new order of the perch-like family Percomorphaceae. The families assigned to this order previously belonged to the order of the perch-like family Perciformes. However, with the advent of cladistics and the method of DNA comparison for relationship analysis, it became clear that the Perciformes do not represent a monophylum. In October 2015, two and in October 2018 four more families were added, so that the order Pempheriformes comprises a total of 20 fish families at the end of 2018. Davis, Sparks and Smith changed the name of the order to Acropomatiformes in 2016, which was adopted by FishBase and Eschmeyer's Catalog of Fishes, two online databases on the systematics of fish.

The earliest known records of this group are fossil otoliths assigned to Pempheridae from the Maastrichtian of the United States, Acropoma otoliths from the middle Paleocene of Denmark, and epigonid otoliths ("Epigonidarum") from the mid-late Paleocene of Ukraine. Complete fossil specimens of Acropoma are known from the Early Eocene of Italy (Monte Bolca).

== Lifestyle ==
All species of Acropomatiformes live in the sea, some also live in brackish water, no species lives in fresh water. Numerous species of Acropomatiformes have the ability to bioluminescence. This ability has arisen four to five times independently within the Acropomatiformes.

== Systematics ==
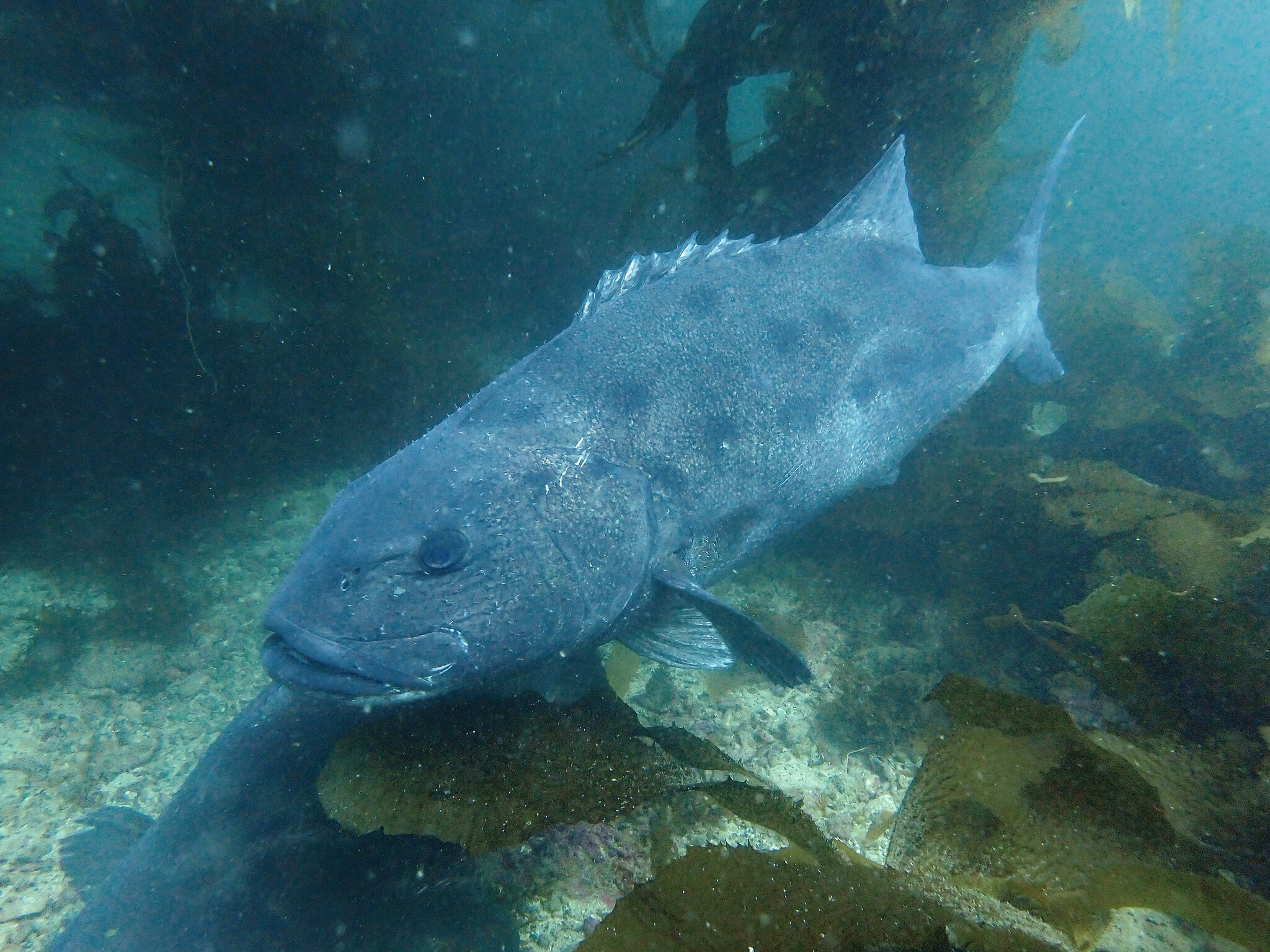
Stereolepis gigas, the largest of the Acropomatiformes

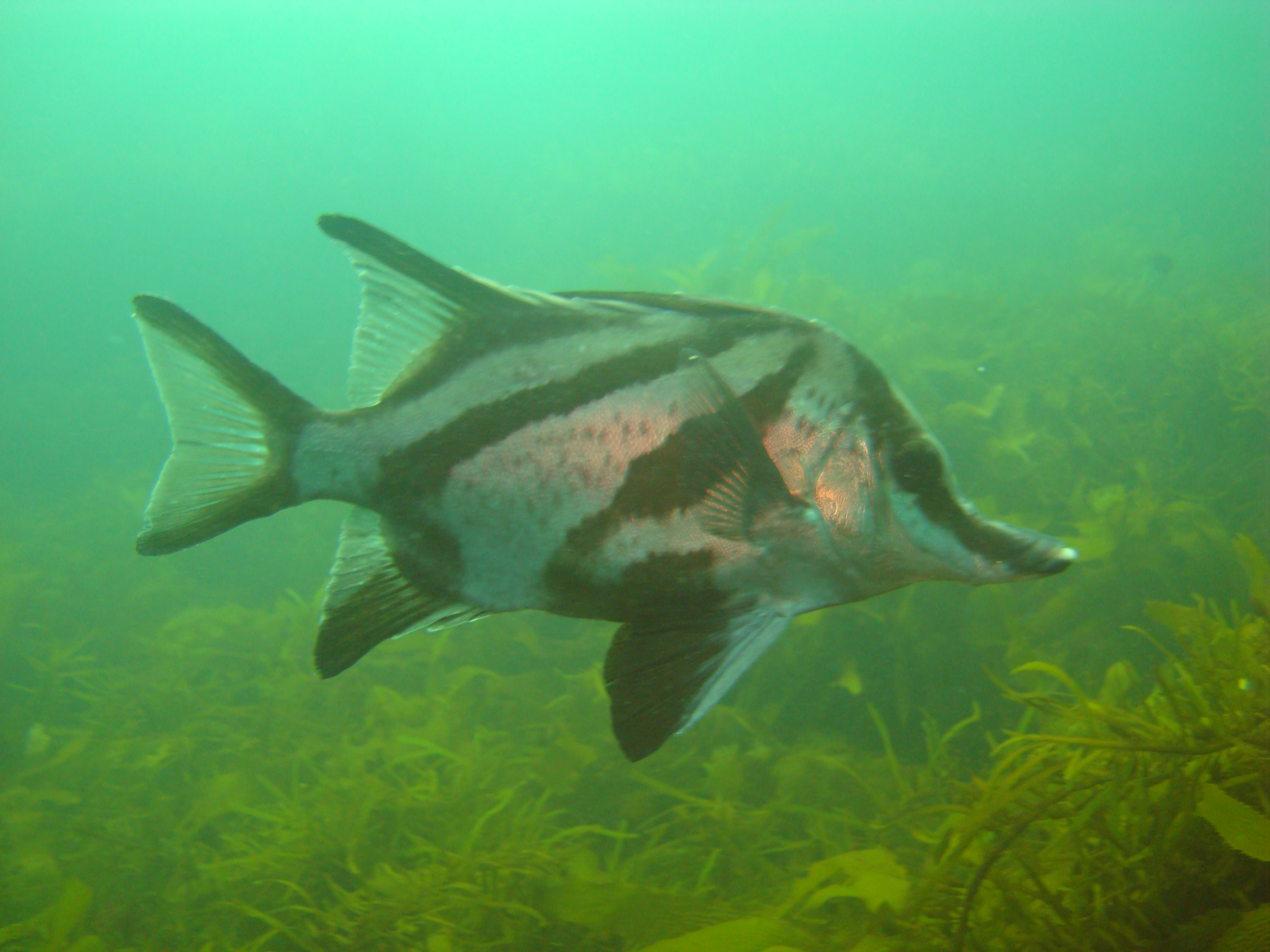
Pentaceropsis recurvirostris, the longsnout boarfish

The Acropomatiformes include over 300 species in 20 families worldwide. The following classification is based on Eschmeyer's Catalog of Fishes (2025):

- Order Acropomatiformes
  - Family Scombropidae Gill ,1862 (gnomefishes)
  - Family Ostracoberycidae Fowler, 1934 (shellskin alfonsinos)
  - Family Acropomatidae Gill, 1893 (lanternbellies)
  - Family Symphysanodontidae Katayama, 1984 (slopefishes)
  - Family Epigonidae Poey, 1861 (deepwater cardinalfishes)
  - Family Howellidae Ogilby, 1899 (lanternbellies or oceanic basslets)
  - Family Polyprionidae Bleeker, 1874 (wreckfishes)
  - Family Lateolabracidae Ghedotti, Davis & Smith, 2018 (Asian seaperches)
  - Family Glaucosomatidae Jordan & Thompson, 1911 (pearl perches)
  - Family Pempheridae Bleeker, 1859 (sweepers)
  - Family Dinolestidae Whitley, 1948 (longfinned pikes)
  - Family Stereolepididae Smith, Ghedotti & Davis, 2022 (giant sea basses)
  - Family Banjosidae Jordan & Thompson, 1912 (banjofishes)
  - Family Pentacerotidae Bleeker, 1859 (armorheads)
  - Family Malakichthyidae Jordan & Richardson, 1910 (temperate ocean-basses)
  - Family Champsodontidae Jordan & Snyder, 1902 (gapers)
  - Family Hemerocoetidae Kaup, 1873 (Indo-Pacific duckbills)
  - Family Creediidae Waite, 1899 (sand burrowers)
  - Family Synagropidae Smith, 1961 (splitfin ocean-basses)
  - Family Bathyclupeidae Gill, 1896 (deepsea herrings)
  - Genus Schuettea Steindachner, 1866 (eastern pomfret; family incertae sedis)

== Phylogeny ==
Cladogram from Near & Thacker, 2024:

- Acropomatiformes
  - - - Acropomatidae (lanternbellies)
      - Ostracoberyx (shellskin alfonsinos)
    - - Scombrops (gnomefishes)
      - - Symphysanodontidae (slopefishes)
        - - Epigonidae (deepwater cardinalfishes)
          - Howellidae (oceanic basslets)
  - - - Polyprion (wreckfishes)
      - - Lateolabrax (Asian seabasses)
        - - Glaucosoma (pearl perches)
          - Pempheridae (sweepers)
    - - Dinolestes lewini (long-finned pike)
      - Malakichthyidae (temperate seabasses)
      - - Stereolepis (giant seabasses)
        - - Banjos (banjofishes)
          - Pentacerotidae (armourheads)
      - - - Bathyclupeidae (deepsea herrings)
          - Synagropidae (splitfin seabasses)
        - - - Champsodon (gapers)
            - Schuettea (moony pomfrets)
          - - Creediidae (sandburrowers)
            - Hemerocoetidae (signalfishes)
