= Demersal fish =

Fish that live and feed on or near the bottom of seas or lakes

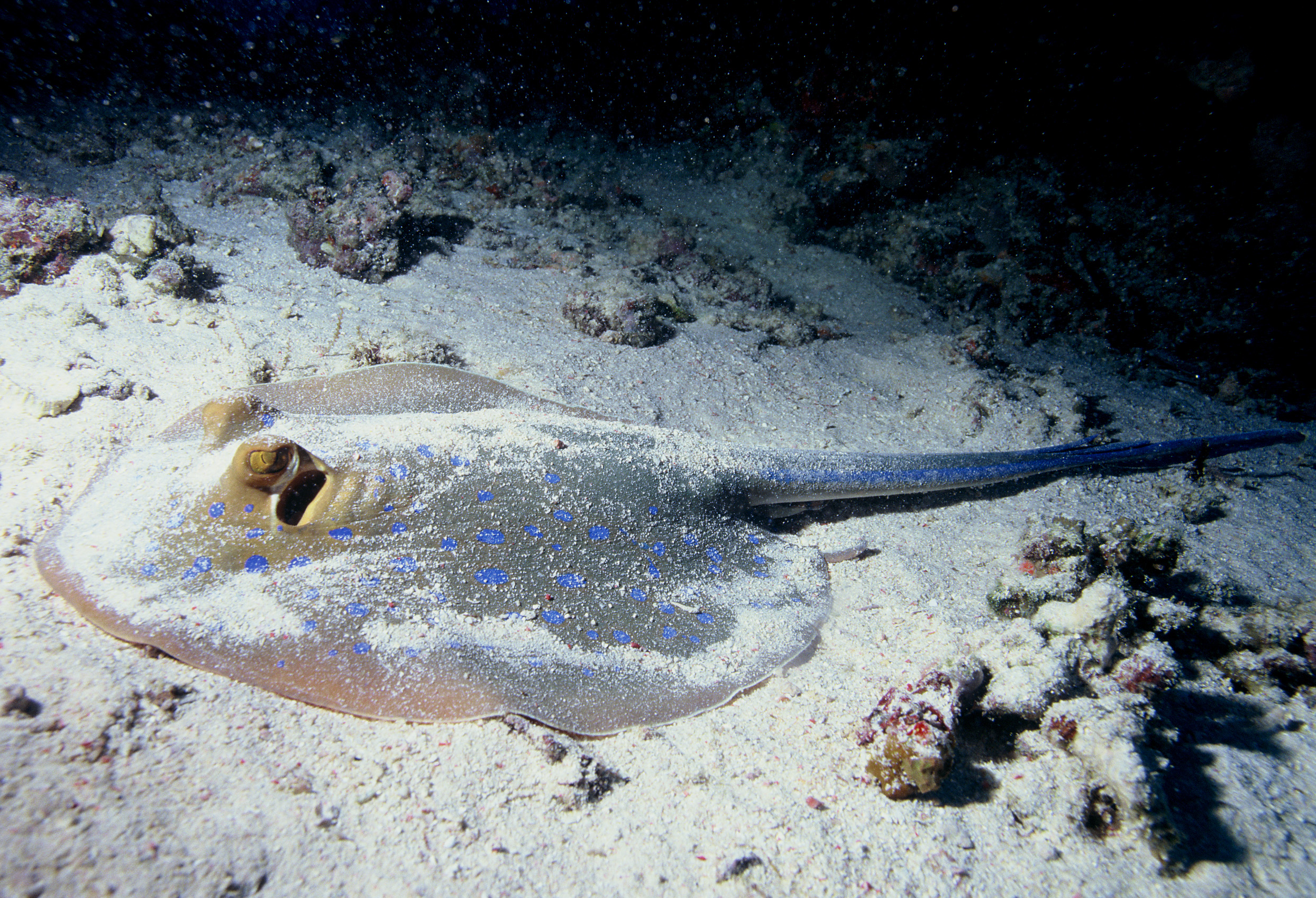
Bluespotted ribbontail ray resting on the seafloor

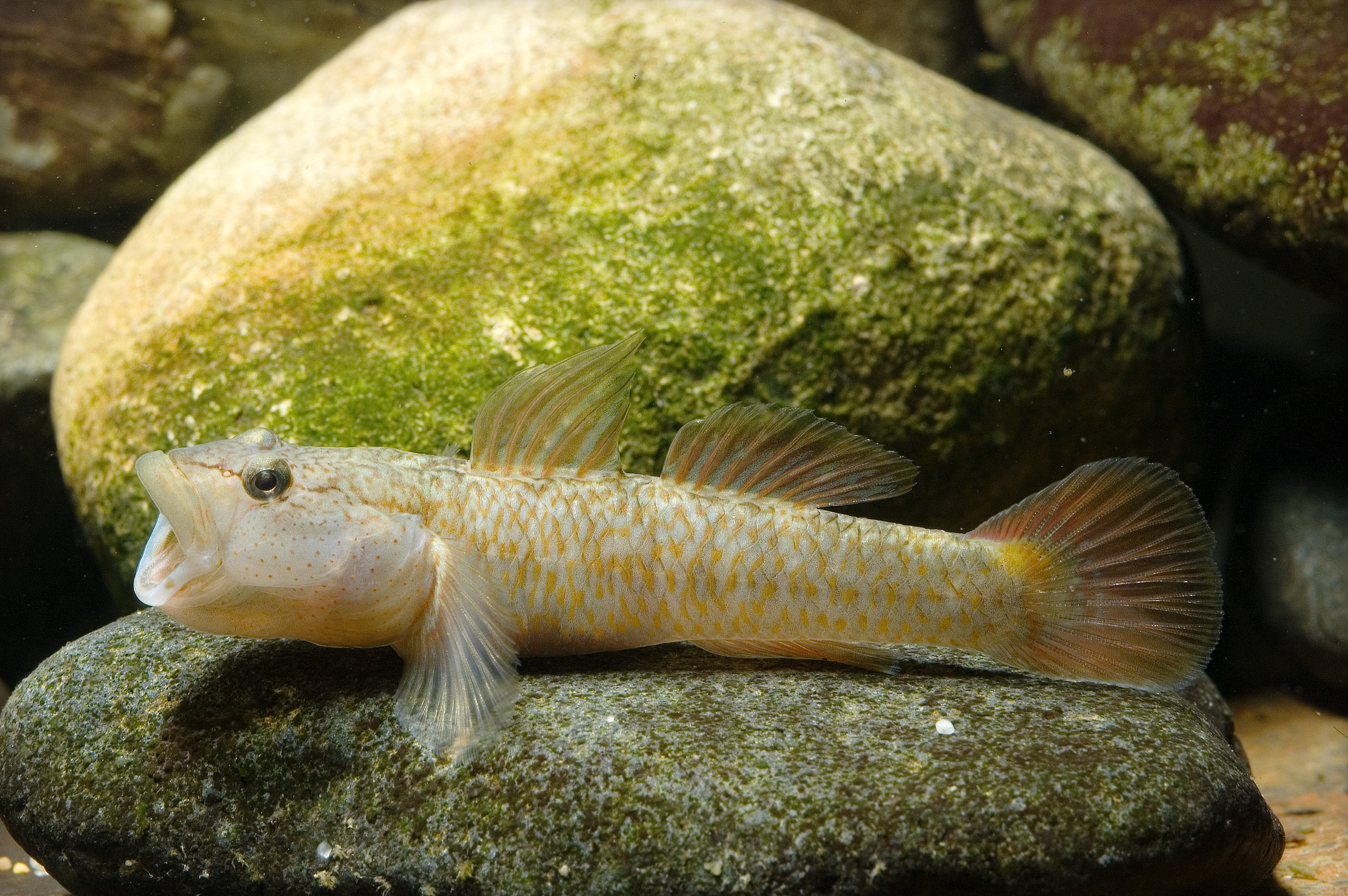
Rhinogobius flumineus swim on the beds of rivers

Demersal fish, also known as groundfish, live and feed on or near the bottom of seas or lakes (the demersal zone). They occupy the sea floors and lake beds, which usually consist of mud, sand, gravel or rocks. In coastal waters, they are found on or near the continental shelf, and in deep waters, they are found on or near the continental slope or along the continental rise. They are not generally found in the deepest waters, such as abyssal depths or on the abyssal plain, but they can be found around seamounts and islands. The word demersal comes from the Latin demergere, which means to sink.

Demersal fish are bottom feeders. They can be contrasted with pelagic fish, which live and feed away from the bottom in the open water column. Demersal fish fillets contain little fish oil (one to four percent), whereas pelagic fish can contain up to 30 percent.

== Types ==
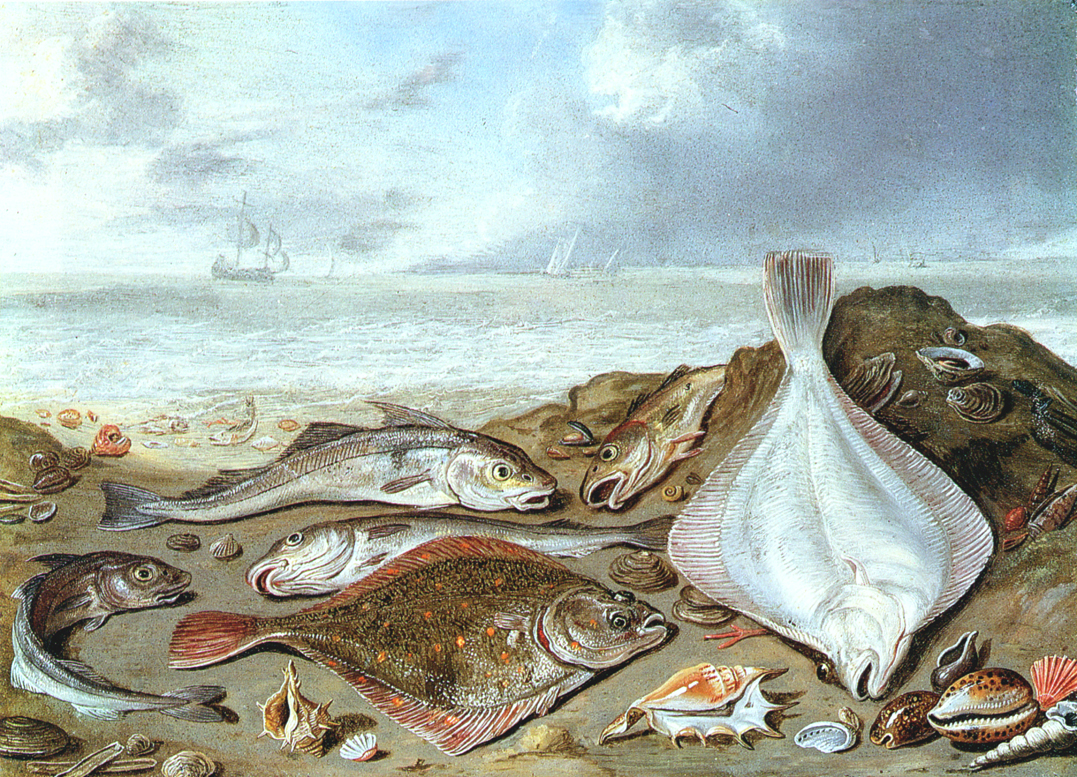
Benthic flatfish and benthopelagic cod on a shore – Jan van Kessel senior, 1626–1679

Demersal fish can be divided into two main types: strictly benthic fish which can rest on the sea floor, and benthopelagic fish which can float in the water column just above the sea floor.

Benthopelagic fish have neutral buoyancy, so they can float at depth without much effort, while strictly benthic fish are denser, with negative buoyancy so they can lie on the bottom without any effort. Most demersal fish are benthopelagic.

As with other bottom feeders, a mechanism to deal with substrate is often necessary. With demersal fish the sand is usually pumped out of the mouth through the gill slit. Most demersal fish exhibit a flat ventral region so as to more easily rest their body on the substrate. The exception may be the flatfish, which are laterally depressed but lie on their sides. Also, many exhibit what is termed an "inferior" mouth, which means that the mouth is pointed downwards; This is beneficial as their food is often below them in the substrate. Those bottom feeders with upward-pointing mouths, such as stargazers, tend to seize swimming prey.

=== Benthic fish ===
Benthic fish are denser than water, so they can rest on the sea floor. They either lie-and-wait as ambush predators, at times covering themselves with sand or otherwise camouflaging themselves, or move actively over the bottom in search of food. Benthic fish which can bury themselves include flatfish, stingrays and dragonets.

Flatfish are an order of ray-finned benthic fishes which lie flat on the ocean floor. Examples are flounder, sole, turbot, plaice, and halibut. The adult fish of many species have both eyes on one side of the head. When the fish hatches, one eye is located on each side of its head. But as the fish grows from the larval stage, one eye migrates to the other side of the body as a process of metamorphosis. The flatfish then changes its habits, and camouflages itself by lying on the bottom of the ocean floor with both eyes facing upwards. The side to which one eye migrates depends on the species; with some species both eyes are ultimately on the left side, whereas with other species the eyes are on the right.

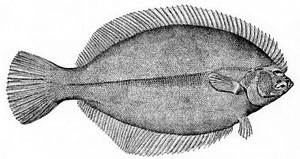
Flounder have both eyes on one side of their head

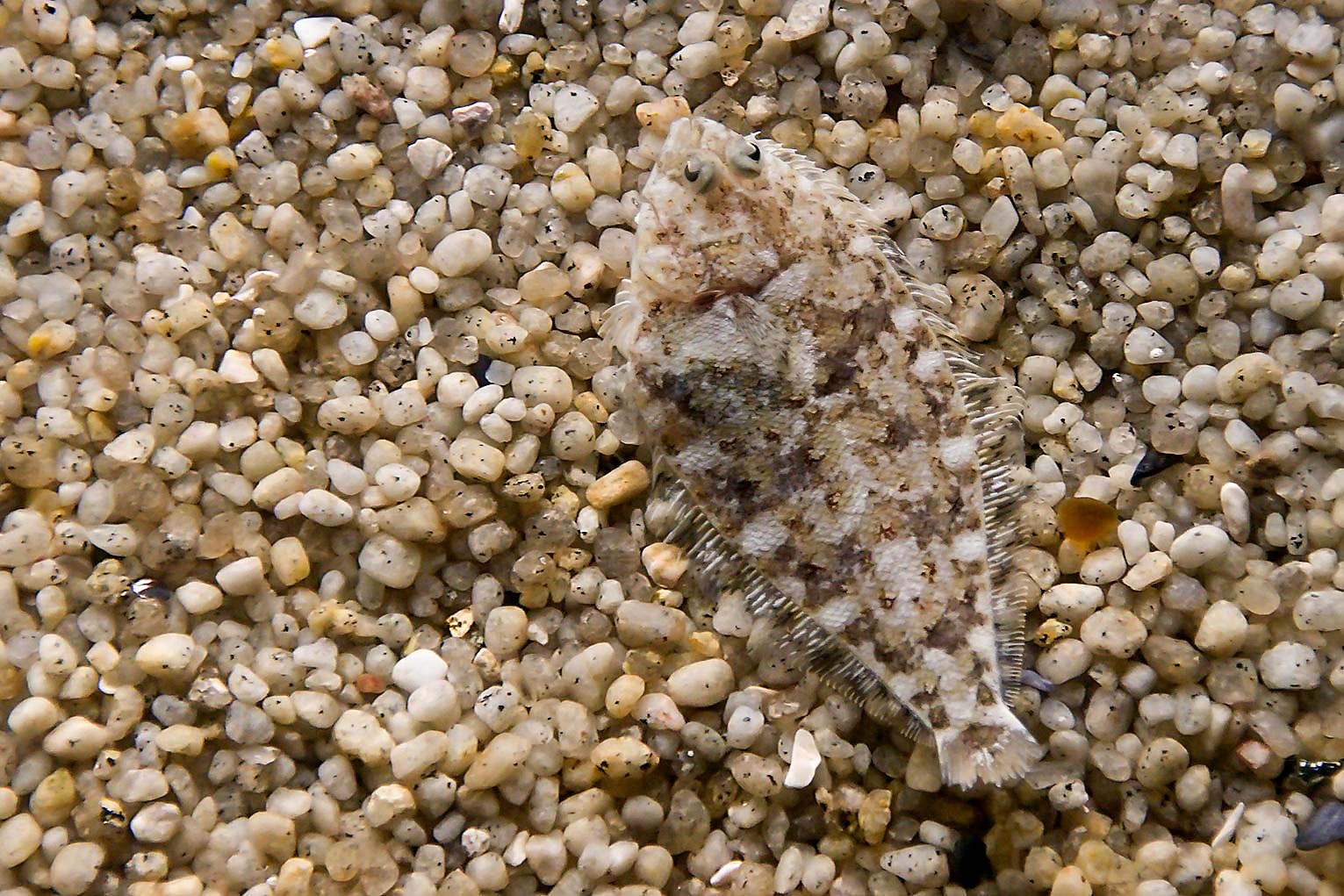
Some flatfish can camouflage themselves on the ocean floor

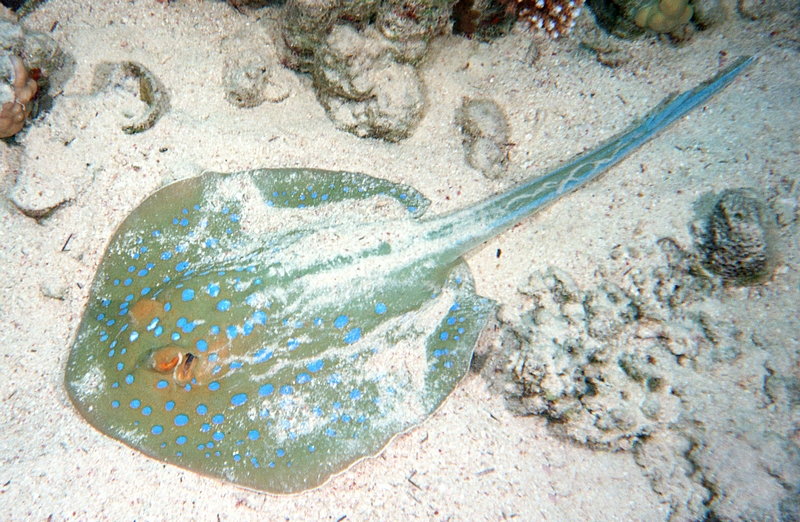
Bluespotted ribbontail rays migrate in schools onto shallow sands to feed on mollusks, shrimps, crabs and worms.

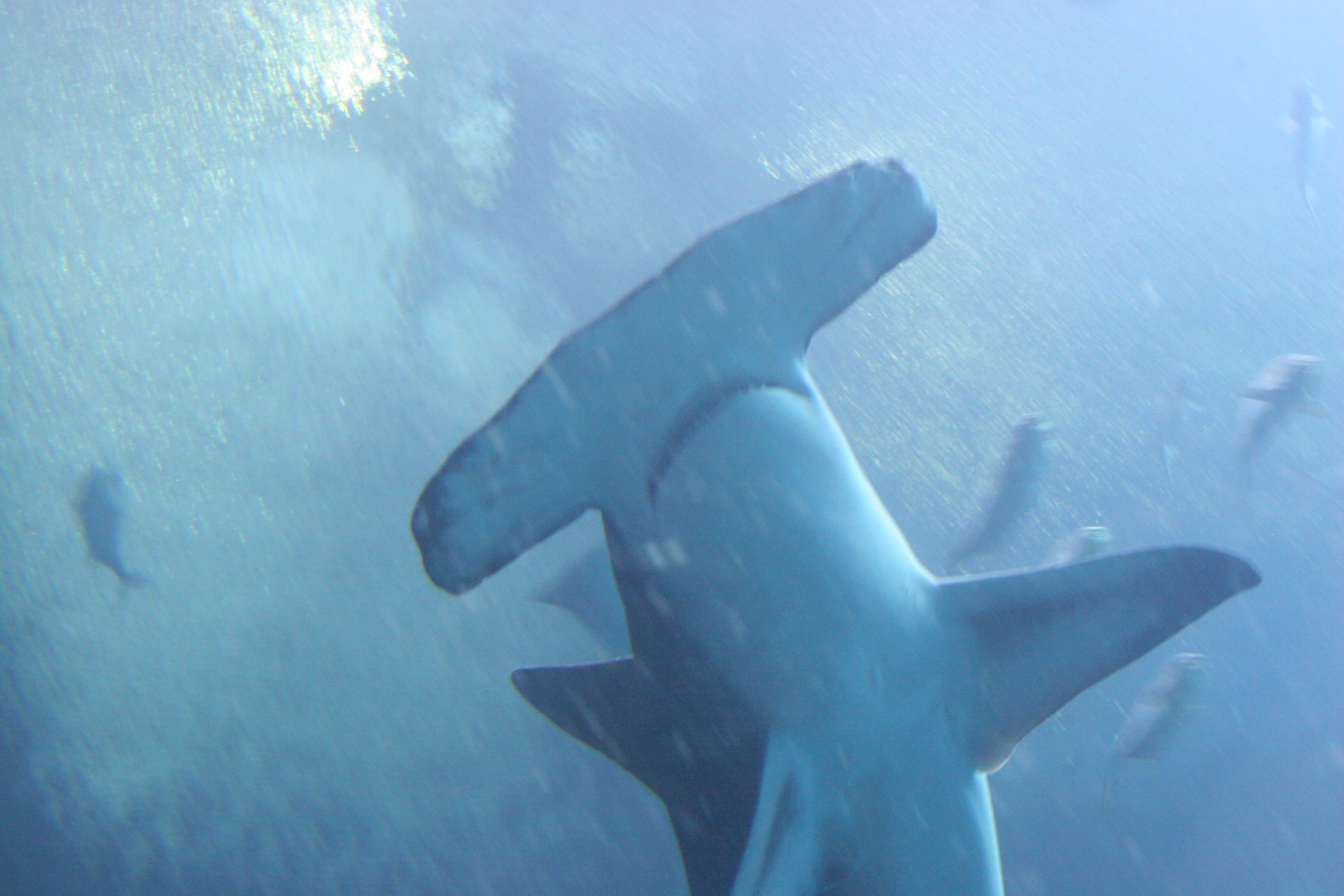
The great hammerhead detects the electrical signatures of stingrays buried in the sand and pins them with its "hammer".

Flounder ambush their prey, feeding at soft muddy areas of the sea bottom, near bridge piles, docks, artificial and coral reefs. Their diet consists mainly of fish spawn, crustaceans, polychaetes and small fish.

The great hammerhead swings its head in broad angles over the sea floor to pick up the electrical signatures of stingrays buried in the sand. It then uses its "hammer" to pin down the stingray.

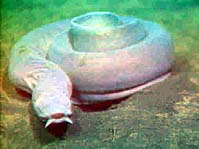
Pacific hagfish resting on bottom. Hagfish coat themselves and any dead fish they find with noxious slime making them inedible to other species.

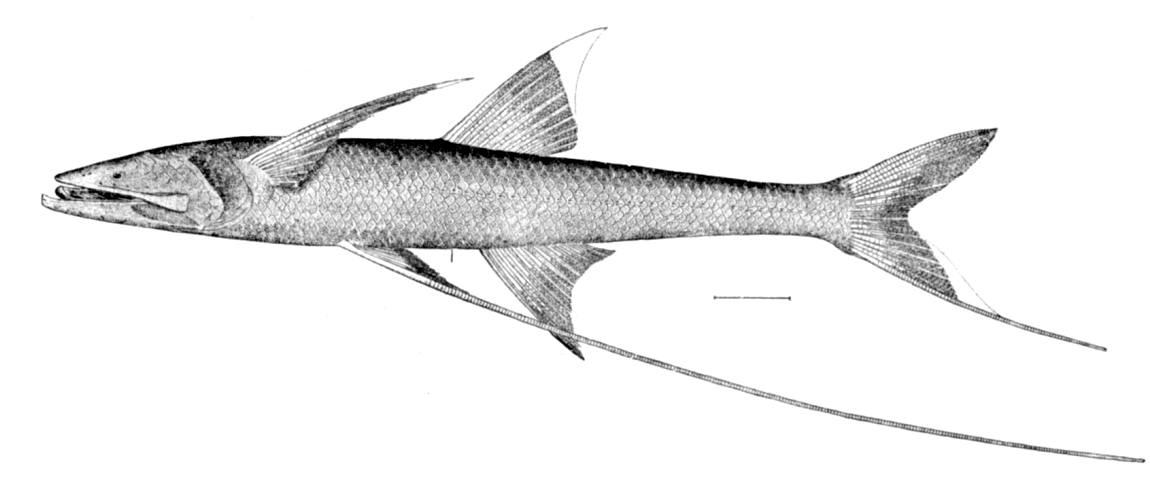
The tripodfish (Bathypterois grallator), a species of spiderfish, uses its fin extensions to "stand" on the bottom.

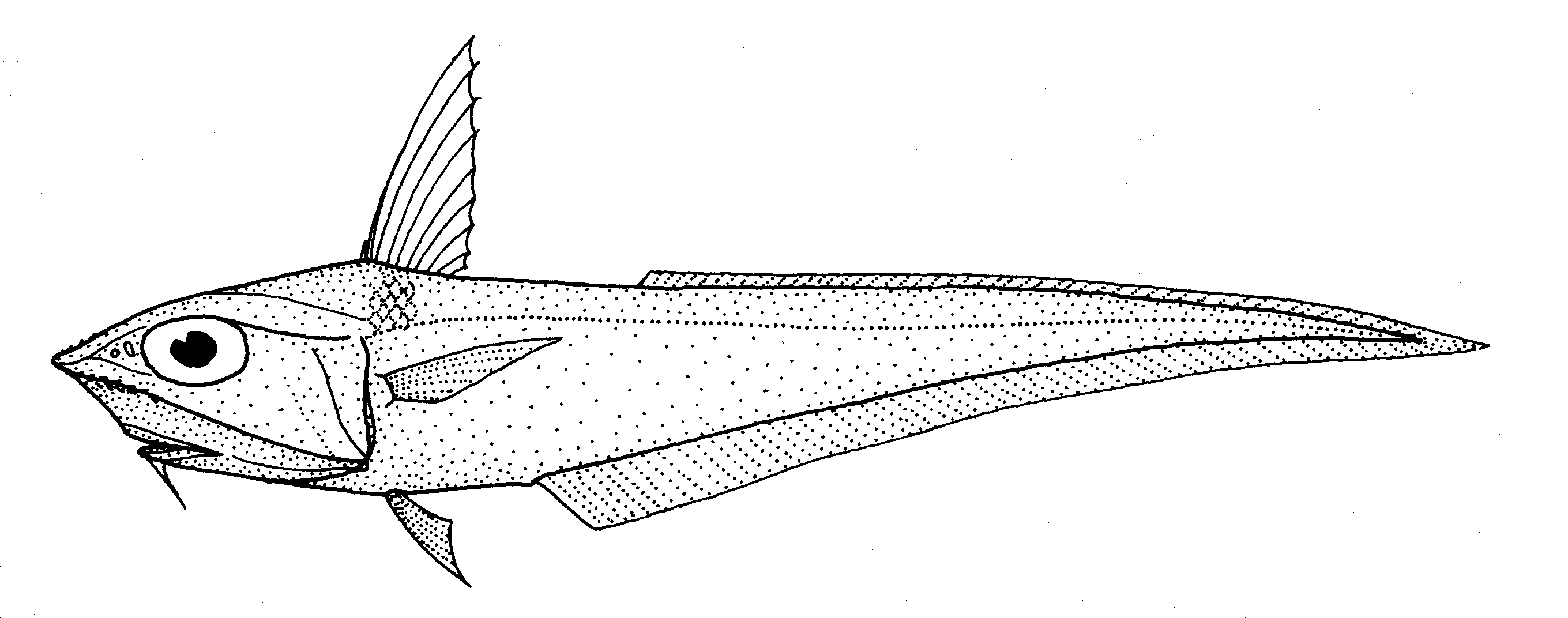
Gargoyle fish

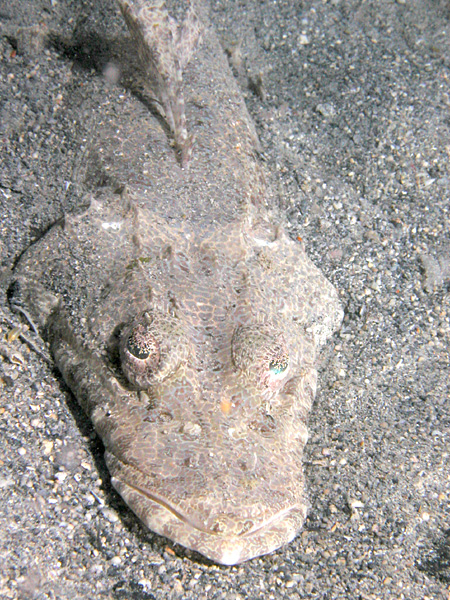
The fringe-lipped flathead is found in estuaries

Some fishes do not fit into the above classification. For example, the family of nearly blind spiderfishes, common and widely distributed, feed on benthopelagic zooplankton. Yet they are strictly benthic fish, since they stay in contact with the bottom. Their fins have long rays they use to "stand" on the bottom while they face the current and grab zooplankton as it passes by.

The bodies of benthic fish are adapted for ongoing contact with the sea floor. Swimbladders are usually absent or reduced, and the bodies are usually flattened in one way or another. Following Moyle and Cech (2004) they can be divided into five overlapping body shapes:

Body types of benthic fish
Bottom rovers	Blue catfish	Bottom rovers "have a rover-predator-like body, except that the head tends to be flattened, the back humped, and the pectoral fins enlarged. North American catfish with large mouths at the end of the snout, small armoured catfish with small mouths beneath the snout, and sturgeons, with fleshy protusible lips located well below the snout that are used to suck plant and animal matter off the bottom."
Bottom clingers	Two freshwater gobies, Rhinogobius duospilus	Bottom clingers "are mainly small fish with flattened heads, large pectoral fins, and structures (usually modified pelvic fins) that enable them to adhere to the bottom. Such structures are handy in swift streams, or intertidal areas with strong currents. The simplest arrangement is possessed by sculpins, which use their small, closely spaced pelvic fins, as antiskid devices. However, other families of fishes, such as gobies, and clingfishes have evolved suction cups."
Bottom hiders	Florida sand darter, Ammocrypta bifascia	Bottom hiders "are similar in many ways to bottom clingers. but they lack the clinging devices and tend to have more elongate bodies and smaller heads. These forms usually live under rocks or in crevices or lie quietly on the bottom in still waters. The darters of North American streams are in the category, as are many blennies."
Flatfish	American plaice	Flatfish "have the most extreme morphologies of the bottom fish. Flounders are essentially deep-bodied fish which live with one side on the bottom. In these fish, the eye on the downward side migrates during development to the upward side, and the mouth often assumes a peculiar twist to enable bottom feeding. In contrast, skates and rays are flattened dorsoventrally, and mostly move about by flapping their extremely large pectoral fins. Not only is the mouth completely ventral on these fish, the main water intakes for respiration (the spiracles) are located on the top of the head."
Rattail-shaped fish	Viviparous brotula	Rattail-shaped fish "have bodies that begin with large pointy-snouted heads and large pectoral fins and end in long pointed rat-like tails. These fish are almost all bottom-dwelling (benthic) inhabitants of the deep sea, but exactly why this peculiar morphology is so popular among them is poorly understood. The fish live by scavenging and preying on benthic invertebrates. Examples are the grenadiers, viviparous brotulas (pictured), and chimaeras."

=== Benthopelagic fish ===
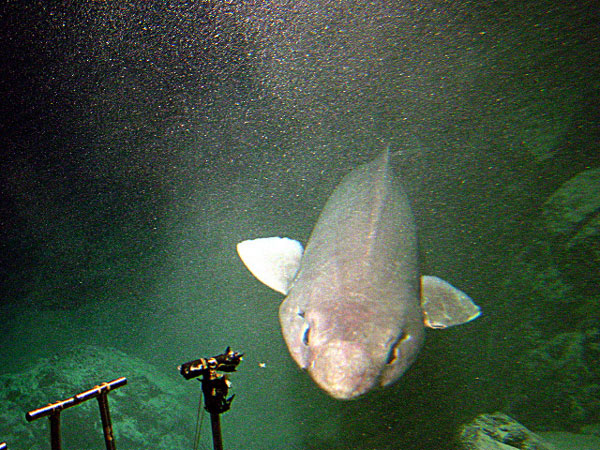
The sluggish bathydemersal false catshark, shown here at a depth of 1,200 meters, has an enormous oil-filled liver which lets it hover off the continental slope at near-neutral buoyancy. It feeds on cephalopods, cutthroat eels, grenadiers, snake mackerel, and lanternsharks.

Benthopelagic fish inhabit the water just above the bottom, feeding on benthos and zooplankton. Most demersal fish are benthopelagic.

Deep sea benthopelagic teleosts all have swimbladders. The dominant species, rattails and cusk eels, have considerable biomass. Other species include deep sea cods (morids), deep sea eels, halosaurs and notacanths.

Benthopelagic sharks, like the deep sea squaloid sharks, achieve neutral buoyancy with the use of large oil-filled livers. Sharks adapt well to fairly high pressures. They can often be found on slopes down to about 2000 metres, scavenging on food falls such as dead whales. However, the energy demands of sharks are high, since they need to swim constantly and maintain a large amount of oil for buoyancy. These energy needs cannot be met in the extreme oligotrophic conditions that occur at great depths.

Shallow water stingrays are benthic, and can lie on the bottom because of their negative buoyancy. Deep sea stingrays are benthopelagic, and like the squaloids have very large livers which give them neutral buoyancy.

Benthopelagic fish can be divided into flabby or robust body types. Flabby benthopelagic fishes are like bathypelagic fishes; they have a reduced body mass, and low metabolic rates, expending minimal energy as they lie and wait to ambush prey. An example of a flabby fish is the cusk-eel Acanthonus armatus, a predator with a huge head and a body that is 90 per cent water. This fish has the largest ears (otoliths) and the smallest brain in relation to its body size of all known vertebrates.

Deepwater benthopelagic fish are robust, muscular swimmers that actively cruise the bottom searching for prey. They often live around features, such as seamounts, which have strong currents. Commercial examples are the orange roughy and Patagonian toothfish.

== Habitats ==
Profile illustrating the shelf, slope and rise

The edge of the continental shelf marks the boundary where the shelf gives way to, and then gradually drops into abyssal depths. This edge marks the boundary between coastal, relatively shallow, benthic habitats, and the deep benthic habitats. Coastal demersal fishes live on the bottom of inshore waters, such as bays and estuaries, and further out, on the floor of the continental shelf. Deep water demersal fish live beyond this edge, mostly down the continental slopes and along the continental rises which drop to the abyssal plains. This is the continental margin, constituting about 28% of the total oceanic area. Other deep sea demersal fish can also be found around seamounts and islands.

The term bathydemersal fish is sometimes used instead of "deep water demersal fish". Bathydemersal refers to demersal fish which live at depths greater than 200 metres.

The term epibenthic is also used to refer to organism that live on top of the ocean floor, as opposed to those that burrow into the seafloor substrate. However the terms mesodemersal, epidemersal, mesobenthic and bathybenthic are not used.

=== Coastal ===
Coastal demersal fish are found on or near the seabed of coastal waters between the shoreline and the edge of the continental shelf, where the shelf drops into the deep ocean. Since the continental shelf is generally less than 200 metres deep, this means that coastal waters are generally epipelagic. The term includes demersal reef fish and demersal fish that inhabit estuaries, inlets and bays.

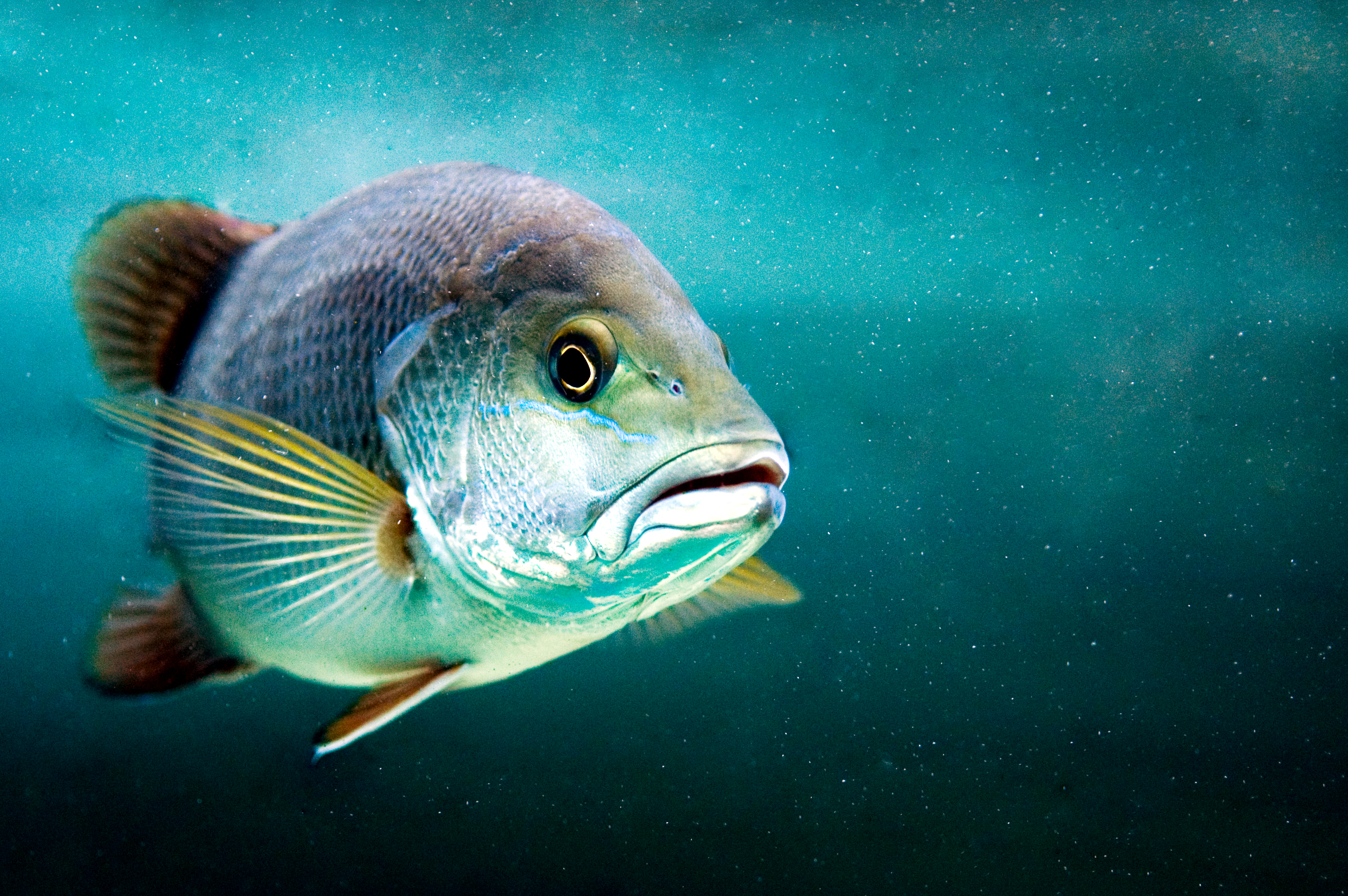
The mangrove jack eats crustaceans

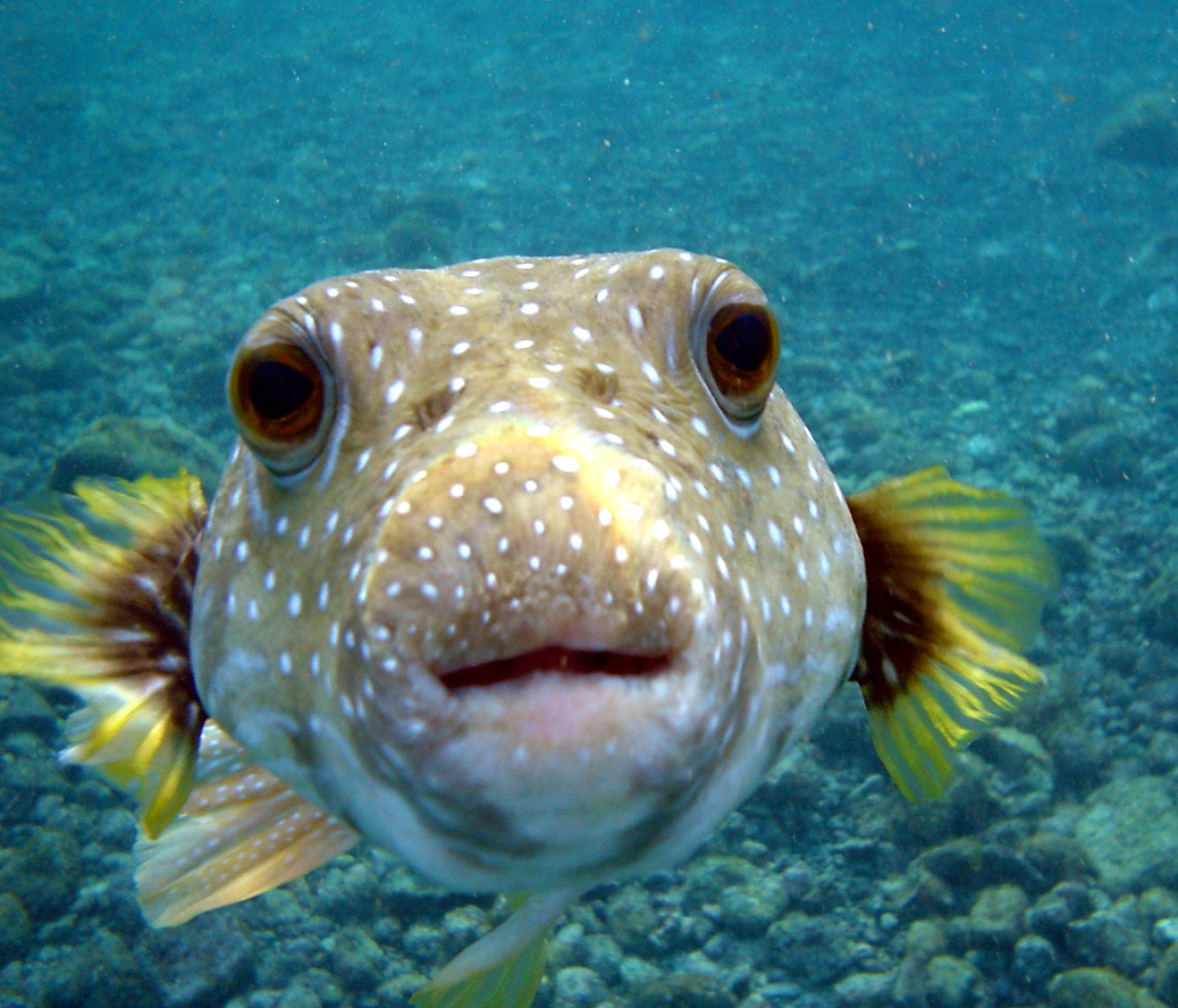
Many puffer fish species crush the shells of molluscs

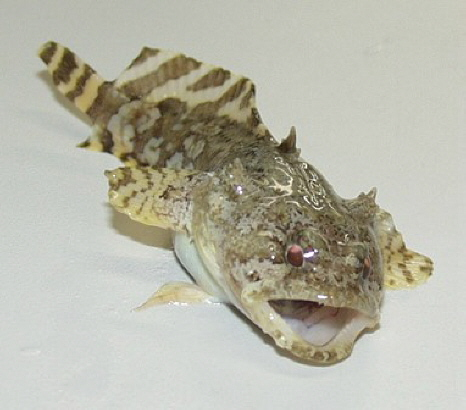
The venomous toadfish, a benthic ambush predator, blends into sandy or muddy bottoms.

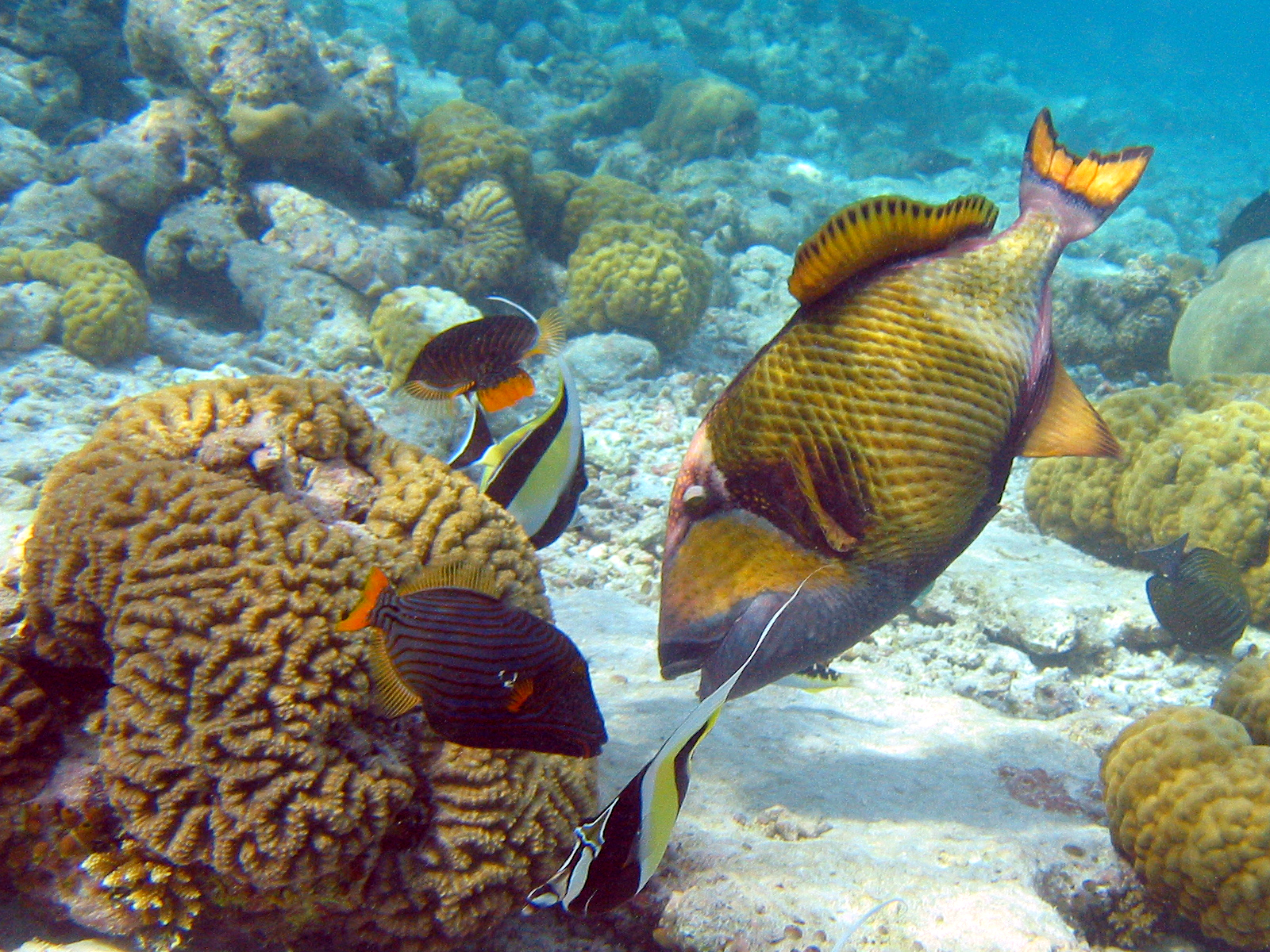
Triggerfish use a jet of water to uncover sand dollars buried in sand

Young mangrove jacks, a sought after eating and sport fish, dwell in estuaries around mangrove roots, fallen trees, rock walls, and any other snag areas where smaller prey reside for protection. When they mature, they migrate into open waters, sometimes hundreds of kilometres from the coast to spawn.

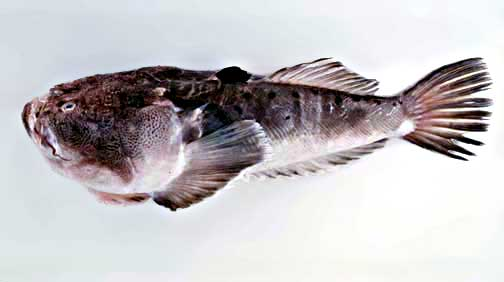
The stargazer Uranoscopus sulphureus

Stargazers are found worldwide in shallow waters. They have eyes on top of their heads and a large upward-facing mouth. They bury themselves in sand, and leap upwards to ambush benthopelagic fish and invertebrates that pass overhead. Some species have a worm-shaped lure growing out of the floor of the mouth, which they wiggle to attract prey. Stargazers are venomous and can deliver electric shocks. They have been called "the meanest things in creation."

Other examples of coastal demersal fish are cod, plaice, monkfish and sole.

=== Deep water ===
Cross-section of an ocean basin. Note significant vertical exaggeration.

Deep water demersal fish occupy the benthic regions beyond the continental margins.

On the continental slope, demersal fishes are common. They are more diverse than coastal demersal fish, since there is more habitat diversity. Further out are the abyssal plains. These flat, featureless regions occupy about 40 per cent of the ocean floor. They are covered with sediment but largely devoid of benthic life (benthos). Deep sea benthic fishes are more likely to associate with canyons or rock outcroppings among the plains, where invertebrate communities are established. Undersea mountains (seamounts) can intercept deep sea currents, and cause productive upwellings which support benthic fish. Undersea mountain ranges can separate underwater regions into different ecosystems.

Rattails and brotulas are common, and other well-established families are eels, eelpouts, hagfishes, greeneyes, batfishes and lumpfishes.

The bodies of deep water demersal fishes are muscular with well developed organs. In this way they are closer to mesopelagic fishes than bathypelagic fishes. In other ways, they are more variable. Photophores are usually absent, eyes and swimbladders range from absent to well developed. They vary in size, and larger species, greater than one metre, are not uncommon.

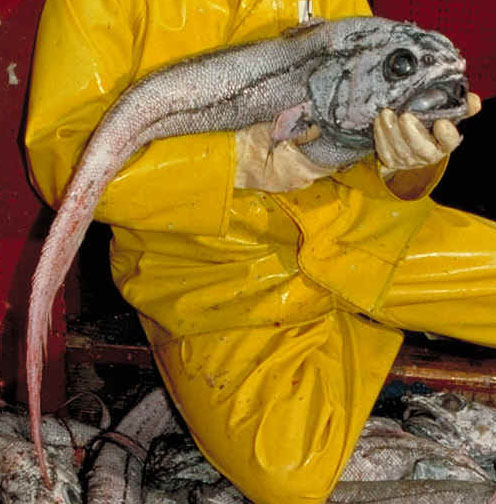
Giant grenadier, an elongate deep water demersal fish with large eyes and well-developed lateral lines

Deep sea demersal fish are usually long and narrow. Many are eels or shaped like eels. This may be because long bodies have long lateral lines. Lateral lines detect low-frequency sounds, and some demersal fishes have muscles that drum such sounds to attract mates. Smell is also important, as indicated by the rapidity with which demersal fish find traps baited with bait fish.

The main diet of deep sea demersal fish is invertebrates of the deep sea benthos and carrion. Smell, touch and lateral line sensitivities seem to be the main sensory devices for locating these.

Like coastal demersal fish, deep sea demersal fish can be divided into benthic fish and benthopelagic fish, where the benthic fish are negatively buoyant and benthopelagic fish are neutrally buoyant.

The availability of plankton for food diminishes rapidly with depth. At 1,000 metres (3,300 ft), the biomass of plankton is typically about 1 per cent of that at the surface, and at 5,000 metres (16,000 ft) about 0.01 per cent. Given there is no sunlight, energy enters deep water zones as organic matter. There are three main ways this happens. Firstly, organic matter can move into the zone from the continental landmass, for example, through currents that carry the matter down rivers, then plume along the continental shelf and finally spill down the continental slope. Other matter enters as particulate matter raining down from the overhead water column in the form of marine snow, or as sinking overhead plant material such as eelgrass, or as "large particles" such as dead fish and whales sinking to the bottom. A third way energy can arrive is through fish, such as vertically migrating mesopelagic fishes that can enter into the demersal zone as they ascend or descend. The demersal fish and invertebrates consume organic matter that does arrive, break it down and recycle it. A consequence of these energy delivery mechanisms is that the abundance of demersal fish and invertebrates gradually decrease as the distance from continental shorelines increases.

Although deep water demersal fish species are not generally picky about what they eat, there is still some degree of specialisation. For example, different fish have different mouth sizes, which determines the size of the prey they can handle. Some feed mostly on benthopelagic organisms. Others fed mostly on epifauna (invertebrates on top of the seafloor surface, also called epibenthos), or alternatively on infauna (invertebrates that burrow into the seafloor substrate). Infauna feeders can have considerable sediment in their stomachs. Scavengers, such as snubnosed eels and hagfish, also eat infauna as a secondary food source.

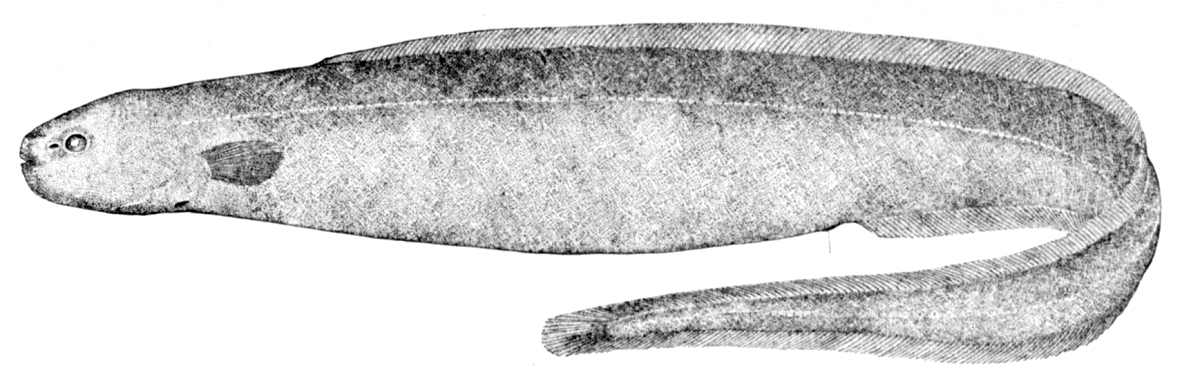
Snubnosed eel

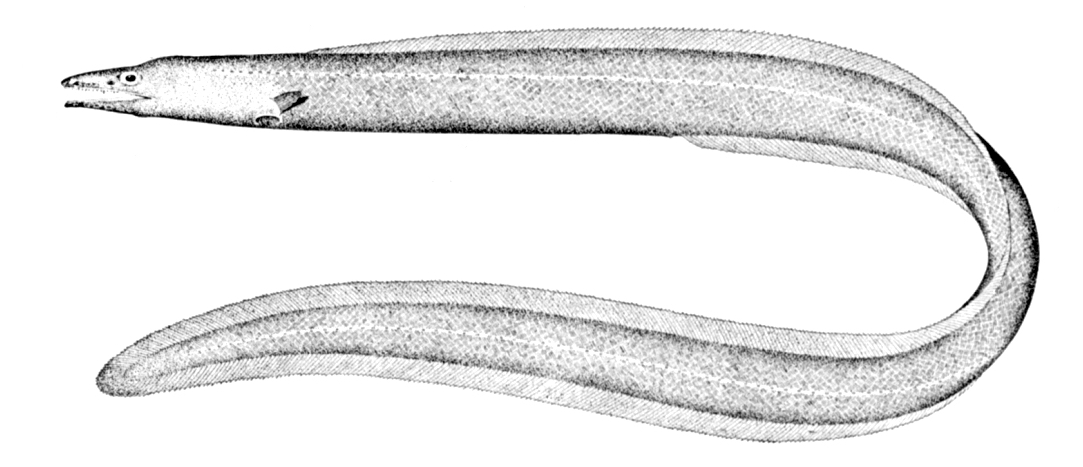
Muddy arrowtooth eel

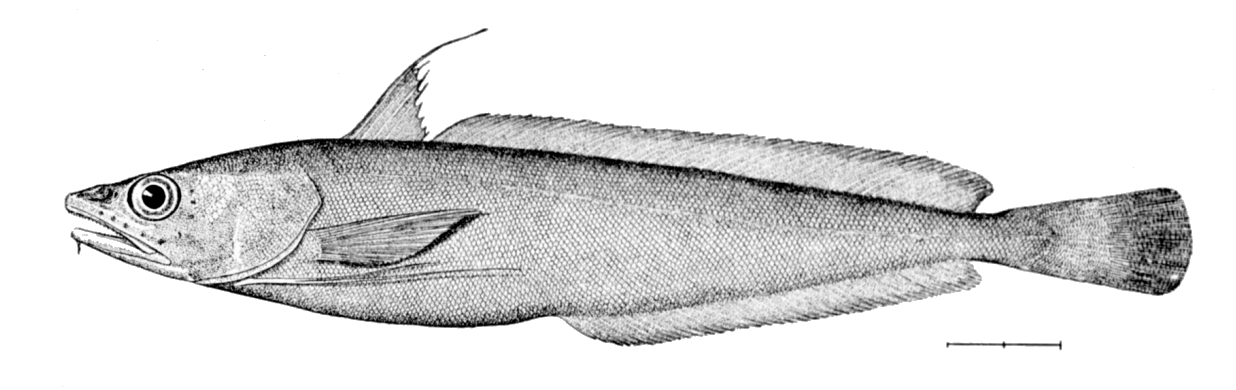
White hake

Some feed on carrion. Cameras show that when a dead fish is placed on the bottom, vertebrate and invertebrate scavengers appear very quickly. If the fish is large, some scavengers burrow in and eat it from the inside out. Some fish, such as grenadiers, also appear and start feeding on the scavenging invertebrates and amphipods. Other specialization is based on depth distribution. Some of the more abundant upper continental slope fish species, such as cutthroat eel and longfinned hake, mainly feed on epipelagic fish. But generally, the most abundant deep water demersal fish species feed on invertebrates.

At great depths, food scarcity and extreme pressure limits the ability of fish to survive. The deepest point of the ocean is about 11,000 metres. Bathypelagic fishes are not normally found below 3,000 metres. It may be that extreme pressures interfere with essential enzyme functions.

The deepest-living fish known, the strictly benthic Abyssobrotula galatheae, eel-like and blind, feeds on benthic invertebrates. A living example was trawled from the bottom of the Puerto Rico Trench in 1970 from a depth of 8,370 metres (27,453 ft).

In 2008, a shoal of 17 hadal snailfish, a species of deep water snailfish, was filmed by a UK-Japan team using remote operated landers at depths of 7.7 km (4.8 mi) in the Japan Trench in the Pacific. The fish were 30 centimetres long (12 in), and were darting about, using vibration sensors on their nose to catch shrimps. The team also reported that the appearance of the fish, unlike that of most deep sea fish, was surprisingly "cute", and that they were surprised by how active the fish were at these depths.

== Demersal fisheries ==
Most demersal fish of commercial or recreational interest are coastal, confined to the upper 200 metres. Commercially important demersal food fish species include flatfish, such as flounder, sole, turbot, plaice, and halibut. Also important are cod, hake, redfish, haddock, bass, congers, sharks, rays and chimaeras.

The following table shows the world capture production of some groups of demersal species in tonnes.

Capture production by groups of species in tonnes
Group	1999	2000	2001	2002	2003	2004	2005	Demersal fish output in 2005
Cods, hakes, haddocks	9,431,141	8,695,910	9,304,922	8,474,044	9,385,328	9,398,780	8,964,873	Demersal fish output in 2005
Flounders, halibuts, soles	956,926	1,009,253	948,427	915,177	917,326	862,162	900,012	Demersal fish output in 2005
Other demersal fishes	2,955,849	3,033,384	3,008,283	3,062,222	3,059,707	3,163,050	2,986,081	Demersal fish output in 2005

Black sea bass inhabit US coasts from Maine to NE Florida and the eastern Gulf of Mexico, and are most abundant off the waters of New York. They are found in inshore waters (bays and sounds) and offshore in waters up to a depth of 130 m (425'). They spend most of their time close to the sea floor and are often congregated around bottom formations such as rocks, man-made reefs, wrecks, jetties, piers, and bridge pilings. Black sea bass are sought after recreational and commercial fish, and have been overfished.

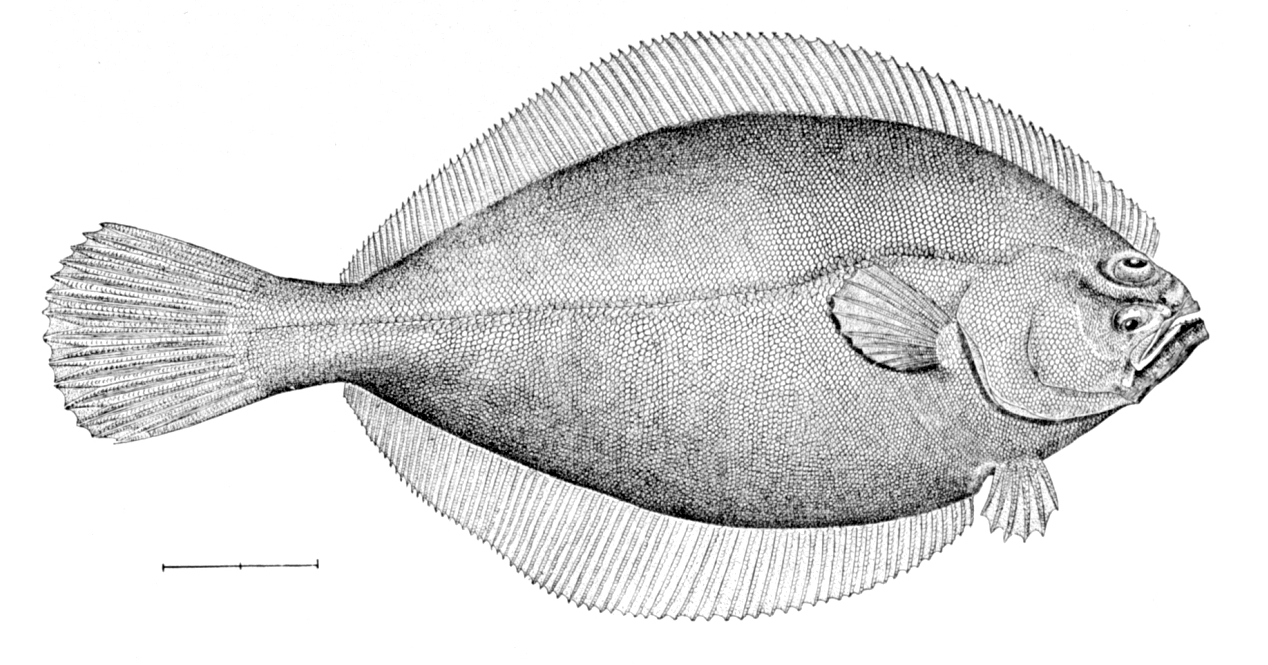
American plaice are usually found between 90 and 250 metres (but have been found at 3000 m). They feed on small fishes and invertebrates.

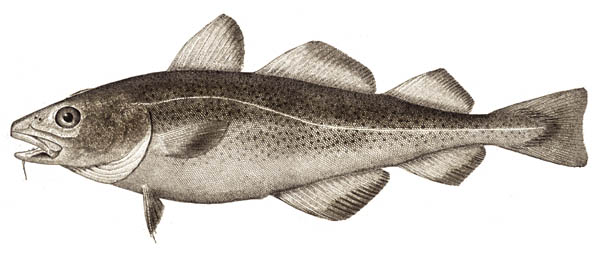
Atlantic cod are usually found between 150 and 200 metres, they are omnivorous and feed on invertebrates and fish, including young cod.

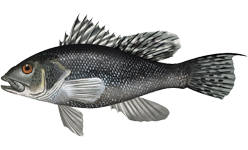
Black sea bass

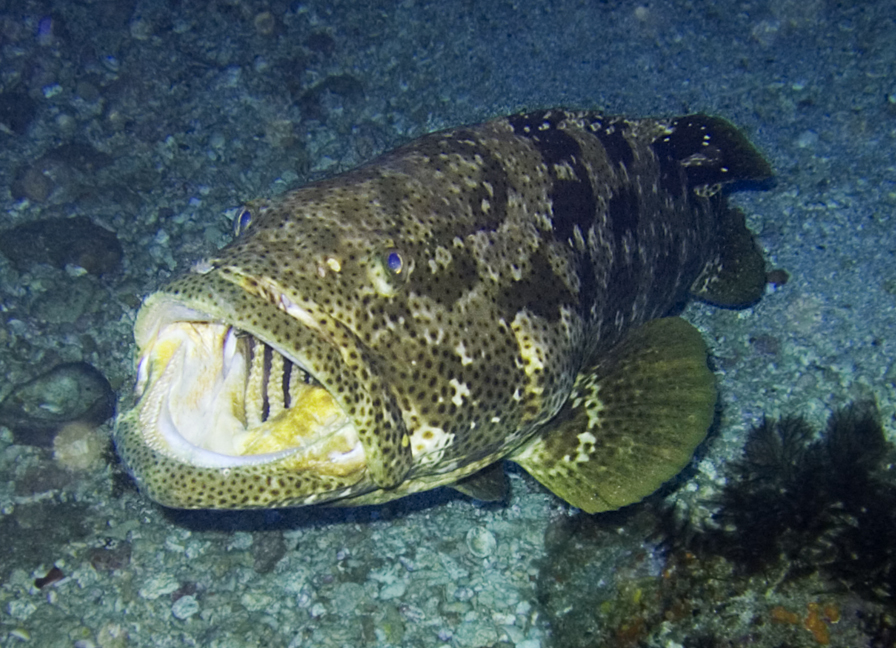
Grouper are ambush predators with a powerful sucking system that sucks their prey in from a distance

Grouper are often found around reefs. They have stout bodies and large mouths. They are not built for long-distance or fast swimming. They can be quite large, and lengths over a meter and weights up to 100 kg are not uncommon. They swallow prey rather than biting pieces off it. They do not have many teeth on the edges of their jaws, but they have heavy crushing tooth plates inside the pharynx. They lie in wait, rather than chasing in open water. They are found in areas of hard or consolidated substrate, and use structural features such as ledges, rocks, and coral reefs (as well as artificial reefs like wrecks and sunken barges) as their habitat. Their mouth and gills form a powerful sucking system that sucks their prey in from a distance. They also use their mouth to dig into sand to form their shelters under big rocks, jetting it out through their gills. Their gill muscles are so powerful that it is nearly impossible to pull them out of their cave if they feel attacked and extend those muscles to lock themselves in. There is some research indicating that roving coral groupers (Plectropomus pessuliferus) sometimes cooperate with giant morays in hunting.

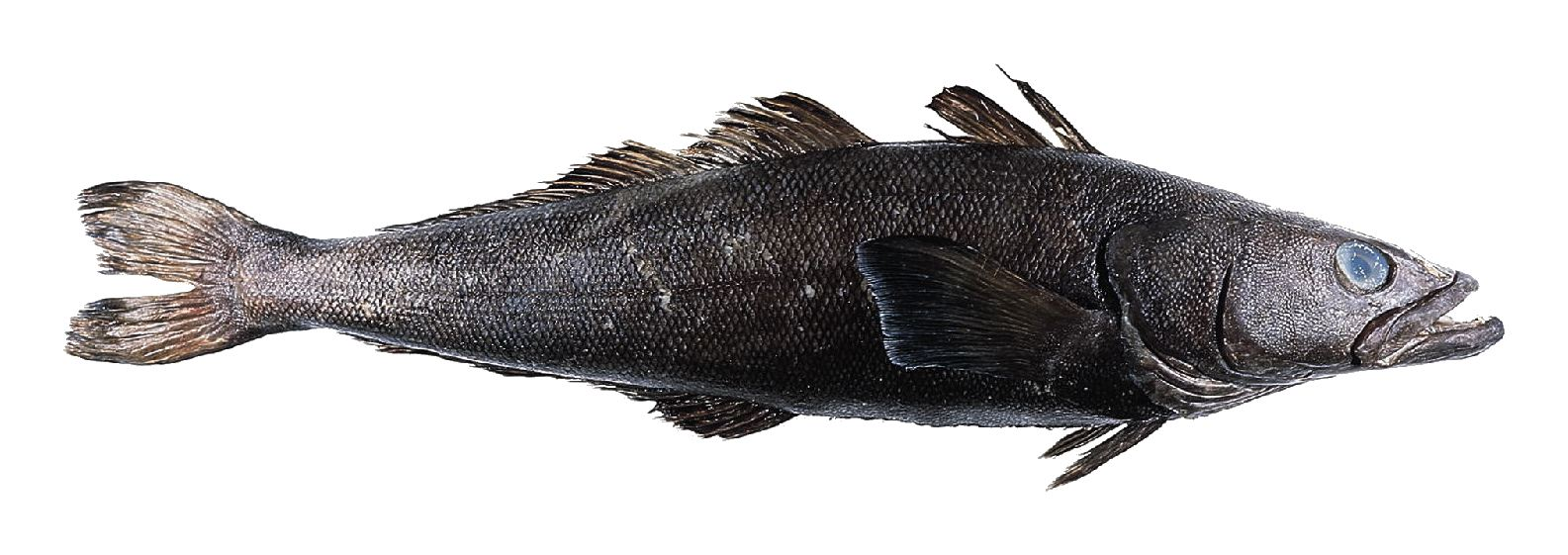
The Patagonian toothfish is a robust benthopelagic fish

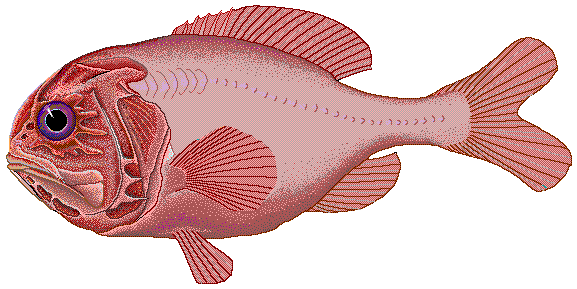
The orange roughy is also a robust benthopelagic fish

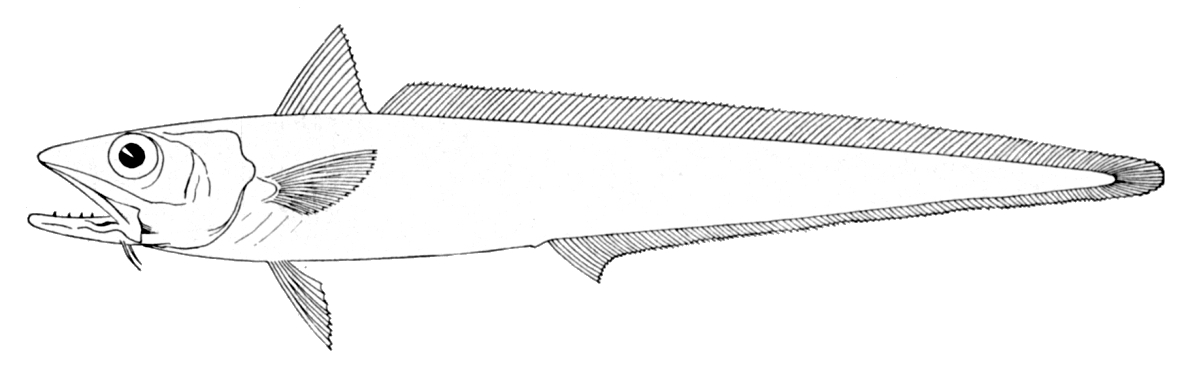
The blue grenadier (hoki), a deep water demersal fish, is subjected to a large sustainable fishing industry in New Zealand.

Deepwater benthopelagic fish are robust, muscular swimmers that actively cruise the bottom searching for prey. They often live around features, such as seamounts, which have strong currents. Commercial examples are the orange roughy and Patagonian toothfish. Because these fish were once abundant, and because their robust bodies are good to eat, these fish have been commercially harvested.

== Conservation status ==
Major demersal fishery species in the North Sea such as cod, plaice, monkfish and sole, are listed by the ICES as "outside safe biological limits."

The by-catch problem

A major problem in conservation of demersal fish populations is that of by-catch, whereby fish are caught by accident when targeting other species. The European Commission has written that “A key issue is that many of the most important demersal stocks (i.e. those that live on or near the bottom of the sea) are caught in mixed fisheries. In practice, this means that each time a vessel retrieves its fishing gear, its catch will consist of a mix of different species.” This has led to a situation whereby, even when the International Council for the Exploration of the Sea recommends a Total Allowable Catch of zero for a given demersal species in order to allow replenishment of population, the European Council nonetheless sets the Total Allowable Catch far above zero so long as the catch is by-catch, in order not to prevent trawlers fishing for other species. This means that those threatened species do not get the chance to replenish even when not directly targeted by trawlers.

- The Common Sole, Solea solea, is sufficiently broadly distributed that it is not considered a threatened species; however, overfishing in Europe has produced severely diminished populations, with declining catches in many regions. For example, the western English Channel and Irish Sea sole fisheries face potential collapse according to data in the UK Biodiversity Action Plan.
- Sole, along with the other major bottom-feeding fish in the North Sea such as cod, monkfish, and plaice, is listed by the ICES as "outside safe biological limits." Moreover, they are growing less quickly now and are rarely older than six years, although they can reach forty. World stocks of large predatory fish and large ground fish such as sole and flounder were estimated in 2003 to be only about 10% of pre-industrial levels. According to the World Wildlife Fund in 2006, "of the nine sole stocks, seven are overfished with the status of the remaining two unknown." Data is insufficient to assess the remaining stocks; however, landings for all stocks are at or near historical lows."
- World stocks of large predatory fish and large ground fish such as sole and flounder were estimated in 2003 to be only about 10% of pre-industrial levels, largely due to overfishing. Most overfishing is due to the extensive activities of the fishing industry. Current research indicate that the flounder population could be as low as 15 million due to heavy overfishing and industrial pollution along the Gulf of Mexico surrounding the coast of Texas.
- Seafood Watch have placed on their list of seafood that sustainability-minded consumers should avoid the following demersal fish: sturgeon (imported wild), Chilean seabass, cod (Atlantic, imported Pacific), flounder (Atlantic), halibut (Atlantic), sole (Atlantic), grouper, monkfish, orange roughy, demersal shark, red snapper and tilapia (Asia farmed).

== See also ==
- Bottom trawling – Fishing method by towing a net along the seafloor
- Deep sea fish – Fauna found in deep-sea areas
- Whitefish – Several species of demersal fish with fins
