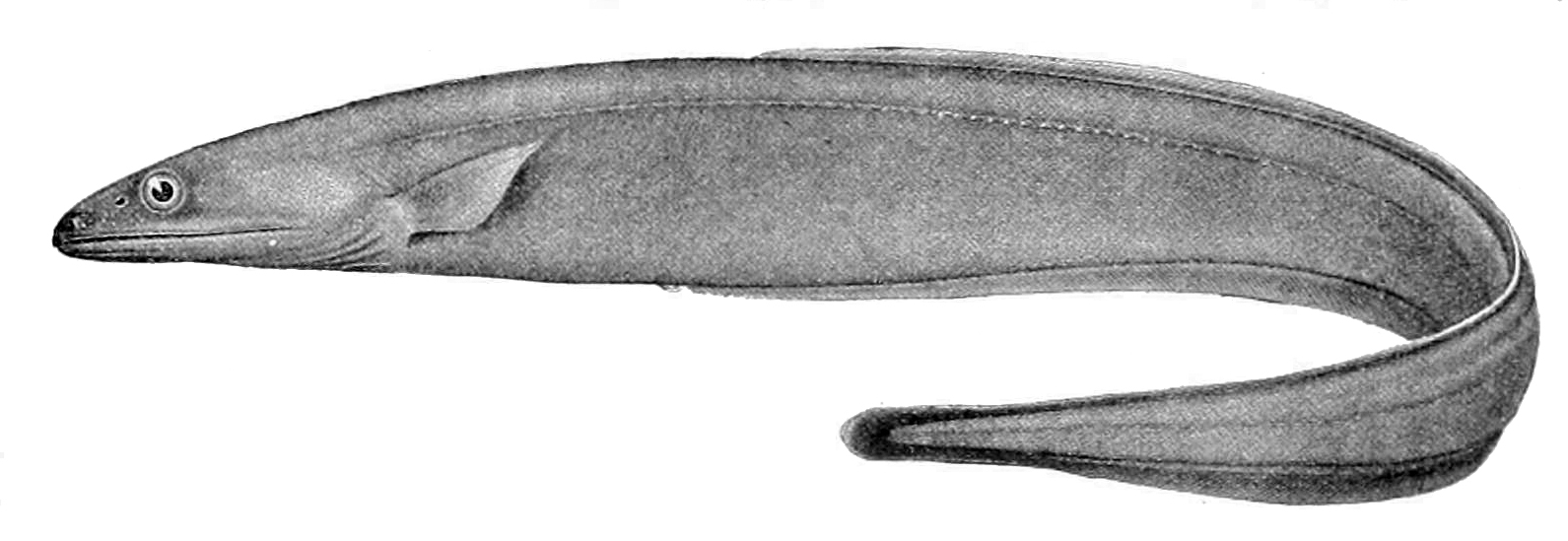
- Drawing by Dr Tony Ayling

Scientific classification
- Kingdom: Animalia
- Phylum: Chordata
- Class: Actinopterygii
- Order: Anguilliformes
- Family: Synaphobranchidae
- Genus: Synaphobranchus
- Species: S. affinis

Binomial name
- Synaphobranchus affinis Günther, 1877

= Grey cutthroat eel =

Species of fish

The grey cutthroat eel (Synaphobranchus affinis), is a cutthroat eel. It was originally described by Albert Günther in 1877. It lives a benthic lifestyle, inhabiting the continental slope and global deep waters including near Portugal, Canary Islands, Morocco, Japan, Australia, and others. It is a marine, deep water-dwelling eel which has been found at depths ranging from 300 to 2,300 meters (980 to 7,550 ft) and at temperatures ranging from 3.3 - 11.3 °C . Males can grow to a length of up to 110 centimetres (43 inches). It is primarily a scavenger, however it also actively hunts small fish and crustaceans.

The grey cutthroat eel (Synaphobranchus affinis) is commonly mistaken with Kaup's arrowtooth eel (Synaphobranchus kaupii) due to their morphological similarities. The primary method of differentiation between the two is by analyzing vertebral count, dorsal fin rays, and anal fin rays.
