= Dysomma goslinei =

Scientific classification
- Kingdom: Animalia
- Phylum: Chordata
- Class: Actinopterygii
- Order: Anguilliformes
- Family: Synaphobranchidae
- Genus: Dysomma
- Species: D. goslinei

Binomial name
- Dysomma goslinei C. R. Robins & C. H. Robins, 1976

Species of fish

Dysomma goslinei is an eel in the family Synaphobranchidae (cutthroat eels). It was described by Catherine H. Robins and C. Richard Robins in 1976. It is a tropical, marine eel which is known from the Indo-Pacific. Males can reach a maximum total length of 19.7 centimetres.

Named in honor of the authors’ colleague, ichthyologist William A. Gosline (1915-2002) of the University of Michigan.
