= Dysomma opisthoproctus =

Scientific classification
- Domain: Eukaryota
- Kingdom: Animalia
- Phylum: Chordata
- Class: Actinopterygii
- Order: Anguilliformes
- Family: Synaphobranchidae
- Genus: Dysomma
- Species: D. opisthoproctus

Binomial name
- Dysomma opisthoproctus Chen & Mok, 1995

Species of fish

Dysomma opisthoproctus is an eel in the family Synaphobranchidae (cutthroat eels). It was described by Chen Yu-Yun and Michael Hin-Kiu Mok in 1995. It is a subtropical, marine eel which is known only from northeastern Taiwan, in the northwestern Pacific Ocean. It is known to dwell at a maximum depth of 200 metres. Males are known to reach a total length of 42.1 centimetres.

The species epithet "opisthoproctus" refers to the posterior position of the anus, on the eel.
