= Synaphobranchus calvus =

Scientific classification
- Domain: Eukaryota
- Kingdom: Animalia
- Phylum: Chordata
- Class: Actinopterygii
- Order: Anguilliformes
- Family: Synaphobranchidae
- Genus: Synaphobranchus
- Species: S. calvus

Binomial name
- Synaphobranchus calvus Melo, 2007

Species of fish

Synaphobranchus calvus is an eel in the family Synaphobranchidae (cutthroat eels). It was described by Marcelo Roberto Souto de Melo in 2007.

The species epithet "calvus" means "bald" in Latin, and refers to the lack of scales on the eel's head. Males can reach a maximum total length of 68.5 centimetres (27.0 in).

It is a marine, tropical eel which is known from Brazil, in the southern Atlantic Ocean. It dwells at a depth range of 750 to 2,000 metres (2,460 to 6,560 ft).
