= Haptenchelys texis =

Scientific classification
- Domain: Eukaryota
- Kingdom: Animalia
- Phylum: Chordata
- Class: Actinopterygii
- Order: Anguilliformes
- Family: Synaphobranchidae
- Genus: Haptenchelys
- Species: H. texis

Binomial name
- Haptenchelys texis C. H. Robins & D. M. Martin, 1976

Species of fish

Haptenchelys texis is a species of deep-water eel in the family Synaphobranchidae. It is found in the Atlantic Ocean at depths of 2121 meters to 4086 meters.
