= Meadia roseni =

Scientific classification
- Domain: Eukaryota
- Kingdom: Animalia
- Phylum: Chordata
- Class: Actinopterygii
- Order: Anguilliformes
- Family: Synaphobranchidae
- Genus: Meadia
- Species: M. roseni

Binomial name
- Meadia roseni H. K. Mok, C. Y. Lee & H. J. Chan, 1991

Species of fish

Meadia roseni is an eel in the family Synaphobranchidae (cutthroat eels). It was described by Michael Hin-Kiu Mok, Chi-Ying Lee, and Hung-Jung Chan in 1991. It is a marine, deep water-dwelling eel which is known from Taiwan, in the northwestern Pacific Ocean. It is known to dwell at a depth of 1,020 metres (3,350 ft). Males can reach a maximum total length of 74.5 centimetres (29.3 in).

The species epithet refers to Donn Eric Rosen.
