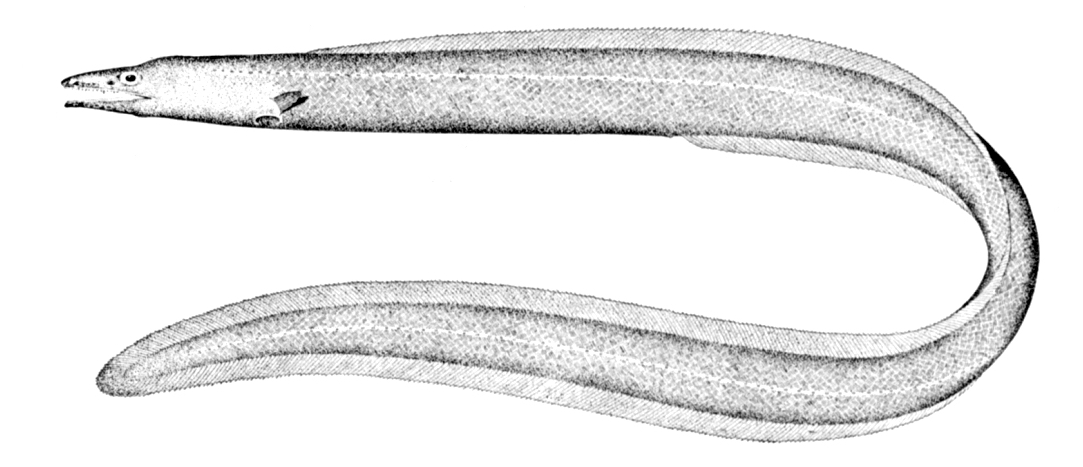
- Ilyophis brunneus

Scientific classification
- Kingdom: Animalia
- Phylum: Chordata
- Class: Actinopterygii
- Order: Anguilliformes
- Family: Synaphobranchidae
- Subfamily: Ilyophinae; D. S. Jordan & Davis, 1891

Genera
- see text

Synonyms
- Dysommatinae Gill, 1839

= Ilyophinae =

Subfamily of fishes

Ilyophinae, the arrowtooth ells or mustard eels, is a subfamily of marine ray-finned fishes belonging to the family Synaphobranchidae, the cutthroat eels. Within its family this subfamily shows greatest number of species and the greatest morphological diversity.

== Taxonomy ==
The Ilyophinae was first proposed as the family Ilyophididae in 1891 by the American ichthyologists David Starr Jordan and Bradley Moore Davis, this taxon has also been known as the Dysommidae, or Dysomminae, but this name was proposed by Theodore Gill but Jordan and Davi's name has priority. It is now regarded as a subfamily of the cutthroat eel family, Synaphobranchidae, within the eel order Anguilliformes.

== Etymology ==
Ilyophinae has a name based on that of its type genus Ilyophis, this name combines ilys which is Greek for "mud", probably an allusion to the soft, silty substrate habitat of I. brunneus, with ophis, meaning "serpent", referring to the snake-like shape of eels.

== Genera ==
The Ilyophinae contains the following genera:

- Atractodenchelys C.H. Robins & C. R. Robins, 1970
- Dysomma Alcock, 1889
- Dysommina Ginsburg, 1951
- Ilyophis Gilbert, 1891
- Linkenchelys D. G. Smith, 1989
- Meadia Böhlke, 1951
- Thermobiotes Geistdoerfer, 1991

== Characteristics ==
Ilyophinae eels are caharcterised by having a lower jaw that is shorter than the upper jaw. In most taxa the upper body lacks scales and in some Dysomma species as well as Thermobiotes do not have a pectoral fin. They have depressed, relatively rounded heads with some rather long teeth. These eels show very variable body shapes, dentition, whether they possess pectoral fins, the size of the eyes and the structure of the snout. In some species, the anus is positioned rather far forward on the body, almost beneath the pectoral fins, if any.

== Distribution and habitat ==
Ilyophinae eels are benthic species found in deeper waters in the Atlantic, Indian and Pacific Oceans. They are known to form large aggregations in seamounts and thermal vents, known as eel cities.
