= Dysomma longirostrum =

Scientific classification
- Domain: Eukaryota
- Kingdom: Animalia
- Phylum: Chordata
- Class: Actinopterygii
- Order: Anguilliformes
- Family: Synaphobranchidae
- Genus: Dysomma
- Species: D. longirostrum

Binomial name
- Dysomma longirostrum Chen & Mok, 2001

Species of fish

Dysomma longirostrum is an eel in the family Synaphobranchidae (cutthroat eels). It was described by Chen Yu-Yun and Michael Hin-Kiu Mok in 2001. It is a marine, temperate water-dwelling eel which is known from Taiwan, in the northwestern Pacific Ocean. It dwells at a depth range of 100–150 metres. Males can reach a maximum total length of 19.6 centimetres.

The species epithet refers to the eel's long snout.
