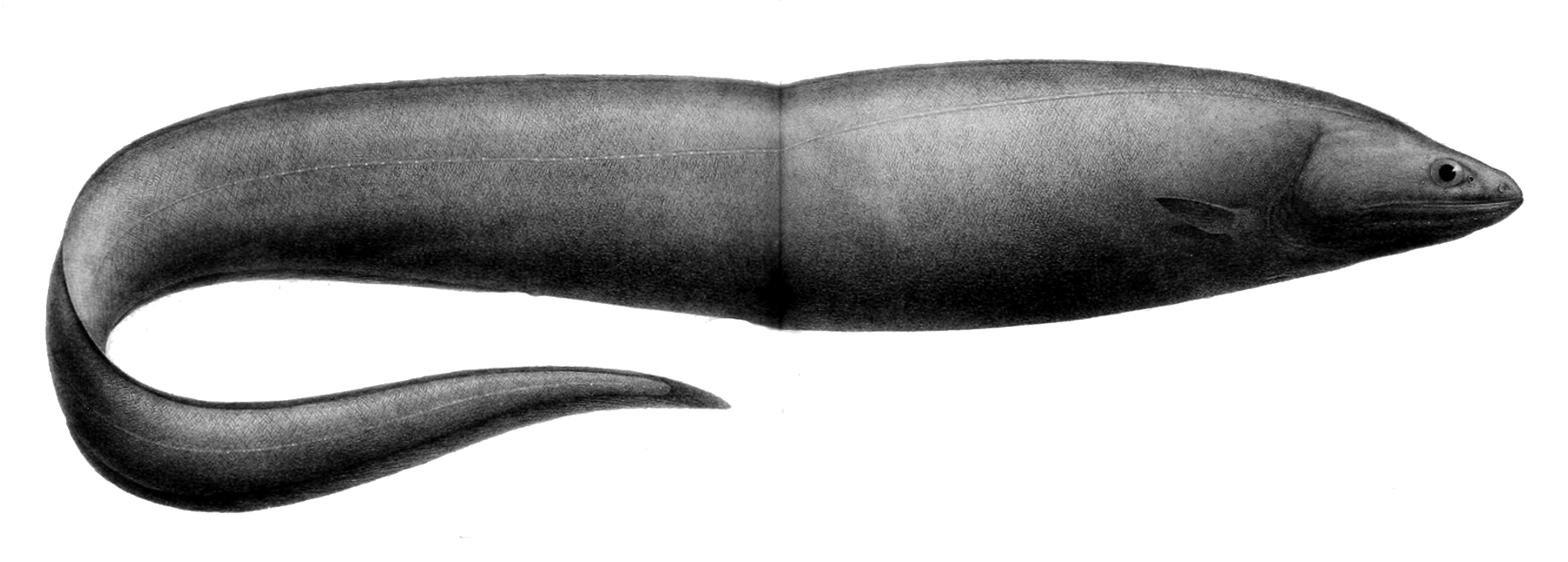

Scientific classification
- Kingdom: Animalia
- Phylum: Chordata
- Class: Actinopterygii
- Order: Anguilliformes
- Family: Synaphobranchidae
- Genus: Histiobranchus
- Species: H. bathybius

Binomial name
- Histiobranchus bathybius (Günther, 1877)

= Deepwater arrowtooth eel =

Species of fish

The deepwater arrowtooth eel (Histiobranchus bathybius), is a cutthroat eel of the genus Histiobranchus, found globally.
