= Synaphobranchus oregoni =

Conservation status
- Least Concern (IUCN 3.1)

Scientific classification
- Kingdom: Animalia
- Phylum: Chordata
- Class: Actinopterygii
- Order: Anguilliformes
- Family: Synaphobranchidae
- Genus: Synaphobranchus
- Species: S. oregoni

Binomial name
- Synaphobranchus oregoni Castle, 1960

Species of fish

Synaphobranchus oregoni is an eel in the family Synaphobranchidae (cutthroat eels). It was described by Peter Henry John Castle in 1960. It is a marine, deep water-dwelling eel which is known from the western central Atlantic Ocean, including the Bahamas, Trinidad and Tobago, Mexico, and the United States. It dwells at a depth range of 512 to 1,900 metres (1,680 to 6,234 ft). Males can reach a maximum total length of 111 centimetres (44 in).

Although little is known about the species' ecology, due to its deep water nature and its lack of known use in commercial trade, the IUCN redlist currently lists Synaphobranchus oregoni as Least Concern.
