= Dysomma melanurum =

Scientific classification
- Domain: Eukaryota
- Kingdom: Animalia
- Phylum: Chordata
- Class: Actinopterygii
- Order: Anguilliformes
- Family: Synaphobranchidae
- Genus: Dysomma
- Species: D. melanurum

Binomial name
- Dysomma melanurum Chen & Weng, 1967

Species of fish

Dysomma melanurum is an eel in the family Synaphobranchidae (cutthroat eels). It was described by Johnson T. F. Chen and Herman Ting-Chen Weng in 1967. It is a subtropical, marine eel which is known from the western Pacific Ocean. Males can reach a maximum total length of 23.7 centimetres.
