= Dysommina proboscideus =

Scientific classification
- Domain: Eukaryota
- Kingdom: Animalia
- Phylum: Chordata
- Class: Actinopterygii
- Order: Anguilliformes
- Family: Synaphobranchidae
- Genus: Dysommina
- Species: D. proboscideus

Binomial name
- Dysommina proboscideus (Lea, 1913)

Synonyms
- Leptocephalus proboscideus Lea, 1913

Species of fish

Dysommina proboscideus is an eel in the family Synaphobranchidae (cutthroat eels). It was described by Einar Hagbart Martin Lea in 1913. It is a subtropical, marine eel which is known from the eastern central Atlantic Ocean. It is known to dwell at a depth of 150 metres.
