= Dysomma dolichosomatum =

Scientific classification
- Domain: Eukaryota
- Kingdom: Animalia
- Phylum: Chordata
- Class: Actinopterygii
- Order: Anguilliformes
- Family: Synaphobranchidae
- Genus: Dysomma
- Species: D. dolichosomatum

Binomial name
- Dysomma dolichosomatum Karrer, 1983

Species of fish

Dysomma dolichosomatum is an eel in the family Synaphobranchidae (cutthroat eels). It was described by Christine Karrer in 1983. It is a tropical, marine eel which is known from the Indo-Pacific. It dwells at a depth range of 550–555 metres.
