= Atractodenchelys phrix =

Scientific classification
- Kingdom: Animalia
- Phylum: Chordata
- Class: Actinopterygii
- Order: Anguilliformes
- Family: Synaphobranchidae
- Genus: Atractodenchelys
- Species: A. phrix

Binomial name
- Atractodenchelys phrix C. R. Robins & C. H. Robins, 1970

Species of fish

Atractodenchelys phrix, known under the common name "arrowtooth eel" is an eel in the family Synaphobranchidae (cutthroat eels). It was described by Catherine H. Robins and C. Richard Robins in 1970. It is a marine, deep water-dwelling eel which is known from its type locality in the eastern Caribbean, in the western central Atlantic Ocean. It is known to dwell at a depth range of 385–425 metres.
