= Dysomma fuscoventralis =

Scientific classification
- Domain: Eukaryota
- Kingdom: Animalia
- Phylum: Chordata
- Class: Actinopterygii
- Order: Anguilliformes
- Family: Synaphobranchidae
- Genus: Dysomma
- Species: D. fuscoventralis

Binomial name
- Dysomma fuscoventralis Karrer & Klausewitz, 1982

Species of fish

Dysomma fuscoventralis is an eel in the family Synaphobranchidae (cutthroat eels). It was described by Christine Karrer and Wolfgang Klausewitz in 1982. It is a marine, deep water-dwelling eel which is endemic to the Red Sea. It dwells at a depth range of 750–1425 metres.
