= Dysomma muciparus =

Scientific classification
- Kingdom: Animalia
- Phylum: Chordata
- Class: Actinopterygii
- Order: Anguilliformes
- Family: Synaphobranchidae
- Genus: Dysomma
- Species: D. muciparus

Binomial name
- Dysomma muciparus (Alcock, 1891)

Synonyms
- Dysommopsis muciparus Alcock, 1891

Species of fish

Dysomma muciparus is an eel in the family Synaphobranchidae (cutthroat eels). It was described by Alfred William Alcock in 1891. It is a tropical, marine eel which is known from the Indo-Pacific. It is known to dwell at a depth range of 439–505 metres.
