= Dysomma bucephalus =

Scientific classification
- Kingdom: Animalia
- Phylum: Chordata
- Class: Actinopterygii
- Order: Anguilliformes
- Family: Synaphobranchidae
- Genus: Dysomma
- Species: D. bucephalus

Binomial name
- Dysomma bucephalus Alcock, 1889

Species of fish

Dysomma bucephalus is an eel in the family Synaphobranchidae (cutthroat eels). It was described by Alfred William Alcock in 1889. It is a tropical, marine eel which is known from the Indo-Pacific. It is known to dwell at a maximum depth of 353 metres.
