= Histiobranchus australis =

Scientific classification
- Kingdom: Animalia
- Phylum: Chordata
- Class: Actinopterygii
- Order: Anguilliformes
- Family: Synaphobranchidae
- Genus: Histiobranchus
- Species: H. australis

Binomial name
- Histiobranchus australis (Regan, 1913)

Synonyms
- Synaphobranchus australis Regan, 1913

Species of fish

Histiobranchus australis, the southern cut-throat eel is an eel in the family Synaphobranchidae (cutthroat eels). It was described by Regan in 1913. It is a marine, deep water-dwelling eel which is known from the southern Atlantic, Indian, and Pacific Ocean. It dwells at a depth range of 950 to 3,001 metres (3,117 to 9,846 ft), and leads a benthic lifestyle. Males can reach a maximum total length of 62.8 centimetres (24.7 in), while females can reach a maximum TL of 67.0 centimetres (26.4 in).
