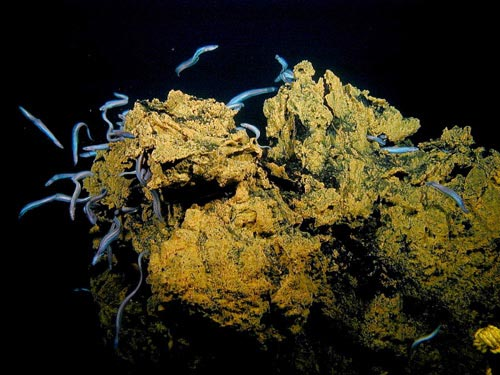
- "Eel City"

Scientific classification
- Kingdom: Animalia
- Phylum: Chordata
- Class: Actinopterygii
- Order: Anguilliformes
- Family: Synaphobranchidae
- Genus: Dysommina
- Species: D. rugosa

Binomial name
- Dysommina rugosa Ginsburg, 1951

= Dysommina rugosa =

Species of fish

Dysommina rugosa is an eel in the family Synaphobranchidae (cutthroat eels). It was described by Isaac Ginsburg in 1951. It is a marine, deep water-dwelling eel which is known from the western Atlantic and eastern central Pacific Ocean. It dwells at a depth range of 260–775 metres, and is found off the continental slope. Males can reach a maximum total length of 37 centimetres.

== Description ==
D. rugosa is a fairly stout elongated cylindrical fish growing to a total length of about 350 mm (14 in). The snout is fleshy with a number of papillae and tapers towards the front, overhanging the lower jaw. There are two pairs of nostrils, one pair at the tip of the snout and the other pair between the eyes, which are large and circular and covered with skin. There are no premaxillary teeth and the maxillary and dentary teeth are tiny and arranged in a number of irregular rows. The roof of the mouth has four large, compound vomerine teeth. The gill openings are crescent-shaped and about the same size as the eyes. The origin of the dorsal fin is further back than the origin of the pectoral fins. The dorsal and anal fins are confluent with the small caudal fin. The ventral surface of this fish is darker than the head and dorsal surface, and the pectoral, dorsal and anal fins are pale with yellowish-white edges.

== Distribution and habitat ==
The species occurs in the tropical western Atlantic Ocean, the Caribbean Sea and Gulf of Mexico as well as the eastern and central Pacific Ocean and Hawaii. It is a deepwater species found near the seabed on the continental slope at depths between 260 and 775 m (850 and 2,540 ft).

=== Eel City ===
In 2005, during underwater exploration of the caldera of Vailulu'u volcano at a depth of about 700 m (2,300 ft) in the mid-Pacific, it was found that large numbers of Dysommina rugosa were present in low-temperature hydrothermal vents at a locality the researchers dubbed Eel City. It is unique because most hydrothermal vents are predominantly inhabited by invertebrates, whereas there is little invertebrate life in Eel City.

This area had pillow lava flows draped with yellowish microbial mats, and whenever the submersible touched down, previously hidden eels swarmed into the water column. It is thought that the eels hide in crevices in the yellow mats for their own protection and feed on planktonic crustaceans drifting past.

Preliminary work indicates that they use the vent only as a place to live. They seem to feed not on chemosynthetic bacteria, but on crustaceans that pass by Nafanua's summit in the currents.

During the initial dive in March 2005, one of the discoverers, Hubert Staudigel (a geologist at San Diego's Scripps Institution of Oceanography), commented "I suppose it's possible they migrate up the water column and feed in the water column and migrate back down to the cracks and crevices to hang out. But it seems odd that a deep-sea fish that would normally be experiencing 2- to 5-degree Celsius (35.6 degrees to 41 degrees Fahrenheit) water would be seeking out water that is warmer."
