= Bruun's cutthroat eel =

- Drawing by Dr Tony Ayling

Scientific classification
- Kingdom: Animalia
- Phylum: Chordata
- Class: Actinopterygii
- Order: Anguilliformes
- Family: Synaphobranchidae
- Genus: Histiobranchus
- Species: H. bruuni

Binomial name
- Histiobranchus bruuni Castle, 1964

Species of fish

Bruun's cutthroat eel (Histiobranchus bruuni) is a cutthroat eel of the genus Histiobranchus, found around New Zealand at the bottom of the deep ocean basin at depths of between 4,000 and 5,000 m. Their length is between 40 and 60 cm.
