= Meadia abyssalis =

Scientific classification
- Domain: Eukaryota
- Kingdom: Animalia
- Phylum: Chordata
- Class: Actinopterygii
- Order: Anguilliformes
- Family: Synaphobranchidae
- Genus: Meadia
- Species: M. abyssalis

Binomial name
- Meadia abyssalis (Kamohara, 1938)

Synonyms
- Dysomma abyssale Kamohara, 1938; Meadia abyssale (Kamohara, 1938); Media abyssalis (Kamohara, 1938)

Species of fish

Meadia abyssalis, the abyssal cutthroat eel, is an eel in the family Synaphobranchidae (cutthroat eels). It was described by Toshiji Kamohara in 1938. It is a marine, deep water-dwelling eel which is known from the Indo-Pacific, including Brazil, the Hancock Seamount, the Hawaiian and Society islands, Japan, Mauritius, and Réunion. It is found off the continental slope, and dwells at a depth range of 100–329 metres. Males can reach a maximum total length of 73 centimetres.
