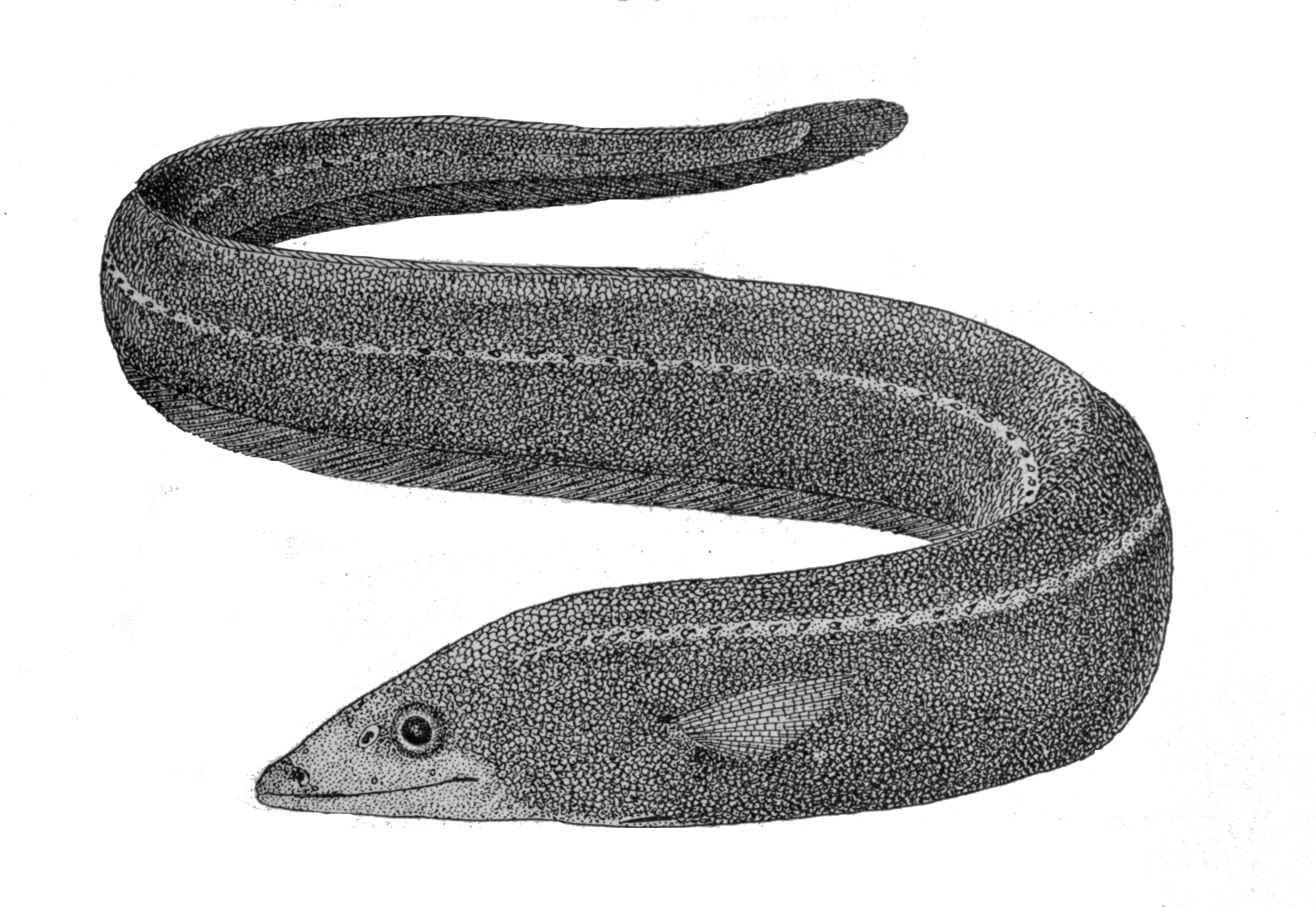

Scientific classification
- Domain: Eukaryota
- Kingdom: Animalia
- Phylum: Chordata
- Class: Actinopterygii
- Order: Anguilliformes
- Family: Synaphobranchidae
- Genus: Synaphobranchus
- Species: S. brevidorsalis

Binomial name
- Synaphobranchus brevidorsalis Günther, 1887

Synonyms
- Synaphobranchus pinnatus var. brevidorsalis Lloyd, 1909

= Shortdorsal cutthroat eel =

Species of fish

The shortdorsal cutthroat eel (Synaphobranchus brevidorsalis, also known commonly as the shortfin cut-throat eel) is an eel in the family Synaphobranchidae (cutthroat eels). It was described by Albert Günther in 1887. It is a marine, deep water-dwelling eel which is known from the Indo-Pacific and western central Atlantic Ocean, including Zanzibar, Maldives, Australia, Japan, Suriname, and the Gulf of Mexico. It dwells at a depth range of 900 to 3,000 metres (3,000 to 9,800 ft), most often between 1,000 to 2,500 metres (3,300 to 8,200 ft), and leads a benthic lifestyle, inhabiting the continental slope. Males can reach a maximum total length of 111 centimetres (44 in).
