= Synaphobranchus dolichorhynchus =

Scientific classification
- Domain: Eukaryota
- Kingdom: Animalia
- Phylum: Chordata
- Class: Actinopterygii
- Order: Anguilliformes
- Family: Synaphobranchidae
- Genus: Synaphobranchus
- Species: S. dolichorhynchus

Binomial name
- Synaphobranchus dolichorhynchus (Lea, 1913)

Synonyms
- Leptocephalus dolichorhynchus Lea, 1913

Species of fish

Synaphobranchus dolichorhynchus is an eel in the family Synaphobranchidae (cutthroat eels). It was described by Einar Hagbart Martin Lea in 1913, originally under the genus Leptocephalus. It is a marine, subtropical eel which is known solely from larval specimens discovered in the northern Atlantic Ocean. It is known to dwell at a depth range of 100 to 150 metres (330 to 490 ft).
