= Dysomma brevirostre =

Scientific classification
- Kingdom: Animalia
- Phylum: Chordata
- Class: Actinopterygii
- Order: Anguilliformes
- Family: Synaphobranchidae
- Genus: Dysomma
- Species: D. brevirostre

Binomial name
- Dysomma brevirostre (Facciolà, 1887)

Synonyms
- Nettastoma brevirostre Facciolà, 1887; Todarus brevirostre (Facciolà, 1887); Nettodarus brevirostris (Facciolà, 1887); Leptocephalus telescopicus Schmidt, 1913

Species of fish

Dysomma brevirostre, the pignosed arrowtooth eel or batnose eel, is an eel in the family Synaphobranchidae (cutthroat eels). It was described by Luigi Facciolà in 1887. It is a marine, deep water-dwelling eel which is known from the eastern and western Atlantic Ocean, including Madeira Island, the Gulf of Guinea, the Ligurian Sea, Italy, and Florida and Hawaii, USA. It dwells at a depth range of 200 to 1,000 metres (660 to 3,280 ft), and inhabits soft sediments on the continental slope. Males can reach a maximum total length of 30 centimetres (12 in).
