= Dysomma tridens =

Scientific classification
- Kingdom: Animalia
- Phylum: Chordata
- Class: Actinopterygii
- Order: Anguilliformes
- Family: Synaphobranchidae
- Genus: Dysomma
- Species: D. tridens

Binomial name
- Dysomma tridens C. H. Robins, E. B. Böhlke & C. R. Robins, 1989

Species of fish

Dysomma tridens is an eel in the family Synaphobranchidae (cutthroat eels). It was described by Catherine H. Robins, Eugenia Brandt Böhlke, and C. Richard Robins in 1989. It is a tropical, marine eel which is known from off Belize, in the western central Atlantic Ocean. It is known to dwell at a maximum depth of 348 metres.
