= Atractodenchelys robinsorum =

Scientific classification
- Kingdom: Animalia
- Phylum: Chordata
- Class: Actinopterygii
- Order: Anguilliformes
- Family: Synaphobranchidae
- Genus: Atractodenchelys
- Species: A. robinsorum

Binomial name
- Atractodenchelys robinsorum Karmovskaya, 2003

Species of fish

Atractodenchelys robinsorum is an eel in the family Synaphobranchidae (cutthroat eels). It was described by Emma Stanislavovna Karmovskaya in 2003. It is a marine, deep water-dwelling eel which is known from the Chesterfield Islands in the southwestern Pacific Ocean. It is known to dwell at a depth of 710 metres.
