= Linkenchelys =

Conservation status
- Data Deficient (IUCN 3.1)

Scientific classification
- Kingdom: Animalia
- Phylum: Chordata
- Class: Actinopterygii
- Order: Anguilliformes
- Family: Synaphobranchidae
- Subfamily: Ilyophinae
- Genus: Linkenchelys; D. G. Smith, 1989
- Species: L. multipora

Binomial name
- Linkenchelys multipora D. G. Smith, 1989

Species of fish

Linkenchelys is a monospecific genus marine ray-finned fish belonging to the family Synaphobranchidae, the cutthroat eels. The only species in the genus is Linkenelchys multipora which is only known from around the Bahamas at around 228 m (748 ft).
