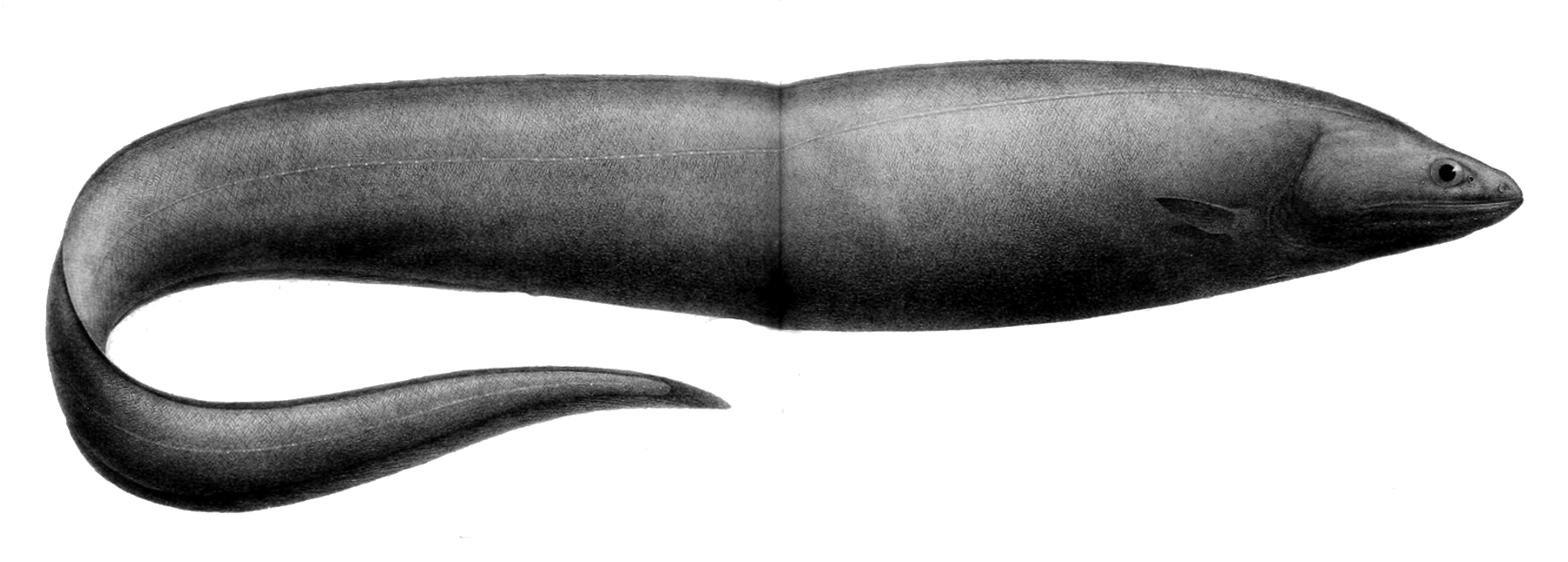

Scientific classification
- Kingdom: Animalia
- Phylum: Chordata
- Class: Actinopterygii
- Order: Anguilliformes
- Family: Synaphobranchidae
- Subfamily: Synaphobranchinae
- Genus: Histiobranchus; T. N. Gill, 1883

Species
- See text

= Histiobranchus =

Genus of fishes

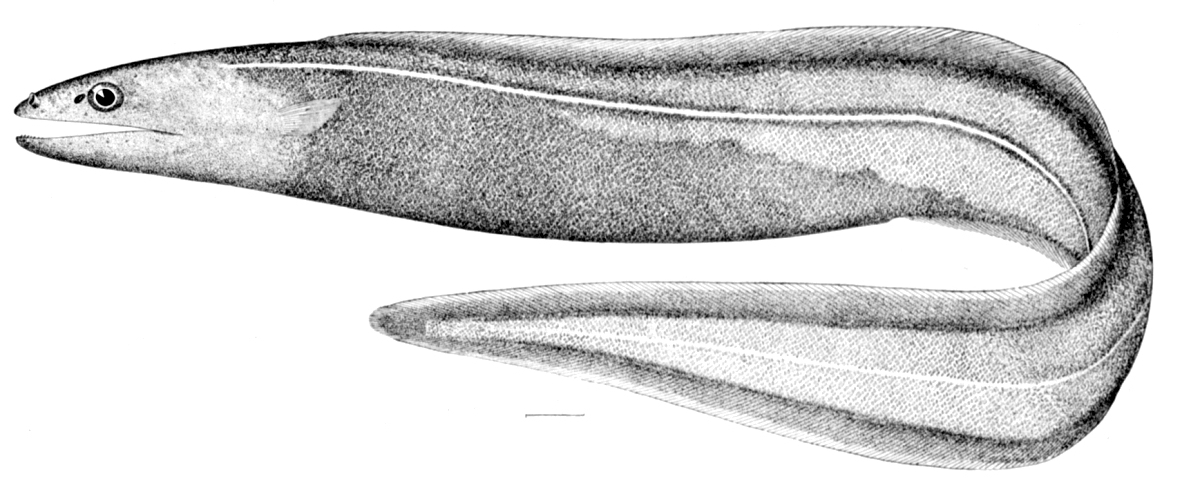
Histiobranchus bathybius

Histiobranchus is a genus of eels in the family Synaphobranchidae.

It currently contains the following species:

- Histiobranchus australis (Regan, 1913)
- Histiobranchus bathybius (Günther, 1877) (deepwater arrowtooth eel)
- Histiobranchus bruuni Castle, 1964 (Bruun's cutthroat eel)

Synonyms

- Histiobranchus infernalis Gill, 1883; valid as Histiobranchus bathybius
