= Meadia =

Scientific classification
- Kingdom: Animalia
- Phylum: Chordata
- Class: Actinopterygii
- Order: Anguilliformes
- Family: Synaphobranchidae
- Subfamily: Ilyophinae
- Genus: Meadia; J. E. Böhlke, 1951

Type species
- Dysomma abyssale Kamohara, 1938

Species
- See text

Genus of fishes

Meadia is a genus of eels in the cutthroat eel family Synaphobranchidae. It currently contains the following species:

- Meadia abyssalis (Kamohara, 1938) (abyssal cutthroat eel)
- Meadia roseni H. K. Mok, C. Y. Lee & H. J. Chan, 1991
- Meadia minor V.-Q. Vo & H.-C. Ho, 2021 (small cutthroat eel)
