= Atractodenchelys =

Scientific classification
- Kingdom: Animalia
- Phylum: Chordata
- Class: Actinopterygii
- Order: Anguilliformes
- Family: Synaphobranchidae
- Subfamily: Ilyophinae
- Genus: Atractodenchelys; C. H. Robins & C. R. Robins, 1970

Species
- See text.

Genus of fishes

Atractodenchelys is a genus of eels in the cutthroat eel family, Synaphobranchidae.

== Species ==
There are currently three recognized species in this genus:

- Atractodenchelys brevitrunca Vo & Ho, 2020
- Atractodenchelys phrix C. H. Robins & C. R. Robins, 1970
- Atractodenchelys robinsorum Karmovskaya, 2003
