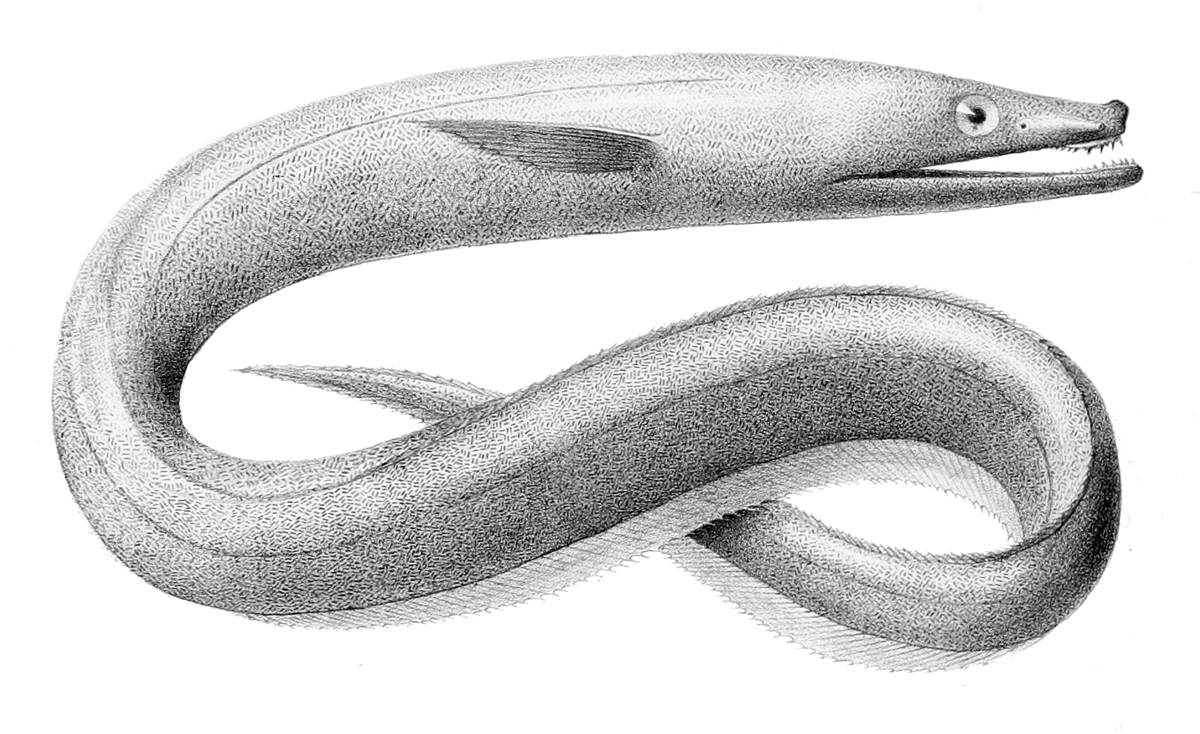

Conservation status
- Least Concern (IUCN 3.1)

Scientific classification
- Kingdom: Animalia
- Phylum: Chordata
- Class: Actinopterygii
- Order: Anguilliformes
- Family: Synaphobranchidae
- Genus: Synaphobranchus
- Species: S. kaupii

Binomial name
- Synaphobranchus kaupii Johnson, 1862

Synonyms
- Synaphobranchus kaupi Johnson, 1862; Nettophichthys retropinnatus Holt, 1891

= Kaup's arrowtooth eel =

Species of fish

The Kaup's arrowtooth eel (Synaphobranchus kaupii), also known as the Kaup's cut-throat eel, the Gray's cutthroat, the Longnosed eel, the Northern cutthroat eel, or the Slatjaw cutthroat eel) is an eel in the family Synaphobranchidae (cutthroat eels). It was described by James Yate Johnson in 1862. It is a marine, deep water-dwelling eel which is known from the Indo-Western Pacific and eastern and western Atlantic Ocean, including the Faroe Islands, Iceland, Cape Verde, the Western Sahara, Nigeria, Namibia, South Africa, Greenland, France, Saint Pierre and Miquelon, the United Kingdom, Ireland, the Philippines, Portugal, Spain, the Bahamas, Brazil, Canada, Cuba, Japan, Australia, Mauritania, Morocco, and Hawaii. It dwells at a depth range of 120 to 4,800 metres (390 to 15,750 ft), most often between 400 and 2,200 metres (1,300 and 7,200 ft), and inhabits the upper abyssal zone on the continental slope. It is intolerant of the temperatures of higher waters. Males can reach a maximum total length of 100 centimetres (39 in).

The common name and species epithet "kaupii" refer to naturalist Johann Jakob Kaup. The Kaup's arrowtooth eel is preyed on by Coryphaenoides rupestris. Its own diet consists of benthic crustaceans including decapods and amphipods, planktonic crustaceans including euphausiids and mysids, cephalopods including species of Rossia, and bony fish including Macroramphosus scolopax. It is of no commercial interest to fisheries, but it is sometimes caught as by-catch by bottom longline and baited fish traps.

Due to the widespread distribution of the species and its abundance in many regions, the IUCN redlist currently lists the Kaup's arrowtooth eel as Least Concern.
