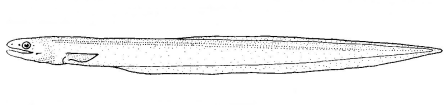
- Drawing by Dr Tony Ayling

Conservation status
- Vulnerable (IUCN 3.1)

Scientific classification
- Kingdom: Animalia
- Phylum: Chordata
- Class: Actinopterygii
- Division: Teleostei
- Order: Anguilliformes
- Family: Synaphobranchidae
- Subfamily: Synaphobranchinae
- Genus: Diastobranchus; Barnard, 1923
- Species: D. capensis

Binomial name
- Diastobranchus capensis Barnard, 1923

= Basketwork eel =

Species of fish

The basketwork eel, Diastobranchus capensis, is a cutthroat eel, the only species in the genus Diastobranchus. It is found off southern Australia, South Africa, and around New Zealand, in depths over 1,000 m. Its length is between 80 and 120 cm.
