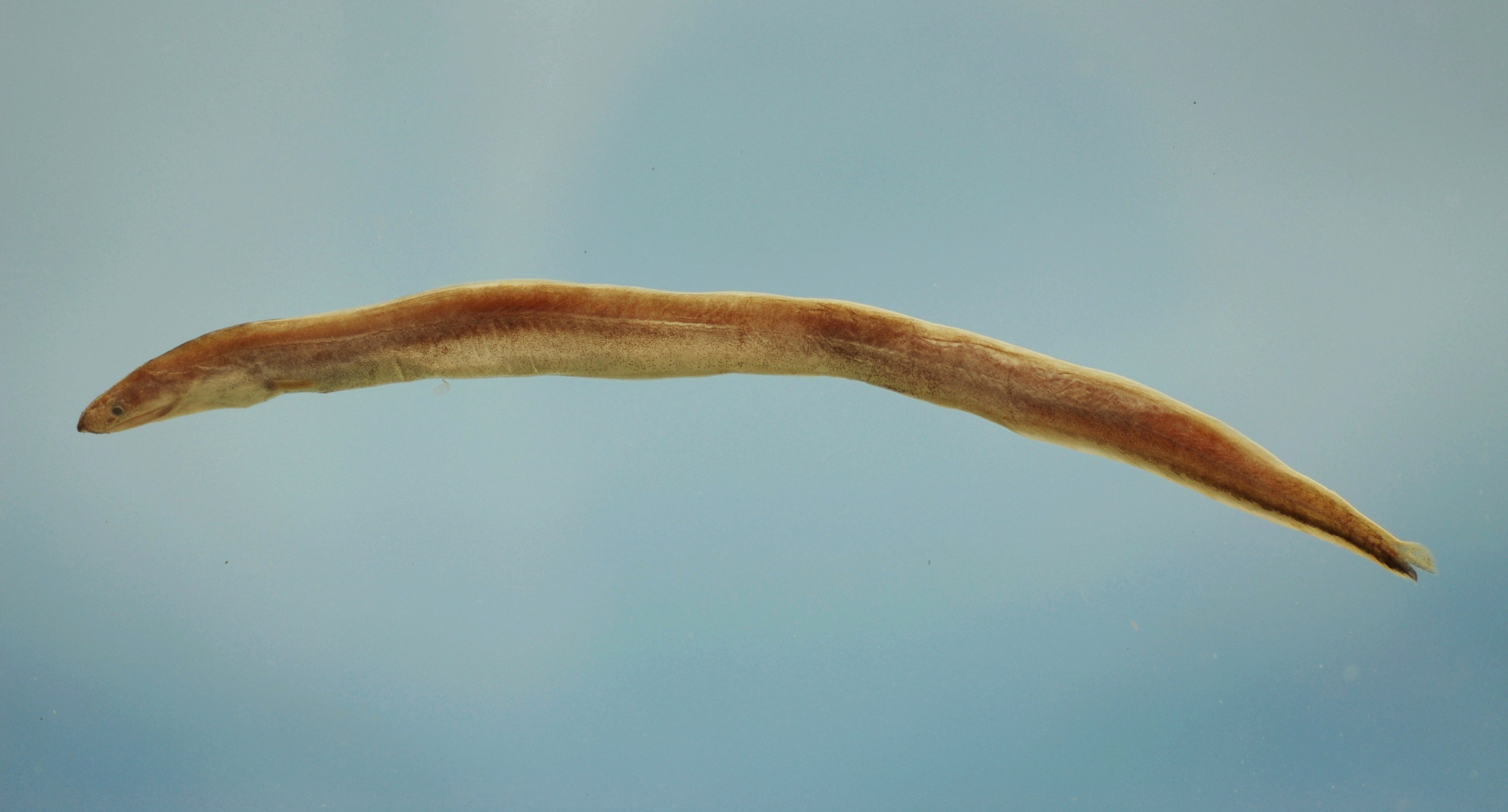
- Dysomma anguillare

Scientific classification
- Kingdom: Animalia
- Phylum: Chordata
- Class: Actinopterygii
- Order: Anguilliformes
- Family: Synaphobranchidae
- Subfamily: Ilyophinae
- Genus: Dysomma; Alcock, 1889

Type species
- Dysomma bucephalus Alcock, 1889

Synonyms
- Dysommopsis Alcock, 1891; Nettodarus Whitley, 1951; Sinomyrus S.-Y. Lin, 1933; Todarus Grassi & Calandruccio, 1896

= Dysomma =

Genus of fishes

Dysomma is a genus of marine ray-finned fishes belonging to the family Synaphobranchidae, the cutthroat eels. These eels are found in the Atlantic, Indian and Pacific Oceans.

== Species ==
There are currently 21 recognized species in this genus:

- Dysomma achiropteryx Prokofiev, 2019
- Dysomma alticorpus Fricke, Golani, Appelbaum-Golani & Zajonz, 2018 (pale cutthroat eel)
- Dysomma anguillare Barnard, 1923 (short-belly arrowtooth eel)
- Dysomma brachygnathos H. C. Ho & Tighe, 2018 (short-jaw cutthroat eel)
- Dysomma brevirostre (Facciolà, 1887) (pig-nosed arrowtooth eel)
- Dysomma bucephalus Alcock, 1889
- Dysomma bussarawiti Prokofiev, 2019
- Dysomma dolichosomatum Karrer, 1982
- Dysomma formosa H. C. Ho & Tighe, 2018 (white cutthroat eel)
- Dysomma fuscoventralis Karrer & Klausewitz, 1982
- Dysomma goslinei C. H. Robins & C. R. Robins, 1976
- Dysomma intermedium Vo & Ho, 2024
- Dysomma longirostrum Y. Y. Chen & H. K. Mok, 2001
- Dysomma melanurum J. S. T. F. Chen & H. T. C. Weng, 1967
- Dysomma muciparus (Alcock, 1891)
- Dysomma opisthoproctus Y. Y. Chen & H. K. Mok, 1995
- Dysomma phuketense Prokofiev, 2019
- Dysomma polycatodon Karrer, 1982
- Dysomma robinsorum H. C. Ho & Tighe, 2018 (Robinses' cutthroat eel)
- Dysomma taiwanensis H. C. Ho, D. G. Smith & Tighe, 2015 (Taiwanese arrowtooth eel)
- Dysomma tridens C. H. Robins, E. B. Böhlke & C. R. Robins, 1989
