= Thermobiotes =

Conservation status
- Least Concern (IUCN 3.1)

Scientific classification
- Kingdom: Animalia
- Phylum: Chordata
- Class: Actinopterygii
- Order: Anguilliformes
- Family: Synaphobranchidae
- Subfamily: Ilyophinae
- Genus: Thermobiotes; Geistdoerfer, 1991
- Species: T. mytilogeiton

Binomial name
- Thermobiotes mytilogeiton Geistdoerfer, 1991

Species of fish

Thermobiotes is a monospecific genus marine ray-finned fish belonging to the family Synaphobranchidae, the cutthroat eels. Its only species is Thermobiotes mytilogeiton which is a species of deep-water eel and is so far known only from the Vai Lili hydrothermal vent area in the western central Pacific Ocean at a depth of 1,750 m (5,740 ft).
