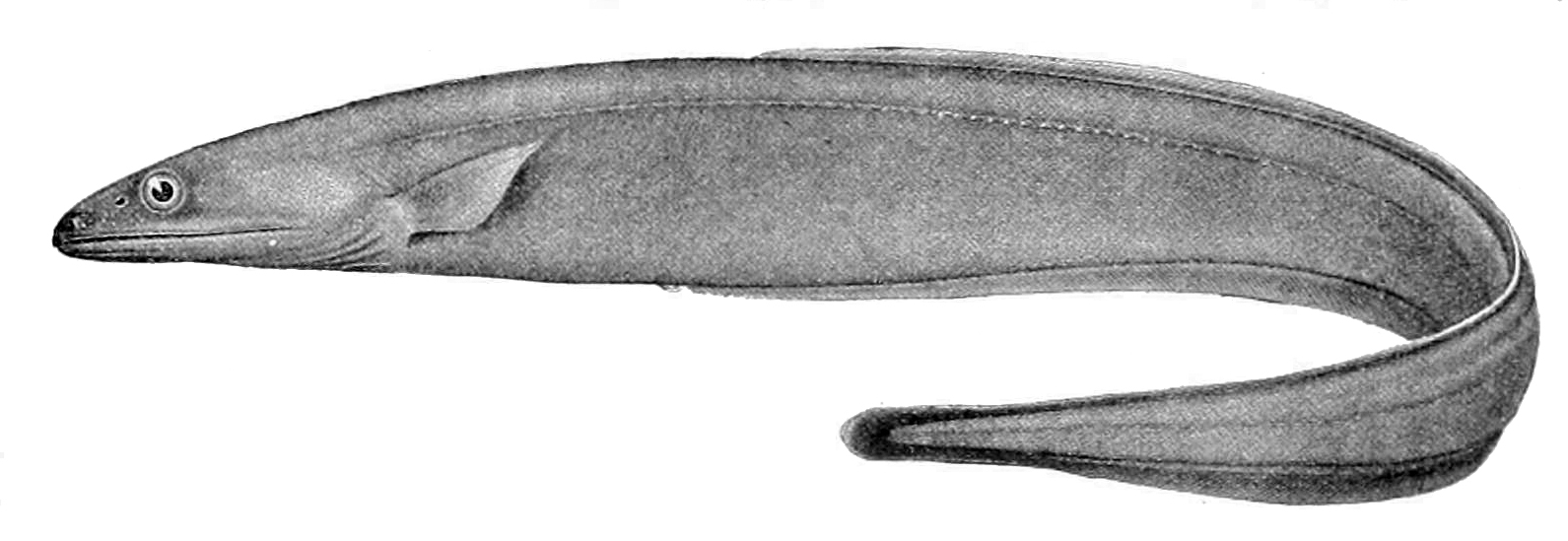
- Synaphobranchus affinis

Scientific classification
- Kingdom: Animalia
- Phylum: Chordata
- Class: Actinopterygii
- Order: Anguilliformes
- Family: Synaphobranchidae
- Subfamily: Synaphobranchinae
- Genus: Synaphobranchus; J. Y. Johnson, 1862

Species
- See text.

= Synaphobranchus =

Genus of fishes

Synaphobranchus is a genus of eels in the cutthroat eel family, Synaphobranchidae. It currently contains the following species:

- Synaphobranchus affinis Günther, 1877 (Grey cutthroat eel)
- Synaphobranchus brevidorsalis Günther, 1887 (Shortdorsal cutthroat eel)
- Synaphobranchus calvus M. R. S. de Melo, 2007
- Synaphobranchus dolichorhynchus (E. H. M. Lea, 1913)
- Synaphobranchus kaupii J. Y. Johnson, 1862 (Kaup's arrowtooth eel)
- Synaphobranchus oligolepis Ho, Hong & Chen, 2018
- Synaphobranchus oregoni Castle, 1960

== Bibliography ==
- Froese, Rainer; Pauly, Daniel (eds.). "Species in genus Synaphobranchus". FishBase. June 2011 version.
