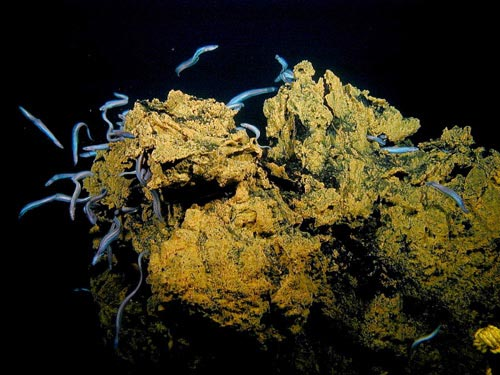

Scientific classification
- Kingdom: Animalia
- Phylum: Chordata
- Class: Actinopterygii
- Order: Anguilliformes
- Family: Synaphobranchidae
- Subfamily: Ilyophinae
- Genus: Dysommina; Ginsburg, 1951

Type species
- Dysommina rugosa Ginsburg, 1951

Species
- See text

= Dysommina =

Genus of fishes

Dysommina is a genus of marine ray-finned fishes belonging to the family Synaphobranchidae, the cutthroat eels. These eels are known from the Atlantic and Pacific Oceans.

== Species ==
Dysommina currently contains the following species:

- Dysommina brevis V.-Q. Vo & H.-C. Ho, 2024
- Dysommina orientalis Tighe, H.-C. Ho & Hatooka, 2018
- Dysommina proboscideus (E. H. M. Lea, 1913)
- Dysommina pygmaea Tighe & Pogonoski, 2025
- Dysommina rugosa Ginsburg, 1951

In 2005 an Eel City was discovered, this is an unusual community of Dysommina rugosa on the summit of Vailulu'u submarine volcano.
