= Haptenchelys =

Scientific classification
- Kingdom: Animalia
- Phylum: Chordata
- Class: Actinopterygii
- Order: Anguilliformes
- Family: Synaphobranchidae
- Subfamily: Synaphobranchinae
- Genus: Haptenchelys; C. H. Robins & D. M. Martin, 1976

Genus of fishes

Haptenchelys is a genus of deep-water eel in the family Synaphobranchidae. It contains two species. It is found in the Atlantic Ocean and Pacific Ocean at depths of 2,121 to 4,836 metres (7,000 to 16,000 ft).

== Species ==
There are currently 2 recognized species in this genus:

- Haptenchelys parviocularis Tashiro & Shinohara, 2014 (small-eyed abyssal eel)
- Haptenchelys texis C. H. Robins & D. M. Martin, 1976
