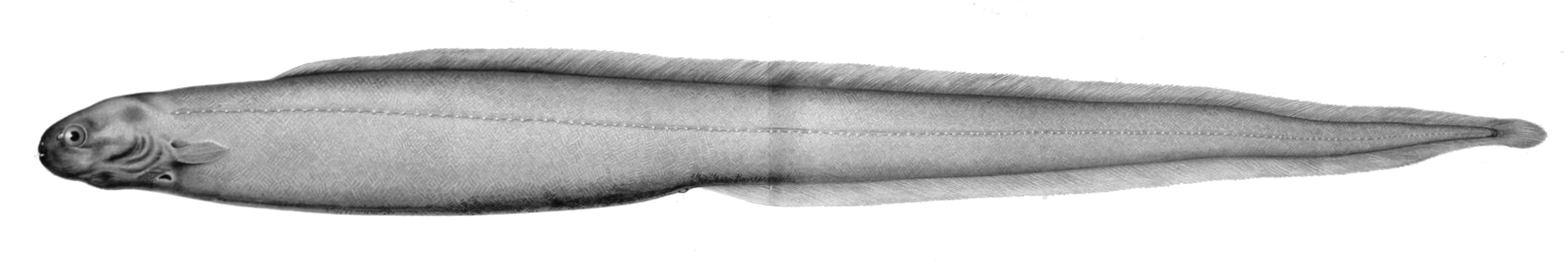

Scientific classification
- Kingdom: Animalia
- Phylum: Chordata
- Class: Actinopterygii
- Order: Anguilliformes
- Family: Synaphobranchidae
- Subfamily: Simenchelyinae
- Genus: Simenchelys; T. N. Gill in Goode and Bean, 1879
- Species: S. parasitica

Binomial name
- Simenchelys parasitica T. N. Gill in Goode and Bean, 1879

Synonyms
- Conchognathus grimaldii Collett, 1889; Gymnosimenchelys leptosomus Tanaka, 1908; Simenchelys dofleini Franz, 1910

= Snubnosed eel =

Species of fish

The snubnosed eel, Simenchelys parasitica, also known as the pug-nosed eel, slime eel, or snub-nose parasitic eel, is a species of deep-sea eel and the only member of its genus. Some authors classify it as the sole member of the subfamily Simenchelyinae of the family Synaphobranchidae, or cutthroat eels, while others place it in its own monotypic family, the Simenchelyidae. It is found in the Atlantic and Pacific Oceans, typically at a depth of 500–1,800 m (1,600–5,900 ft) near the bottom. Although typically a scavenger, it is better known for using its powerful jaws and teeth to burrow into larger fishes as a parasite. This species is harmless to humans and of no interest to fisheries. The generic name Simenchelys translates literally as "pug-nosed eel".

== Distribution and habitat ==
In the eastern Atlantic, the snubnosed eel is known from France to Madeira and the Azores, as well as from off Cape Verde and South Africa. In the western Atlantic, it has been captured off the coast of the United States. In the Pacific, it occurs off Japan, Australia, New Zealand, and Hawaii. They have been recorded from 136 to 2,620 m (446 to 8,596 ft), but are usually found between 500 and 1,800 m (1,600 and 5,900 ft) on the continental slope, in water temperatures of 4–9 °C (39–48 °F). At some locations, large numbers of snubnosed eels have been caught over a short time, indicating local abundance or schooling behavior.

== Description ==
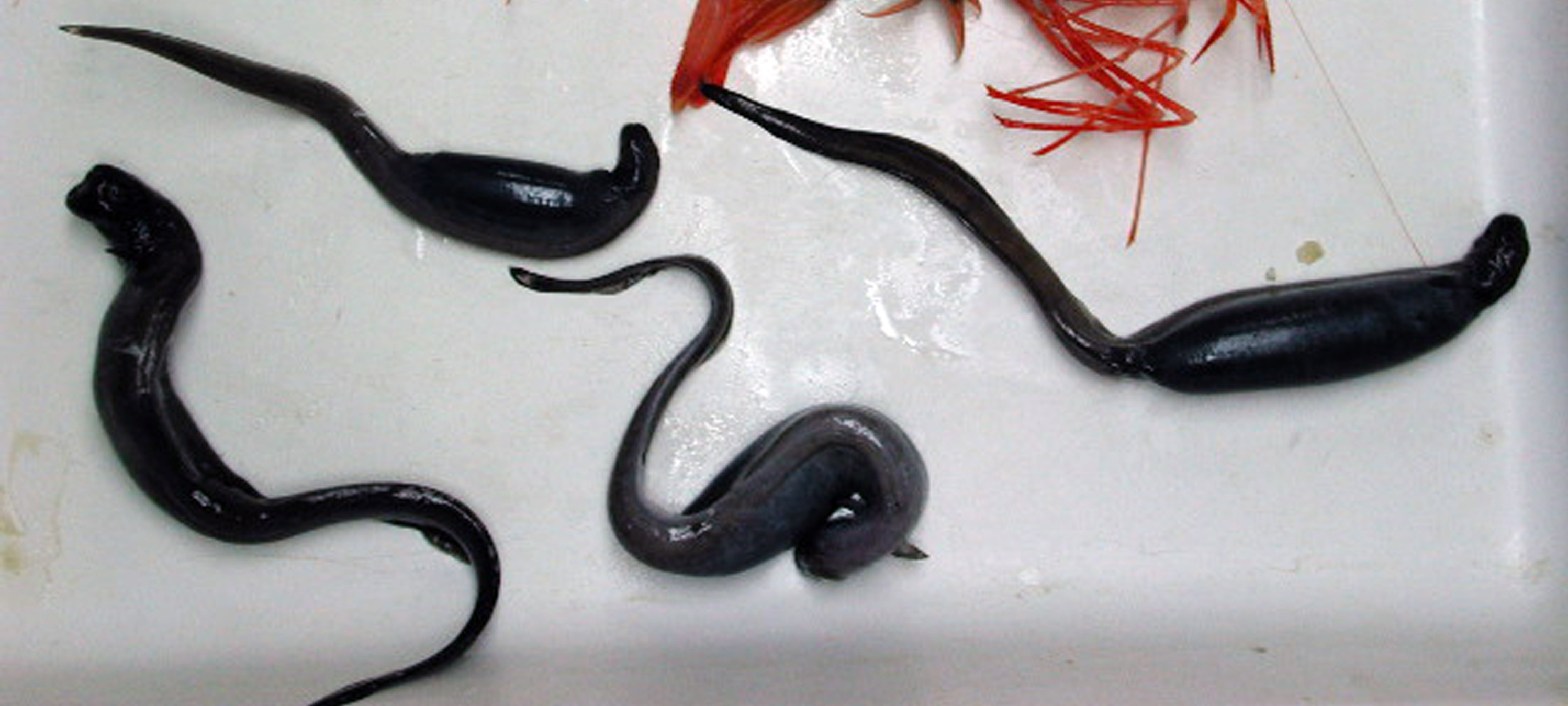
Snubnosed eels caught from a scavenger trap off Hawaii.

The snubnosed eel has a long, stout body that is strongly compressed posterior of the vent. The head is thick and cylindrical, with a short, blunt snout. The mouth is distinctive, consisting of a tiny horizontal slit surrounded by strongly plicate lips. The jaws are short and strong, with the premaxillaries and maxillaries fused into a single piece. The jaws are equipped with a single row of small, rounded, close-set teeth; the vomerine teeth are absent. The eyes are small and round; the anterior pair of nostrils are short tubes and the posterior pair are slit-like. The gill openings are small and located below the pectoral fins, which are small and triangular. The dorsal, caudal, and anal fins are merged, the dorsal fin base originating over the tip of the pectoral fins and the anal fin originating behind the vent. The scales are similar in appearance to those of Anguilla and are arranged in a right-angle basketweave pattern. The coloration is gray to grayish brown, becoming darker at the fin margins and along the lateral line. This species attains a length of 61 cm (24 in).

== Biology and ecology ==
Early juvenile snubnosed eels feed on epibenthic copepods (Tharybis spp.) and amphipods. Adults appear to be specialized hagfish-like scavengers, using their powerfully muscled jaws and short, stout teeth to tear away chunks of flesh from carcasses that have fallen to the sea floor. However, this eel is more notorious for its parasitic habits, which are often repeated in literature. Frank Thomas Bullen, in the 1904 Denizens of the Deep, wrote that the eel "attaches himself to the bodies of the larger, fleshier fish, such as halibut, and by sheer force of suction and boring withal works his ravenous way right into their bodies, at what misery to his involuntary hosts can only be imagined." Spencer Fullerton Baird reported that the eels are "not unfrequently found nestling along the backbone of the halibut and cod, where they seem to have the power of abiding for some time without actually causing death." Baird also made note of the eels' supposed habit of burrowing into the abdominal cavities of netted, gravid shad and eating their eggs within the span of "a few minutes".

In 1992, two snubnose eels were discovered inside the heart of a 395 kg (871 lb) shortfin mako shark (Isurus oxyrhinchus) landed at Montauk, New York. The two eels, both immature females, measured 21 and 24 cm (8.3 and 9.4 in) long and had fed on blood, with histiological evidence suggesting that they had been there long enough for arteriosclerosis and hyperplasia (indicative of circulatory obstruction or toxicity from metabolic wastes), and tissue regeneration to occur. The authors speculated that the eels had burrowed into the shark through the gills or throat (the precise path of entry could not be determined, possibly obscured by damage caused by the tow rope) after it had been weakened on the capture line, entered the circulatory system, and then made their way to the heart. Despite records of its parasitic behavior, submersible encounters with free-swimming juveniles and adults, and their capture in baited traps, suggest that this species is at most a facultative parasite that opportunistically enters sick and dying fish.

Reproduction is oviparous. The eggs are likely pelagic, measuring at least 2 mm (0.079 in) across, and lack an oil globule. An ovary from one 51 cm (20 in) female examined contained about 30,000 eggs. Like all other eels, the snubnosed eel undergoes a leptocephalus larval stage that metamorphoses into a juvenile form resembling the adult. Leptocephali belonging to this species have yet to be identified, but based on the appearance of the metamorphic stage, they likely have long bodies with short heads and small mouths, and little to no body pigmentation. Metamorphic fish are white, with the black peritoneum clearly visible; one known metamorphic specimen measured 11 cm (4.3 in) long. Sexual maturation is attained at around a length of 50–53 cm (20–21 in). The trematode Hypertrema ambovatum is a known parasite of this species, infesting the intestines.

== Research ==
In 2002, Koyama et al. reported that they had cultured cells from the pectoral fin of a snubnosed eel and maintained them in vitro for over a year. This represents one of the first cases of successful long-term tissue culture derived from a deep-sea multicellular organism, and has implications for a range of biotechnological fields.
