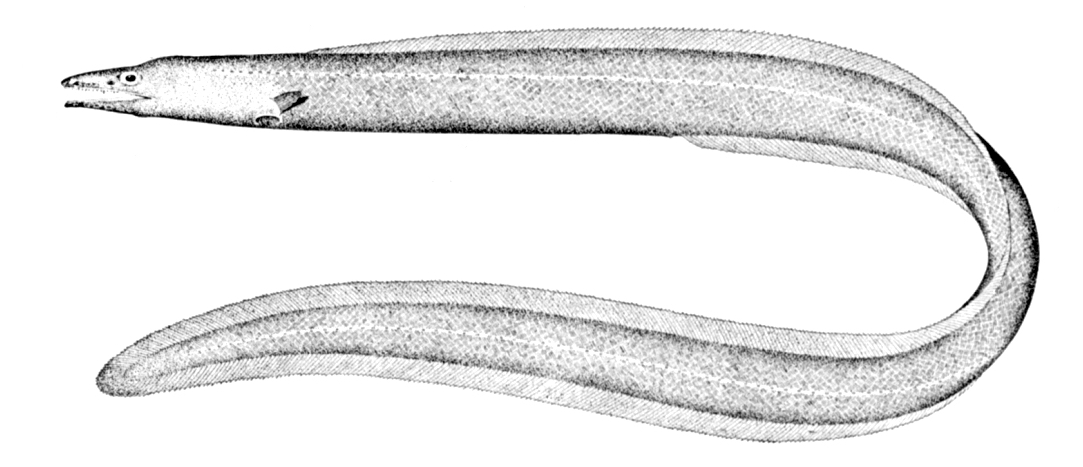
- From plate 43 of Oceanic Ichthyology by G. Brown Goode and Tarleton H. Bean, published 1896.

Scientific classification
- Domain: Eukaryota
- Kingdom: Animalia
- Phylum: Chordata
- Class: Actinopterygii
- Order: Anguilliformes
- Family: Synaphobranchidae
- Genus: Ilyophis
- Species: I. brunneus

Binomial name
- Ilyophis brunneus C. H. Gilbert, 1891

= Muddy arrowtooth eel =

Species of fish

The muddy arrowtooth eel, Ilyophis brunneus, is a cutthroat eel in the family Synaphobranchidae. It is found around the world at depths below 1,000 m. Its length is up to 160 cm.
