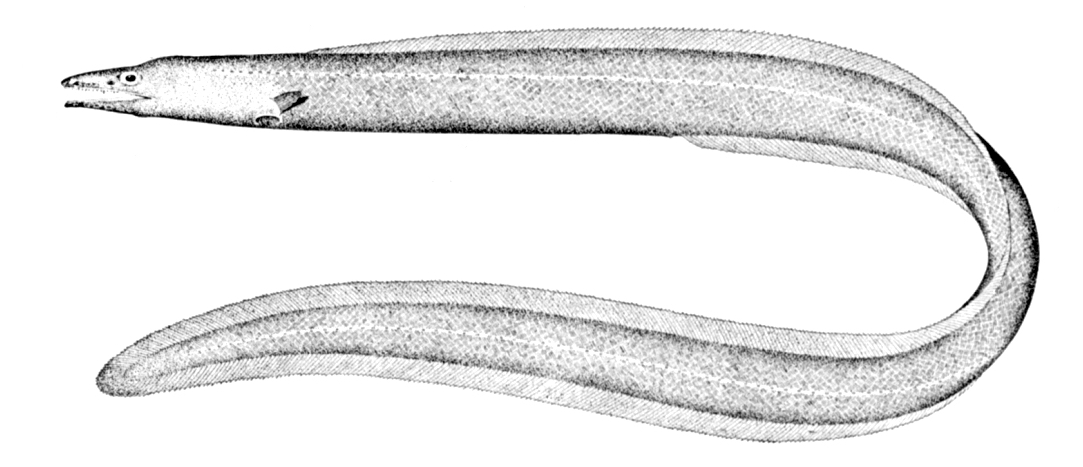
- Muddy arrowtooth eel, Ilyophis brunneus. From plate 43 of Oceanic Ichthyology by George Brown Goode and Tarleton Hoffman Bean, published 1896.

Scientific classification
- Domain: Eukaryota
- Kingdom: Animalia
- Phylum: Chordata
- Class: Actinopterygii
- Order: Anguilliformes
- Suborder: Synaphobranchoidei; Bleeker, 1864
- Family: Synaphobranchidae; J. Y. Johnson, 1862

Genera
- see text

= Cutthroat eel =

Cutthroat eels

Family of fishes

Cutthroat eels are a family, Synaphobranchidae, of eels, the only members of the suborder Synaphobranchoidei. They are found worldwide in temperate and tropical seas.

Cutthroat eels range from 23 to 160 cm (9.1 to 63.0 in) in length. They are bottom-dwelling fish, found in deep waters down to about 3,700 m (12,100 ft). They are distinguished by the presence of telescopic eyes in the larvae. In some classifications (for example, ITIS), this family is split, with Simenchelys in its own family, the Simenchelyidae.

== Subfamilies and genera ==
Cutthroat eels are classified into the following subfamilies and genera:

- Subfamily Simenchelyinae Gill, 1879 (pugnose parasitic eels)
  - Simenchelys Gill, 1879
- Subfamily Ilyophinae D. S. Jordan & Davis, 1891 (arrowtooth eels or mustard eels)
  - Atractodenchelys C.H. Robins & C. R. Robins, 1970
  - Dysomma Alcock, 1889
  - Dysommina Ginsburg, 1951
  - Ilyophis Gilbert, 1891
  - Linkenchelys D. G. Smith, 1989
  - Meadia Böhlke, 1951
  - Thermobiotes Geistdoerfer, 1991
- Subfamily Synaphobranchinae J. Y. Johnson, 1862 (cutthroat eels)
  - Diastobranchus Barnard, 1923
  - Haptenchelys C. H. Robins & D. M. Martin, 1976
  - Histiobranchus Gill, 1883
  - Synaphobranchus J. Y. Johnson, 1862
