= List of fish by common name =

List of common names used to refer to fish

Common names of fish can refer to a single species; to an entire group of species, such as a genus or family; or to multiple unrelated species or groups. Ambiguous common names are accompanied by their possible meanings. Scientific names for individual species and higher taxa are included in parentheses.

== A ==
- African glass catfish (Pareutropius debauwi)
- African lungfish (genus Protopterus)
- Aholehole (genus Kuhlia and family Kuhliidae)
- Airbreathing catfish (family Clariidae)
- Airsac catfish (genus Heteropneustes)
- Alaska blackfish
- Albacore
- Alewife
- Alfonsino
- Algae eater (numerous species that are not necessarily closely related)
- Alligatorfish (family Agonidae)
- Alligator gar
- Amberjack (genus Seriola)
- American sole (family Achiridae)
- Amur pike
- Anchovy (family Engraulidae)
- Anemonefish (subfamily Amphiprioninae of family Pomacentridae)
- Angelfish (numerous unrelated taxa, including family Pomacanthidae, family Squatinidae, genus Pterophyllum, the Atlantic pomfret, the Atlantic spadefish, and the cave angelfish)
- Angler (Lophius piscatorius)
- Angler catfish (genus Chaca)
- Anglerfish (order Lophiiformes)
- Antarctic cod
- Antarctic icefish (suborder Notothenioidei of order Perciformes)
- Antenna codlet (Bregmaceros atlanticus)
- Arapaima (genus Arapaima)
- Archerfish (genus Toxotes and family Toxotidae)
- Arctic char
- Armored gurnard (family Peristediidae)
- Armored searobin (family Peristediidae)
- Armorhead (family Pentacerotidae)
- Armorhead catfish (genus Cranoglanis)
- Armoured catfish
- Arowana (family Osteoglossidae)
- Arrowtooth eel (several species, including Dysomma anguillare, Dysomma brevirostre, Histiobranchus bathybius, Synaphobranchus kaupii, and Ilyophis brunneus)
- Asian carp
- Asiatic glassfish (family Ambassidae)
- Atka mackerel
- Atlantic bonito
- Atlantic cod
- Atlantic herring
- Atlantic salmon
- Atlantic saury
- Atlantic sharpnose shark
- Atlantic silverside
- Australasian salmon (genus Arripis and family Arripidae)
- Australian grayling
- Australian herring
- Australian lungfish
- Australian prowfish (family Pataecidae)
- Ayu (Plecoglossus altivelis)

== B ==
- Baikal oilfish
- Bala shark
- Ballan wrasse
- Bamboo shark
- Banded killifish
- Bandfish
- Bangus
- Banjo
- Banjo catfish
- Barb
- Barbel
- Barbeled dragonfish
- Barbeled houndshark
- Barbel-less catfish
- Barfish
- Barracuda
- Barracudina
- Barramundi
- Barred danio
- Barreleye
- Basking shark
- Bass
- Basslet
- Bat ray
- Batfish
- Beachsalmon
- Beaked salmon
- Beaked sandfish
- Beardfish
- Beluga sturgeon
- Bengal danio
- Betta
- Bichir
- Bicolor goat fish
- Bigeye
- Bigeye squaretail
- Bighead carp
- Bigmouth buffalo
- Bigscale
- Bigscale pomfret
- Billfish
- Bitterling
- Black angelfish
- Black bass
- Black dragonfish
- Black mackerel
- Black neon tetra
- Black scabbardfish
- Black scalyfin
- Black sea bass
- Black swallower
- Black tetra
- Black triggerfish
- Blackchin
- Blackfin tuna
- Blackfish
- Blacktip reef shark
- Bleak
- Blenny
- Blind goby
- Blind shark
- Blobfish
- Blowfish
- Blue catfish
- Blue danio
- Blue eye trevalla
- Blue shark
- Blue triggerfish
- Blue whiting
- Blue-redstripe danio
- Bluefin tuna
- Bluefish
- Bluegill
- Blue gourami
- Bluntnose knifefish
- Bluntnose minnow
- Boafish
- Boarfish
- Bobtail snipe eel
- Bocaccio
- Boga
- Bombay duck
- Bonefish
- Bonito
- Bonnethead shark
- Bonnetmouth
- Bonytail
- Bonytongue
- Bowfin
- Boxfish
- Bramble shark
- Bream
- Brill
- Bristlemouth
- Bristlenose catfish
- Broadband dogfish
- Bronze corydoras
- Brook lamprey
- Brook stickleback
- Brook trout
- Brotula
- Brown trout
- Buffalo fish
- Bull shark
- Bull trout
- Bullhead
- Bullhead shark
- Bumblebee goby
- Burbot
- Buri
- Burma danio
- Burrowing goby
- Butterfish
- Butterfly ray
- Butterflyfish

== C ==
- California flyingfish
- California halibut
- Canary rockfish
- Candiru
- Candlefish
- Capelin
- Cardinal tetra
- Cardinalfish
- Carp
- Carpetshark
- Carpsucker
- Cat shark
- Catalufa
- Catfish
- Catla
- Cavefish
- Celebes rainbowfish
- Central mudminnow
- Chain pickerel
- Channel bass
- Channel catfish
- Char
- Cherry salmon
- Chimaera
- Chinook salmon
- Cherubfish
- Chub
- Chubsucker
- Chum salmon
- Cichlid
- Cisco
- Climbing catfish
- Climbing gourami
- Climbing perch
- Clingfish
- Clown loach
- Clown triggerfish
- Clownfish
- Cobbler
- Cobia
- Cod
- Codlet
- Codling
- Coelacanth
- Coffinfish
- Coho salmon
- Coley
- Collared carpetshark
- Collared dogfish
- Colorado squawfish
- Combfish
- Combtail gourami
- Combtooth blenny
- Common carp
- Common tunny
- Conger eel
- Convict blenny
- Convict cichlid
- Cookiecutter shark
- Coolie loach
- Cornetfish
- Cow shark
- Cowfish
- Cownose ray
- Crappie
- Creek chub
- Crestfish
- Crevice kelpfish
- Croaker
- Crocodile icefish
- Crocodile shark
- Crucian carp
- Cuckoo wrasse
- Cusk
- Cusk-eel
- Cutlassfish
- Cutthroat eel
- Cutthroat trout

== D ==
- Dab
- Dace
- Daggertooth pike conger
- Damselfish
- Danio
- Dartfish
- Dealfish
- Death Valley pupfish
- Deep-sea eel
- Deep-sea smelt
- Deepwater cardinalfish
- Deepwater flathead
- Deepwater stingray
- Delta smelt
- Demoiselle
- Denticle herring
- Desert pupfish
- Devario
- Devil ray
- Dhufish
- Discus
- Dogfish
- Dogfish shark
- Dogteeth tetra
- Dojo loach
- Dolly Varden trout
- Dolphin fish
- Dorab wolf-herring
- Dorado
- Dory
- Dottyback
- Dragon goby
- Dragonet
- Dragonfish
- Driftfish
- Driftwood catfish
- Drum
- Duckbill
- Duckbill eel
- Dusky grouper
- Dusky shark
- Dwarf gourami
- Dwarf loach

== E ==
- Eagle ray
- Earthworm eel
- Eel
- Eel cod
- Eel-goby
- Eelpout
- Eeltail catfish
- Elasmobranch
- Electric catfish
- Electric eel
- Electric knifefish
- Electric ray
- Elephant fish
- Elephantnose fish
- Elver
- Ember parrotfish
- Emerald catfish
- Emperor
- Emperor angelfish
- Emperor bream
- Escolar
- Eucla cod
- Eulachon
- European chub
- European eel
- European flounder
- European minnow
- European perch

== F ==
- False brotula
- False cat shark
- False moray
- False trevally
- Fangtooth
- Fathead sculpin
- Featherback
- Fierasfer
- Filefish
- Finback cat shark
- Fingerfish
- Fire bar danio
- Fire goby
- Firefish
- Flabby whale fish
- Flagblenny
- Flagfin
- Flagfish
- Flagtail
- Flashlight fish
- Flatfish
- Flathead
- Flathead catfish
- Flier
- Flounder
- Flying fish
- Flying gurnard
- Footballfish
- Forehead brooder
- Four-eyed fish
- French angelfish
- Freshwater eel
- Freshwater hatchetfish
- Freshwater shark
- Frigate mackerel
- Frilled shark
- Frogfish
- Frogmouth catfish
- Fusilier fish

== G ==
- Galjoen fish
- Ganges shark
- Gar
- Garden eel
- Garibaldi
- Garpike
- Ghost fish
- Ghost flathead
- Ghost knifefish
- Ghost pipefish
- Ghost shark
- Ghoul
- Giant danio
- Giant gourami
- Giant sea bass
- Gibberfish
- Gila trout
- Gizzard shad
- Glass catfish
- Glass knifefish
- Glassfish
- Glowlight danio
- Goatfish
- Goblin shark
- Goby
- Golden dojo
- Golden loach
- Golden shiner
- Golden trout
- Goldeye
- Goldfish
- Gombessa
- Goosefish
- Gopher rockfish
- Gourami
- Grass carp
- Graveldiver
- Gray mullet
- Gray reef shark
- Grayling
- Great white shark
- Green spotted puffer
- Green swordtail
- Greeneye
- Greenling
- Grenadier
- Ground shark
- Grouper
- Grunion
- Grunt
- Grunt sculpin
- Grunter
- Gudgeon
- Guitarfish
- Gulf menhaden
- Gulper
- Gulper eel
- Gunnel
- Guppy
- Gurnard

== H ==
- Haddock
- Hagfish
- Hairtail
- Hake
- Halfbeak
- Halfmoon
- Halibut
- Halosaur
- Hamlet
- Hammerhead shark
- Hammerjaw
- Handfish
- Hardhead catfish
- Harelip sucker
- Hatchetfish
- Hawkfish
- Herring
- Herring smelt
- Hickory Shad
- Hillstream loach
- Hog sucker
- Hoki
- Horn shark
- Horsefish
- Houndshark
- Huchen
- Humuhumunukunukuapua'a
- Hussar

== I ==
- Icefish
- Ide
- Ilish/Hilsha
- Inanga
- Inconnu

== J ==
- Jack
- Jack Dempsey
- Jackfish
- Japanese eel
- Javelin
- Jawfish
- Jellynose fish
- Jewel tetra
- Jewelfish
- Jewfish
- John Dory

== K ==
- Kafue pike
- Kahawai
- Kaluga
- Kanyu
- Kelp perch
- Kelpfish
- Killifish
- King of the herrings
- King-of-the-salmon
- Kingfish
- Kissing gourami
- Knifefish
- Knifejaw
- Koi
- Kokanee
- Kokopu
- Kuhli loach

== L ==
- Labyrinth fish
- Ladyfish
- Lake chub
- Lake trout
- Lake whitefish
- Lampfish
- Lamprey
- Lancetfish
- Lanternfish
- Largemouth bass
- Leaffish
- Leatherjacket
- Lefteye flounder
- Lemon shark
- Lemon sole
- Lemon tetra
- Lenok
- Leopard danio
- Lightfish
- Limia
- Lined sole
- Ling
- Ling cod
- Lionfish
- Livebearer
- Lizardfish
- Loach
- Loach catfish
- Loach goby
- Loach minnow
- Longfin
- Longfin dragonfish
- Longfin escolar
- Longfin smelt
- Long-finned char
- Long-finned pike
- Long-finned sand diver
- Longjaw mudsucker
- Longneck eel
- Longnose chimaera
- Longnose dace
- Longnose lancetfish
- Longnose sucker
- Longnose whiptail catfish
- Long-whiskered catfish
- Loosejaw
- Lost River sucker
- Louvar
- Loweye catfish
- Luderick
- Luminous hake
- Lumpsucker
- Lungfish

== M ==
- Mackerel
- Mackerel shark
- Madtom
- Mahi-mahi
- Mahseer
- Mail-cheeked fish
- Mako shark
- Mandarinfish
- Manefish
- Man-of-war fish
- Manta ray
- Marblefish
- Marine hatchetfish
- Marlin
- Masu salmon
- Medaka
- Medusafish
- Megamouth shark
- Menhaden
- Merluccid hake
- Mexican golden trout
- Midshipman fish
- Milkfish
- Minnow
- Minnow of the deep
- Modoc sucker
- Mojarra
- Mola mola
- Monkeyface prickleback
- Monkfish
- Mooneye
- Moonfish
- Moorish idol
- Mora
- Moray eel
- Morid cod
- Morwong
- Moses sole
- Mosquitofish
- Mouthbrooder
- Mozambique tilapia
- Mrigal
- Mud catfish
- Mud minnow
- Mudfish
- Mudskipper
- Mudsucker
- Mullet
- Mummichog
- Murray cod
- Muskellunge
- Mustache triggerfish
- Mustard eel

== N ==
- Naked-back knifefish
- Nase
- Needlefish
- Neon tetra
- New World rivuline
- New Zealand sand diver
- New Zealand smelt
- Nibble fish
- Noodlefish
- North American darter
- North American freshwater catfish
- North Pacific daggertooth
- Northern anchovy
- Northern clingfish
- Northern lampfish
- Northern pike
- Northern sea robin
- Northern squawfish
- Northern stargazer
- Notothen
- Nurse shark
- Nurseryfish

== O ==
- Oarfish
- Ocean perch
- Ocean sunfish
- Oceanic whitetip shark
- Oilfish
- Old World knifefish
- Oldwife
- Olive flounder
- Opah
- Opaleye
- Orange roughy
- Orangespine unicorn fish
- Orangestriped triggerfish
- Orbicular batfish
- Orbicular velvetfish
- Oregon chub
- Orfe
- Oriental loach
- Oscar
- Owens pupfish

== P ==
- Pacific albacore
- Pacific cod
- Pacific hake
- Pacific herring
- Pacific lamprey
- Pacific rudderfish
- Pacific salmon
- Pacific saury
- Pacific trout
- Pacific viperfish
- Paddlefish
- Pancake batfish
- Panga
- Paradise fish
- Parasitic catfish
- Parore
- Parrotfish
- Peacock flounder
- Peamouth
- Pearl danio
- Pearl perch
- Pearleye
- Pearlfish
- Pelagic cod
- Pelican eel
- Pelican gulper
- Pencil catfish
- Pencilfish
- Pencilsmelt
- Peppered corydoras
- Perch
- Peters' elephantnose fish
- Pickerel
- Pigfish
- Pike
- Pike conger
- Pike eel
- Pikeblenny
- Pikeperch
- Pilchard
- Pilot fish
- Pineapplefish
- Pineconefish
- Pink salmon
- Píntano
- Pipefish
- Piranha
- Pirarucu
- Pirate perch
- Plaice
- Platy
- Platyfish
- Pleco
- Plownose chimaera
- Poacher
- Pollock
- Pollyfish
- Pomfret
- Pompano
- Pompano dolphinfish
- Ponyfish
- Popeye catalufa
- Porbeagle shark
- Porcupinefish
- Porgy
- Port Jackson shark
- Powen
- Prickleback
- Pricklefish
- Prickly shark
- Prowfish
- Pufferfish
- Pumpkinseed
- Pupfish
- Pygmy sunfish

== Q ==
- Queen danio
- Queen parrotfish
- Queen triggerfish
- Quillback
- Quillfish

== R ==
- Rabbitfish
- Raccoon butterfly fish
- Ragfish
- Rainbow trout
- Rainbowfish
- Rasbora
- Ratfish
- Rattail
- Ray
- Razorback sucker
- Razorfish
- Red grouper
- Red salmon
- Red snapper
- Redfin perch
- Redfish
- Redhorse sucker
- Redlip blenny
- Redmouth whalefish
- Redtooth triggerfish
- Red velvetfish
- Red whalefish
- Reedfish
- Reef triggerfish
- Remora
- Requiem shark
- Ribbon eel
- Ribbon sawtail fish
- Ribbonfish
- Rice eel
- Ricefish
- Ridgehead
- Riffle dace
- Righteye flounder
- Rio Grande perch
- River loach
- River shark
- River stingray
- Rivuline
- Roach
- Roanoke bass
- Rock bass
- Rock beauty
- Rock cod
- Rock gunnel
- Rocket danio
- Rockfish
- Rockling
- Rockweed gunnel
- Rohu
- Ronquil
- Roosterfish
- Ropefish
- Rough scad
- Rough sculpin
- Roughy
- Roundhead
- Round herring
- Round stingray
- Round whitefish
- Rudd
- Rudderfish
- Ruffe
- Russian sturgeon

== S ==
- Sábalo
- Sabertooth
- Saber-toothed blenny
- Sabertooth fish
- Sablefish
- Stromateidae
- Sacramento blackfish
- Sacramento splittail
- Sailfin silverside
- Sailfish
- Salamanderfish
- Salmon
- Salmon shark
- Sandbar shark
- Sandburrower
- Sand dab
- Sand diver
- Sand eel
- Sandfish
- Sand goby
- Sand knifefish
- Sand lance
- Sandperch
- Sandroller
- Sand stargazer
- Sand tiger
- Sand tilefish
- Sandbar shark
- Sarcastic fringehead
- Sardine
- Sargassum fish
- Sauger
- Saury
- Saw shark
- Sawfish
- Sawtooth eel
- Scabbard fish
- Scaly dragonfish
- Scat
- Scissortail rasbora
- Scorpionfish
- Sculpin
- Scup
- Sea bass
- Sea bream
- Sea catfish
- Sea chub
- Sea devil
- Sea dragon
- Sea lamprey
- Sea raven
- Sea snail
- Sea toad
- Seahorse
- Seamoth
- Searobin
- Sergeant major
- Sevan trout
- Shad
- Shark
- Sharksucker
- Sharpnose puffer
- Sheatfish
- Sheepshead
- Sheepshead minnow
- Shiner
- Shortnose chimaera
- Shortnose sucker
- Shovelnose sturgeon
- Shrimpfish
- Siamese fighting fish
- Sillago
- Silver carp
- Silver dollar
- Silver dory
- Silver hake
- Silverside
- Silvertip tetra
- Sind danio
- Sixgill ray
- Sixgill shark
- Skate
- Skilfish
- Skipjack tuna
- Slender mola
- Slender snipe eel
- Sleeper
- Sleeper shark
- Slickhead
- Slimehead
- Slimy mackerel
- Slimy sculpin
- Slipmouth
- Smalleye squaretail
- Smalltooth sawfish
- Smelt
- Smelt-whiting
- Smooth dogfish
- Snailfish
- Snake eel
- Snake mackerel
- Snakehead
- Snapper
- Snipe eel
- Snipefish
- Snook
- Snubnose eel
- Snubnose parasitic eel
- Sockeye salmon
- Soldierfish
- Sole
- South American darter
- South American lungfish
- Southern Dolly Varden
- Southern flounder
- Southern hake
- Southern sandfish
- Southern smelt
- Spadefish
- Spaghetti eel
- Spanish mackerel
- Spearfish
- Speckled trout
- Spiderfish
- Spikefish
- Spinefoot
- Spiny basslet
- Spiny dogfish
- Spiny dwarf catfish
- Spiny eel
- Spinyfin
- Splitfin
- Spookfish
- Spotted climbing perch
- Spotted danio
- Spottail pinfish
- Sprat
- Springfish
- Squarehead catfish
- Squaretail
- Squawfish (disambiguation)
- Squeaker
- Squirrelfish
- Staghorn sculpin
- Stargazer
- Starry flounder
- Steelhead
- Stickleback
- Stingfish
- Stingray
- Stonecat
- Stonefish
- Stoneroller minnow
- Stream catfish
- Striped bass
- Striped burrfish
- Sturgeon
- Sucker
- Suckermouth armored catfish
- Summer flounder
- Sundaland noodlefish
- Sunfish
- Surf sardine
- Surfperch
- Surgeonfish
- Swallower
- Swamp-eel
- Swampfish
- Sweeper
- Swordfish
- Swordtail

== T ==
- Tadpole cod
- Tadpole fish
- Tailor
- Taimen
- Tang
- Tapetail
- Tarpon
- Tarwhine
- Telescopefish
- Temperate bass
- Temperate ocean-bass
- Temperate perch
- Tench
- Tenpounder
- Tenuis
- Tetra
- Thorny catfish
- Thornfish
- Threadfin
- Threadfin bream
- Thread-tail
- Three spot gourami
- Threespine stickleback
- Three-toothed puffer
- Thresher shark
- Tidewater goby
- Tiger barb
- Tigerfish
- Tigerperch
- Tiger shark
- Tiger shovelnose catfish
- Tilapia
- Tilefish
- Titan triggerfish
- Toadfish
- Tommy ruff
- Tompot blenny
- Tonguefish
- Tope
- Topminnow
- Torpedo
- Torrent catfish
- Torrent fish
- Trahira
- Treefish
- Trevally
- Triggerfish
- Triplefin blenny
- Triplespine
- Tripletail
- Tripod fish
- Trout
- Trout cod
- Trout-perch
- Trumpeter
- Trumpetfish
- Trunkfish
- Tubeblenny
- Tube-eye
- Tube-snout
- Tubeshoulder
- Tui chub
- Tuna
- Turbot
- Two spotted goby

== U ==
- Uaru
- Unicorn fish
- Upside-down catfish

== V ==
- Vanjaram
- Velvet belly lanternshark
- Velvet catfish
- Velvetfish
- Vendace
- Vermilion snapper
- Vimba
- Viperfish

== W ==
- Wahoo
- Walking catfish
- Wallago
- Walleye
- Walleye pollock
- Walu
- Warmouth
- Warty angler
- Waryfish
- Waspfish
- Weasel shark
- Weatherfish
- Weever
- Weeverfish
- Wels catfish
- Whale catfish
- Whalefish
- Whale shark
- Whiff
- Whitebait
- White croaker
- Whitefish
- White marlin
- White shark
- Whitetip reef shark
- Whiting
- Wobbegong
- Wolf-eel
- Wolffish
- Wolf-herring
- Worm eel
- Wormfish
- Wrasse
- Wrymouth

== X ==
- X-ray tetra

== Y ==
- Yellow-and-black triplefin
- Yellowback fusilier
- Yellowbanded perch
- Yellow bass
- Yellowedge grouper
- Yellow-edged moray
- Yellow-eye mullet
- Yellowhead jawfish
- Yellowfin croaker
- Yellowfin cutthroat trout
- Yellowfin grouper
- Yellowfin tuna
- Yellowfin pike
- Yellowfin surgeonfish
- Yellowfin tuna
- Yellow jack
- Yellowmargin triggerfish
- Yellow moray
- Yellow perch
- Yellowtail
- Yellowtail amberjack
- Yellowtail barracuda
- Yellowtail clownfish
- Yellowtail horse mackerel
- Yellowtail kingfish
- Yellowtail snapper
- Yellow tang
- Yellow weaver
- Yellowtail catfish

== Z ==
- Zander
- Zebra bullhead shark
- Zebra danio
- Zebrafish
- Zebra lionfish
- Zebra loach
- Zebra oto
- Zebra pleco
- Zebra shark
- Zebra tilapia
- Zebra turkeyfish
- Ziege
- Zingel

== See also ==
- List of aquarium fish by scientific name
- List of freshwater aquarium fish species
- Diversity of fish
