= Pickerel =

Pickerel may refer to:

== Animals ==
- Esox, a genus of fish commonly known as the pickerels
  - American pickerel
  - Chain pickerel
  - Redfin pickerel
- Walleye, a fish unrelated to Esox, is called pickerel in parts of Canada
- Pickerel frog

== Plants ==
- Pickerel weed or pickerelweed, any of several species of Pontederia

== Places ==
- Pickerel Creek, Missouri
- Pickerel River (disambiguation)
- Pickerel, Virginia
- Pickerel, Wisconsin

== People with the surname ==
- Mark Pickerel, American musician

== Other uses ==
- USS Pickerel, several ships of the United States Navy
