= Sand diver =

Sand diver may refer to:

Fish:

- Trichonotidae, a family of fishes of the suborder Trachinoidei
- long-finned sand diver, Limnichthys polyactis
- New Zealand sand diver, Tewara cranwellae
- Synodus intermedius (sand diver), a fish of the genus Synodus

Other uses:

- MV Sand Diver, formerly Empire Farrier, an Empire F type coaster
