= Louch (surname) =

Louch is a surname. Notable people with the surname include:

- George Louch (1746–1811), English cricket player
- Herb Louch (1875–1936), Australian rules footballer
- Lionel Louch (1888–1967), English amateur footballer

== See also ==
- Sheek Louch, stage name of American rapper Sean Divine Jacobs (born 1976)
- Loach (disambiguation), which includes people with the surname
