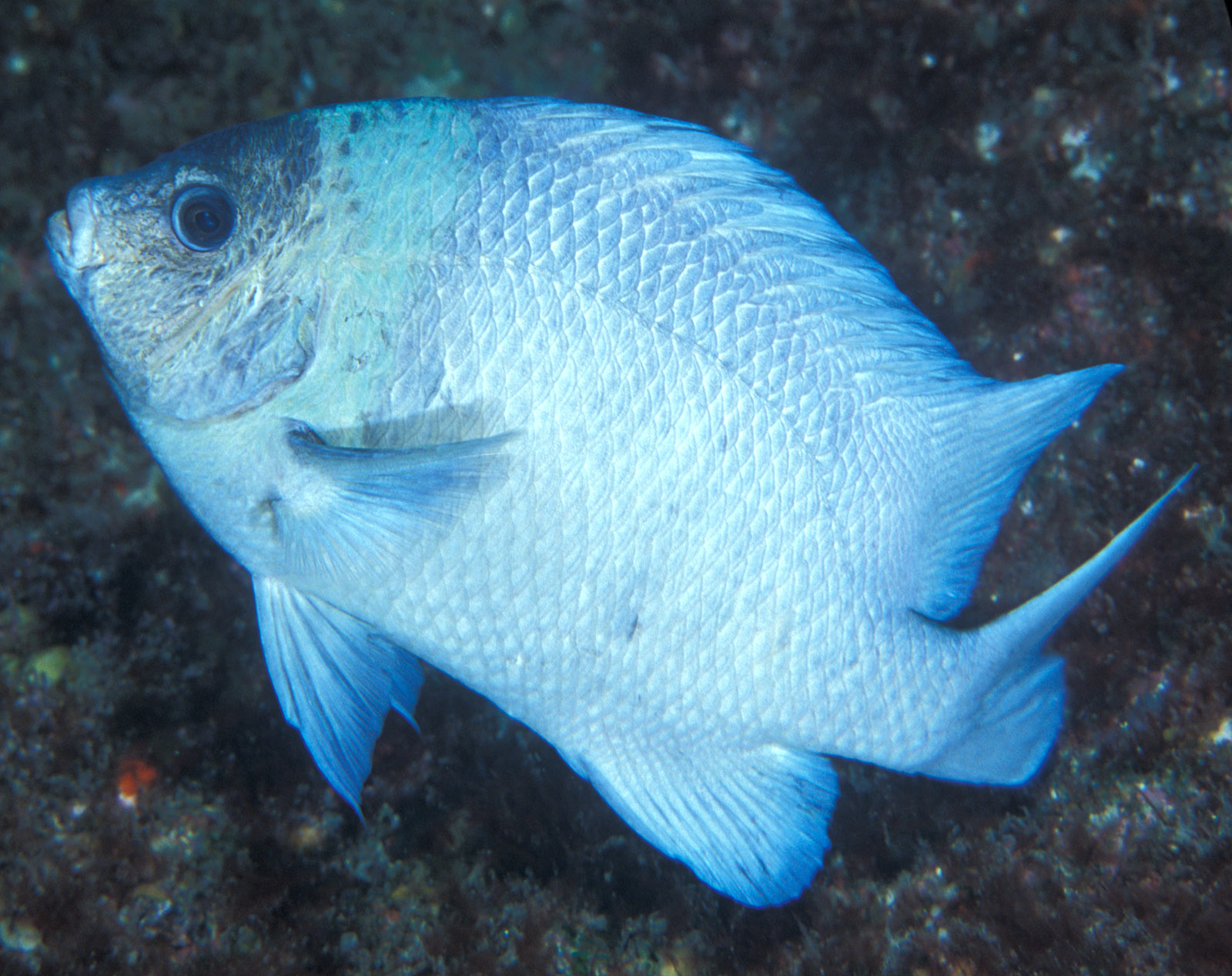

Scientific classification
- Kingdom: Animalia
- Phylum: Chordata
- Class: Actinopterygii
- Order: Blenniiformes
- Family: Pomacentridae
- Genus: Parma
- Species: P. kermadecensis

Binomial name
- Parma kermadecensis Allen, 1987

= Kermadec scalyfin =

Species of fish

The Kermadec scalyfin (Parma kermadecensis) is a damselfish of the genus Parma, found around New Zealand's Kermadec Islands around depths of between 3 and 20 m, over shallow rocky reef areas. Its maximum length recorded is 22 centimeters.
