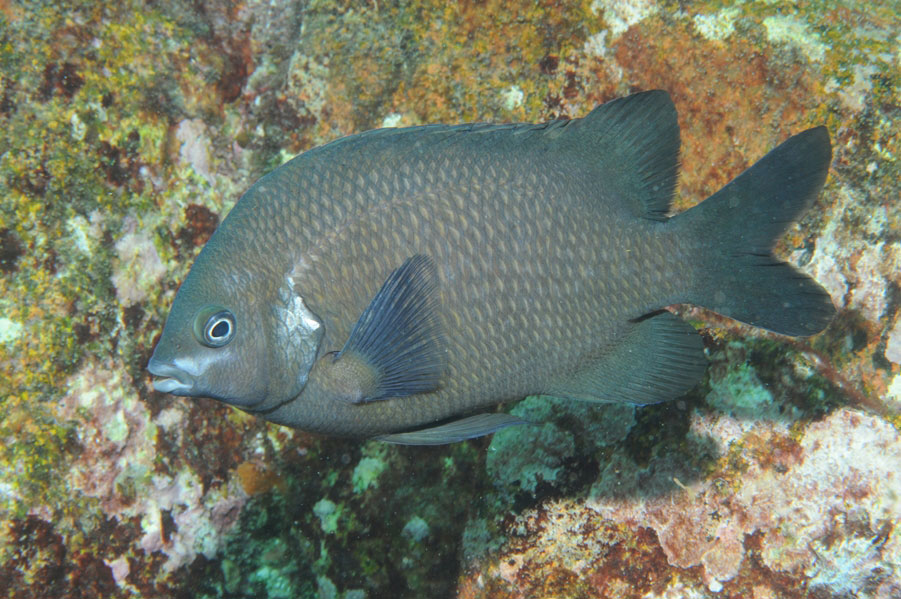
- White-ear scalyfin (Parma microlepis)

Scientific classification
- Kingdom: Animalia
- Phylum: Chordata
- Class: Actinopterygii
- Division: Teleostei
- Order: Blenniiformes
- Family: Pomacentridae
- Subfamily: Pomacentrinae
- Genus: Parma; Günther, 1862

Type species
- Parma microlepis Günther, 1862

= Parma (fish) =

Genus of fishes

Parma is a genus of damselfish in the family Pomacentridae.

== Species ==
Species	Common name	Image
Parma alboscapularis Allen & Hoese, 1975	New Zealand black angelfish	
Parma bicolor Allen & Larson, 1979	Bicolor scalyfin	
Parma kermadecensis Allen, 1987	Kermadec scalyfin	
Parma mccullochi Whitley, 1929	McCulloch's scalyfin	
Parma microlepis Günther, 1862	White-ear scalyfin	
Parma occidentalis Allen & Hoese, 1975	Western scalyfin	
Parma oligolepis Whitley, 1929	Big-scale parma	
Parma polylepis Günther, 1862	Banded parma	
Parma unifasciata (Steindachner, 1867)	Girdled scalyfin	
Parma victoriae (Günther, 1863)	Victorian scalyfin	
