= Burrowing goby =

Burrowing goby may refer to:

- Croilia mossambica, also known as the naked goby, a species of goby native to Mozambique and South Africa
- Trypauchen vagina, a species of goby found in the Indo-Pacific region
