= Black angelfish =

Black angelfish may refer to:

- Black angelfish, Chaetodontoplus niger
- New Zealand black angelfish, Parma alboscapularis
- Keyhole angelfish, Centropyge tibicen
- Freshwater angelfish, one of the breeds of Pterophyllum scalare
