= Blue triggerfish =

Blue triggerfish is a common name for several fishes and may refer to:

- Odonus niger
- Pseudobalistes fuscus
