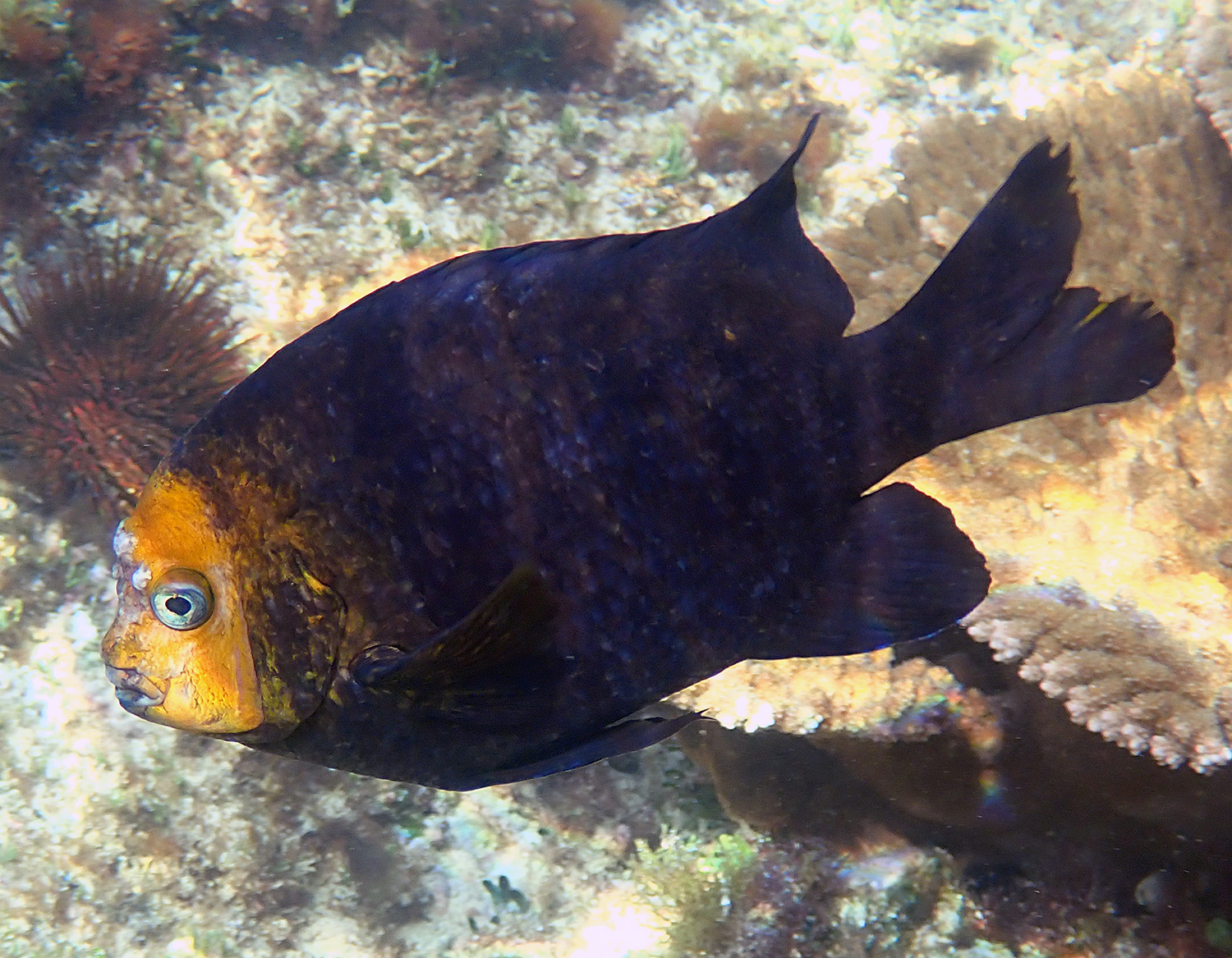
- At Norfolk Island

Scientific classification
- Kingdom: Animalia
- Phylum: Chordata
- Class: Actinopterygii
- Division: Teleostei
- Order: Blenniiformes
- Family: Pomacentridae
- Genus: Parma
- Species: P. polylepis

Binomial name
- Parma polylepis Günther, 1862

= Parma polylepis =

Species of fish

Parma polylepis, the banded parma, is a species of damselfish from the western-central Pacific Ocean.

== Distribution ==
The Banded parma can be found in marine waters off the coast of southeastern Australia, Lord Howe Island, Norfolk Island, New Caledonia, and northern New Zealand.

== Description ==
A large species of damselfish that can reach lengths of 21 cm, the banded parma can be distinguished by the prominent bony knobs above the eyes. Larger individuals have larger bony knobs.

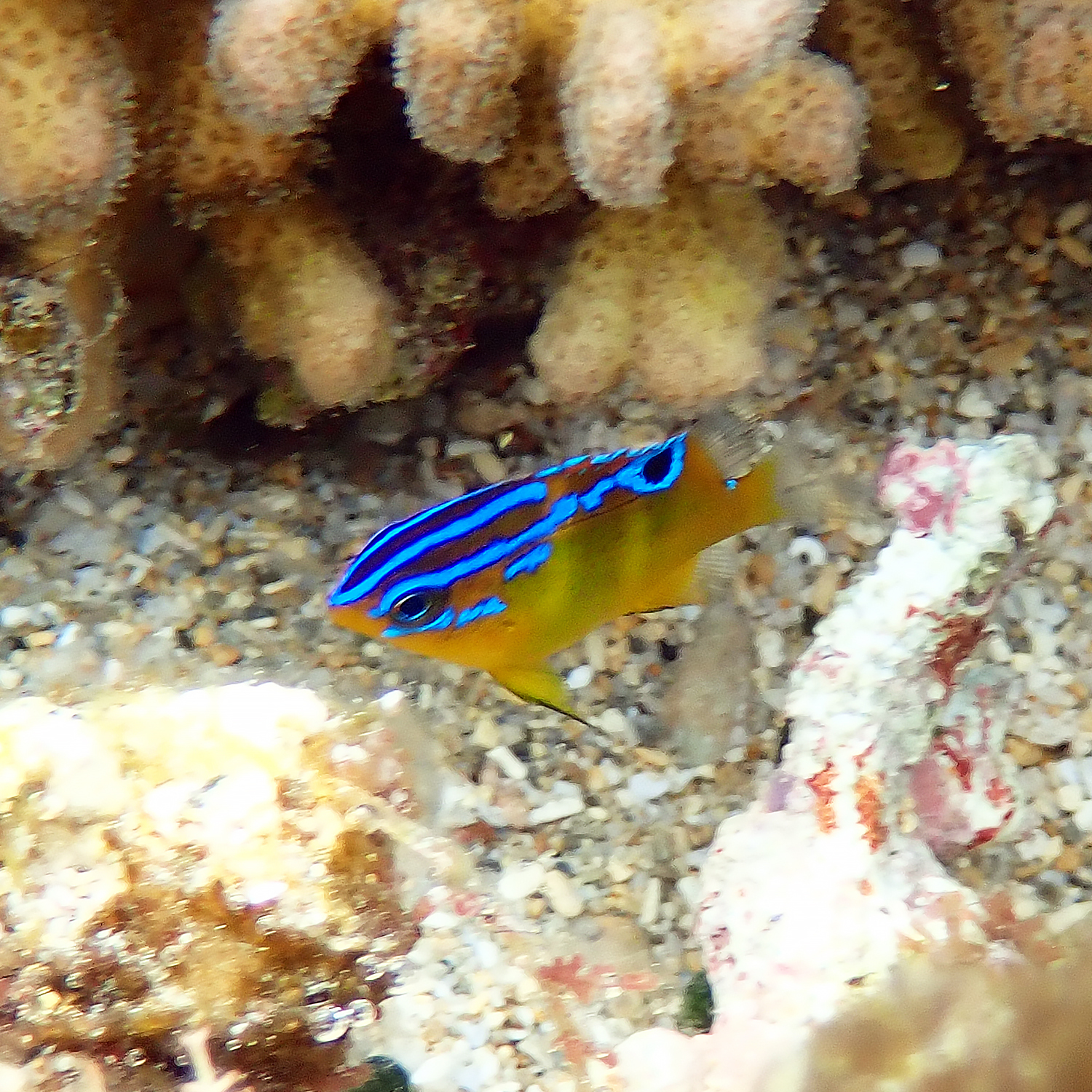
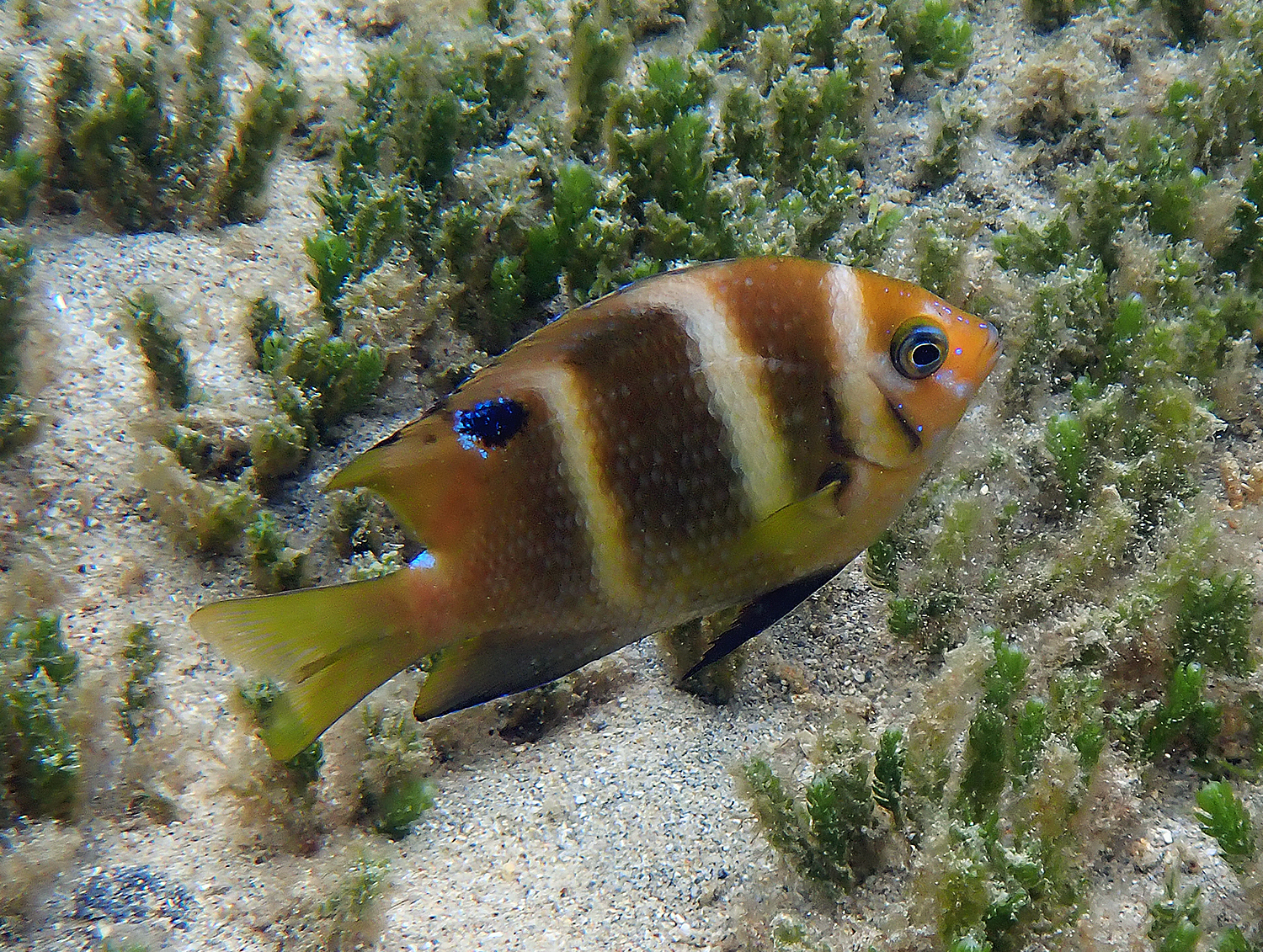
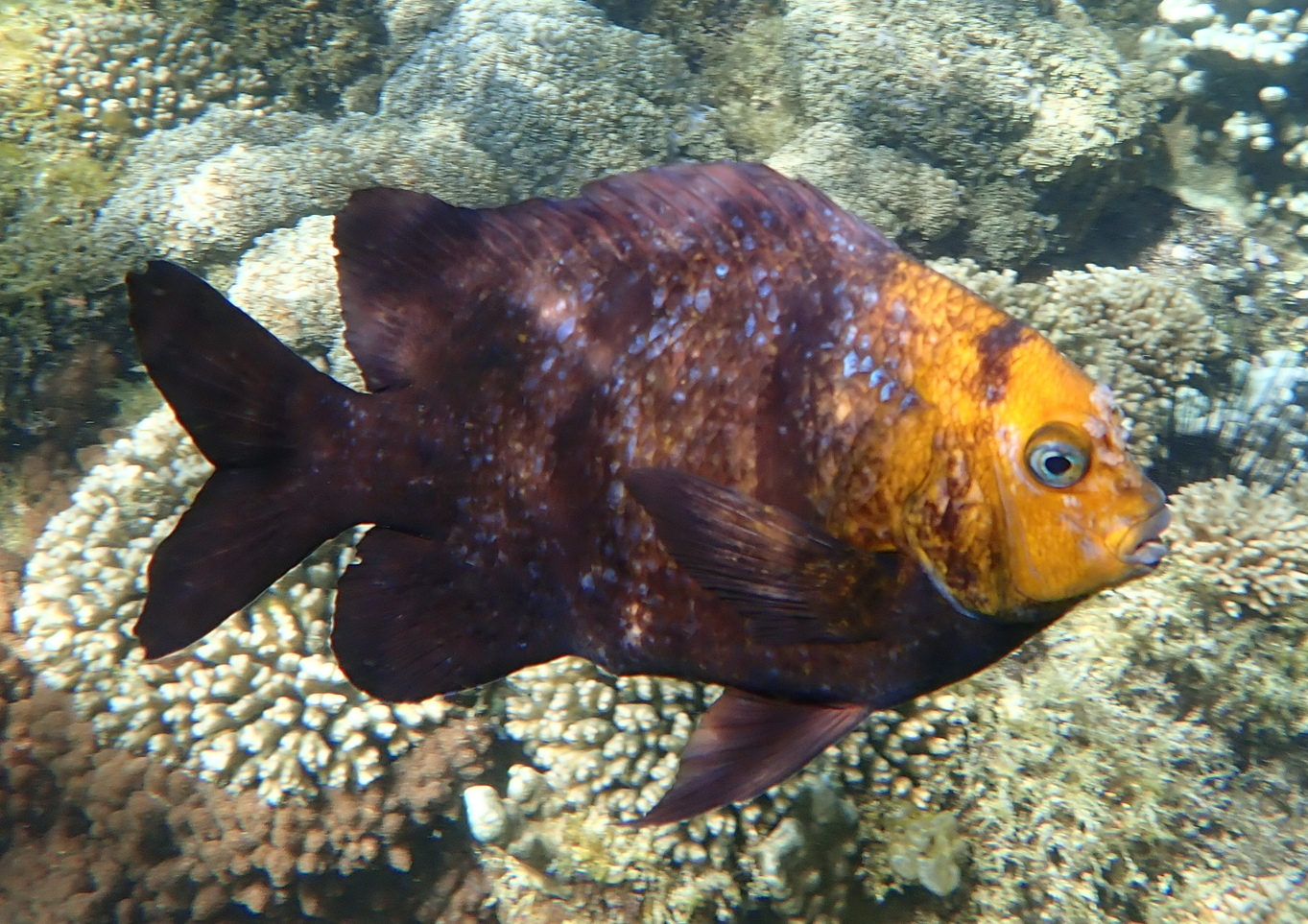
Growth series: from youngest juvenile to adult

== Gallery ==
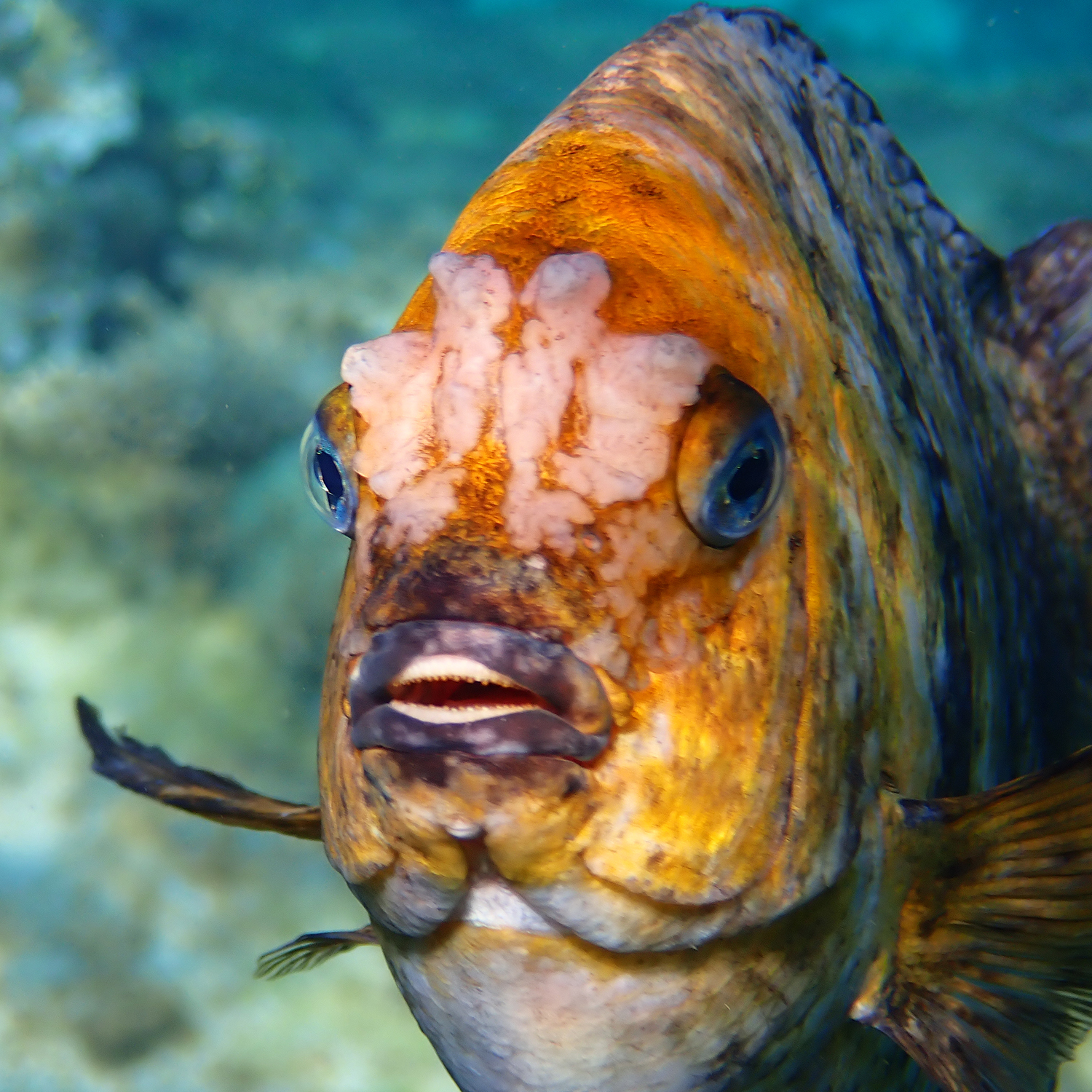
Showing bony knobs above the eyes

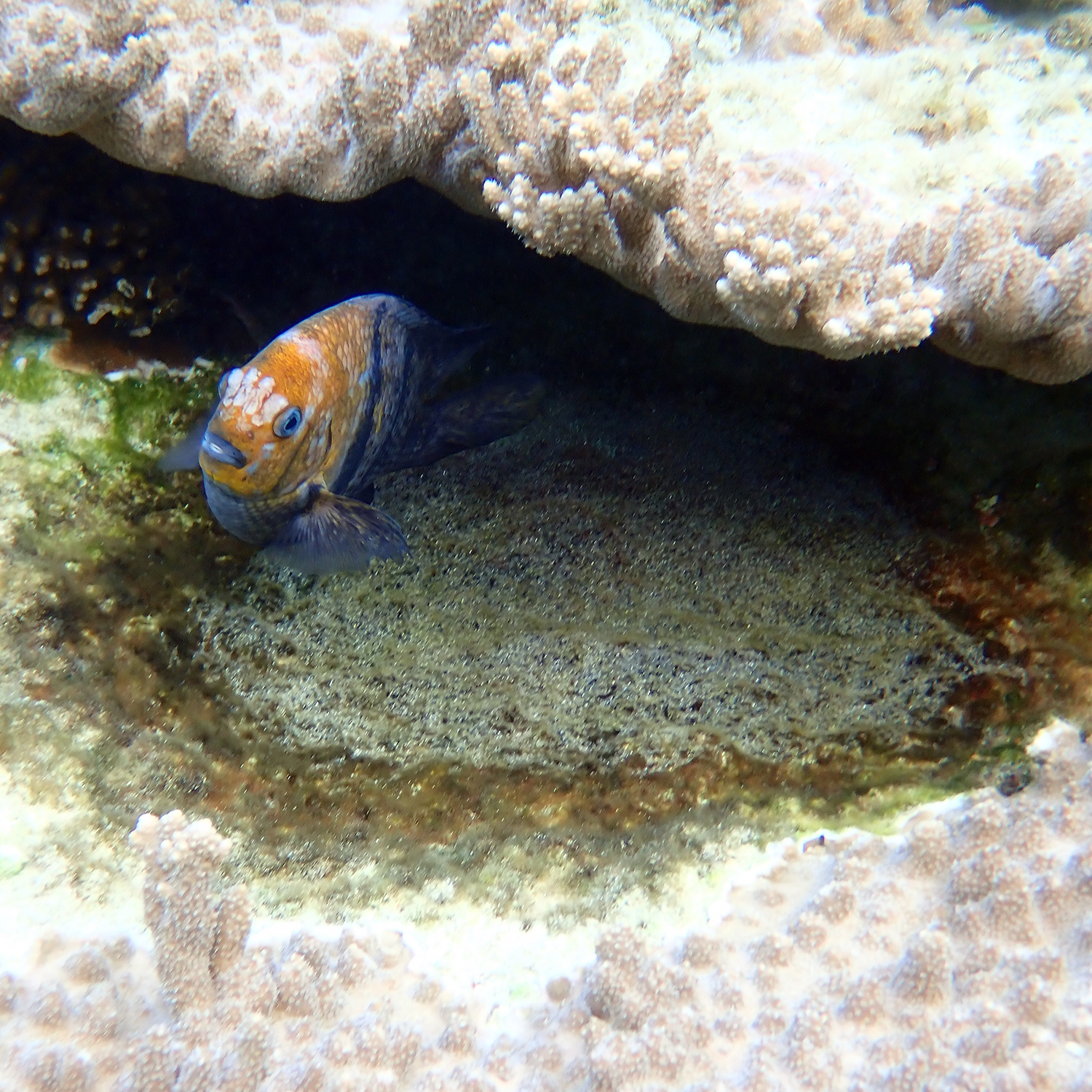
With eggs

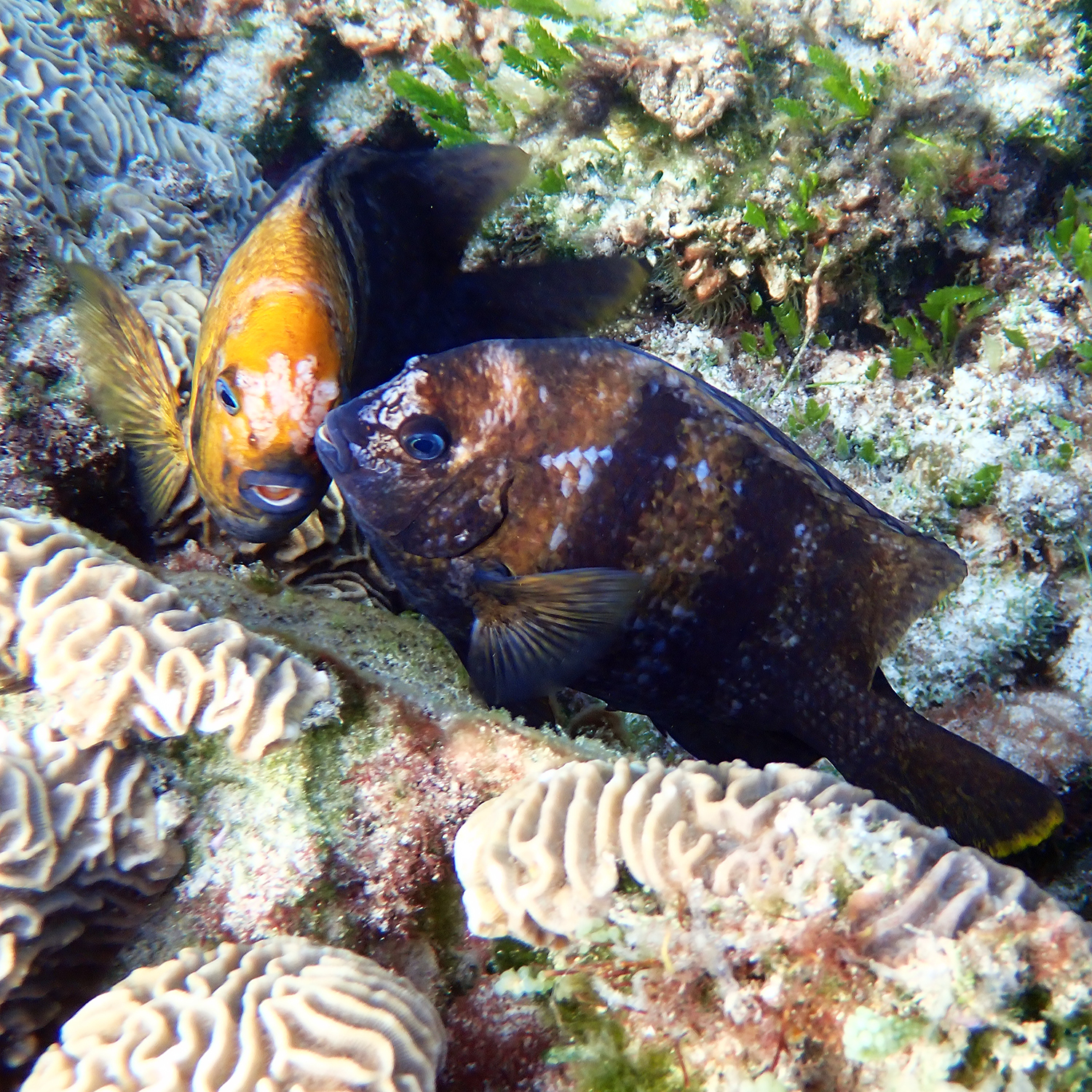
Pair over an egg nest

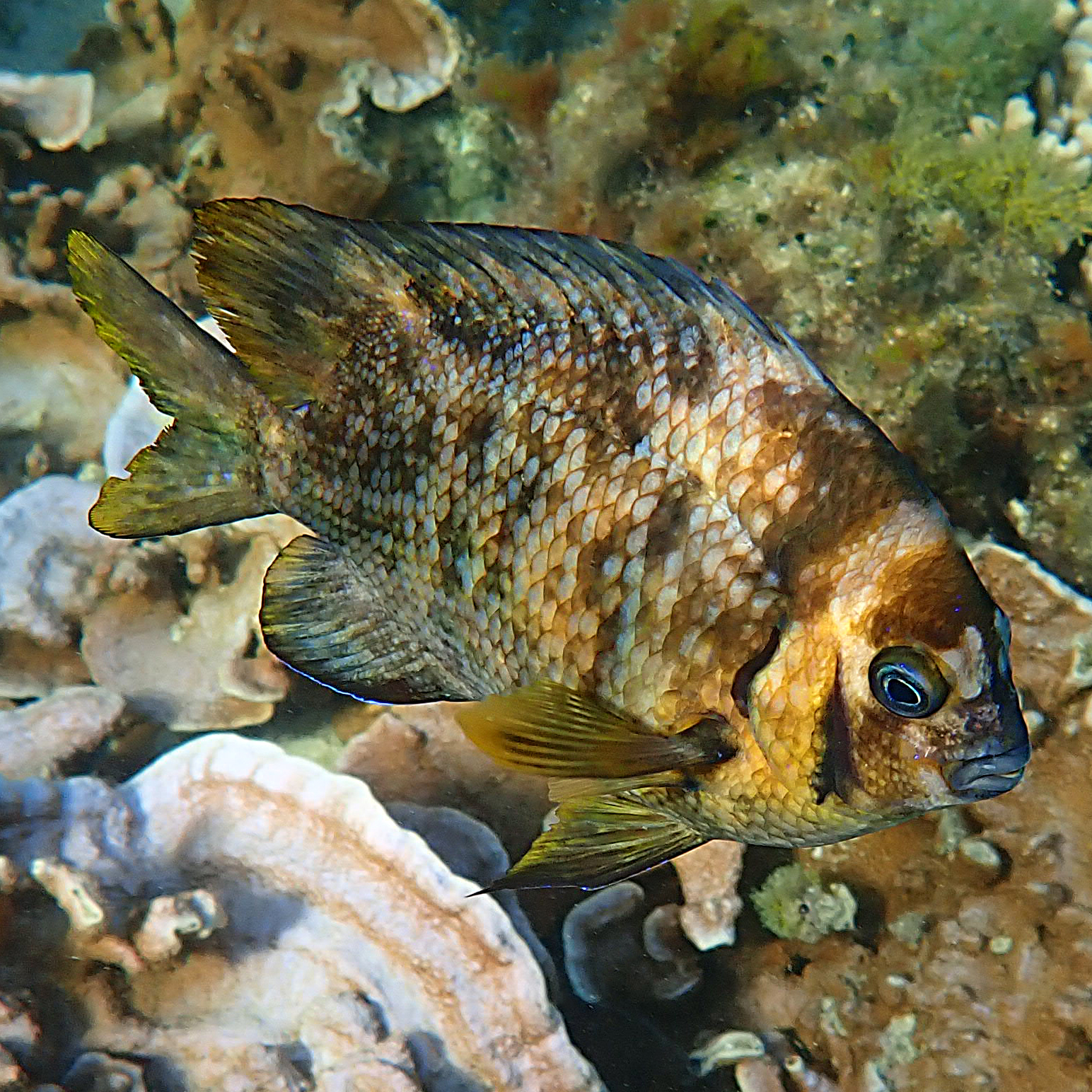

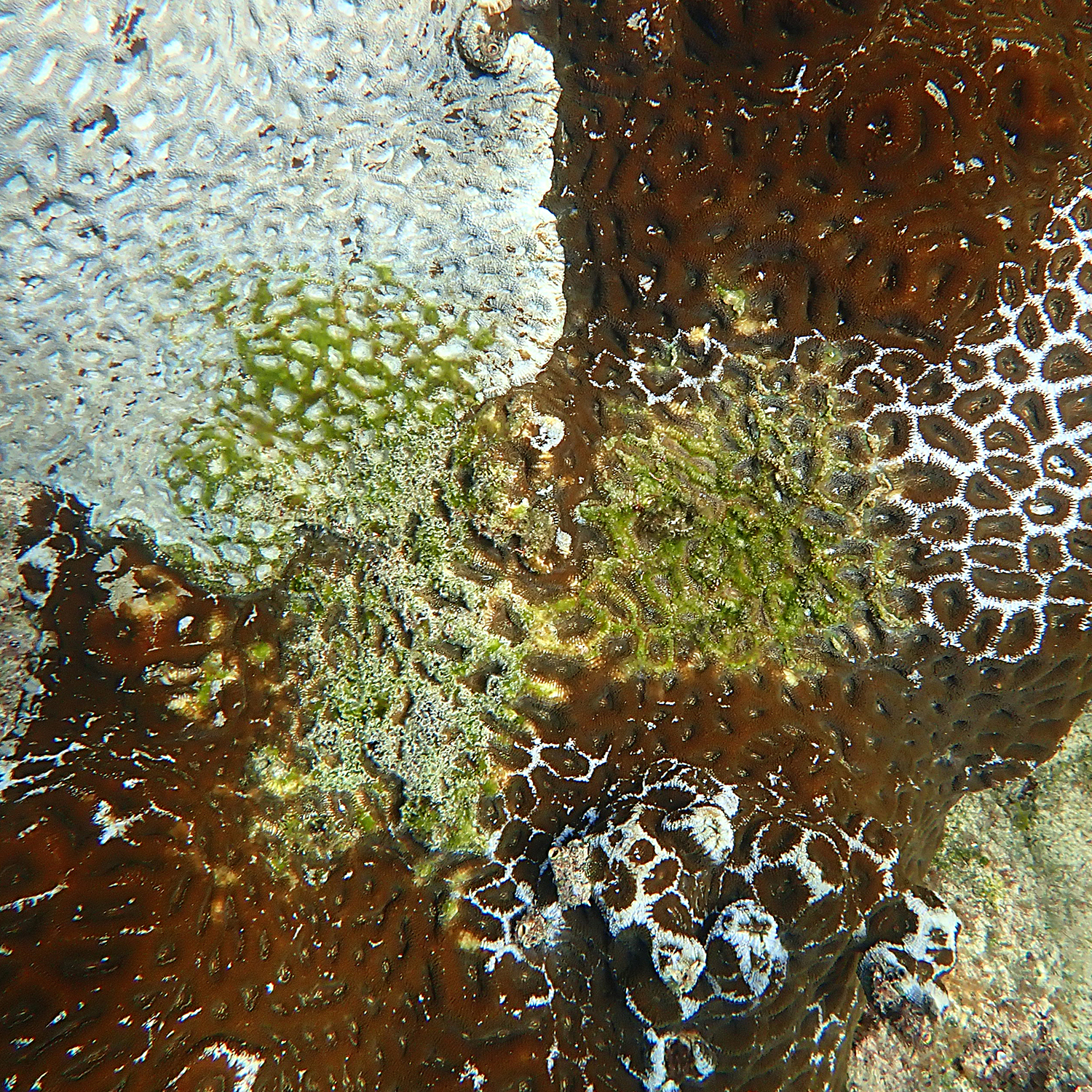
Algal patch cultivated by P. polylepis. Territorial damselfish are known to 'farm' algae.
