= Arrowtooth eel =

Arrowtooth eel may refer to several species of cutthroat eels:

- Shortbelly eel, Dysomma anguillare
- Deepwater arrowtooth eel, Histiobranchus bathybius
- Kaup's arrowtooth eel, Synaphobranchus kaupii
- Muddy arrowtooth eel, Ilyophis brunneus
- Pignosed arrowtooth eel, Dysomma brevirostre
