= Codling =

Codling ("little cod") may refer to:

- Little cod, particularly the Atlantic cod (Gadus morhua)
- Some morids, which resemble small cod
- Codling, a surname
- Codling moth
- Yakovlev Yak-40 (NATO reporting name: Codling), a three-engined jet airliner
