= Codling (surname) =

Codling is an English surname. Notable people with the surname include:

- Alex Codling (born 1973), English rugby union footballer
- Allan Codling (1911–1991), English footballer
- Danny Codling (born 1979), New Zealand boxer
- Monalisa Codling (born 1977), New Zealand rugby union player
- Neil Codling (born 1973), English musician and songwriter
- Rowland Codling (1880–1954), English footballer
