= Rockling =

Rockling is the vernacular name for a variety of fishes:

- Fish of the family Gaidropsaridae
- Australian rockling (Genypterus blacodes) from the family Ophidiidae
