= Glassfish =

Glassfish may refer to:

- Fishes in the family Ambassidae
- GlassFish, a Jakarta EE (formerly Java EE) application server project
