= Sheatfish =

Sheatfish may refer to the following catfish:

- Siluridae species
- The Wels (Silurus glanis)
- Micronema species
- Phalacronotus species
- Wallago species
