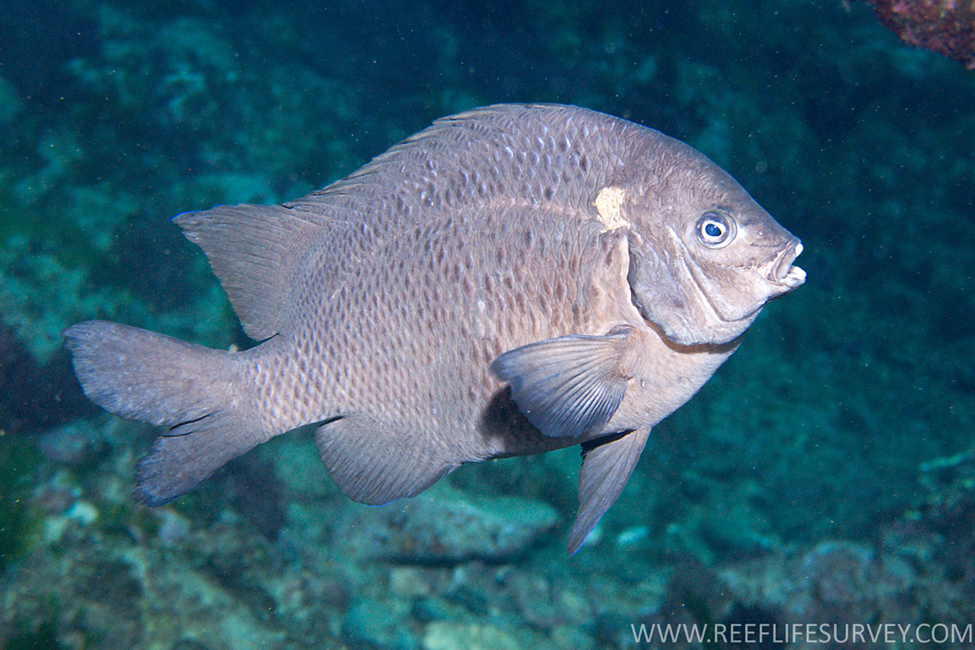

Scientific classification
- Kingdom: Animalia
- Phylum: Chordata
- Class: Actinopterygii
- Division: Teleostei
- Order: Blenniiformes
- Family: Pomacentridae
- Genus: Parma
- Species: P. alboscapularis

Binomial name
- Parma alboscapularis Allen & Hoese, 1975

= New Zealand black angelfish =

Species of fish

The New Zealand black angelfish or the black scalyfin, Parma alboscapularis, of the family Pomacentridae, is found around northeastern New Zealand.

== Description ==
Juvenile Parma alboscapularis are yellow with blue spots, while adults are dark blue or black. Its maximum Standard Length is 23 cm.

== Taxonomy ==
This species was originally described in 1975 by Gerald R. Allen and Douglass F. Hoese. Before that, it was identified as Parma microlepsis.

== Distribution ==
This species is found in the south west Pacific Ocean, including near Lord Howe Island, Norfolk Island, and the Kermadec Islands, and in New Zealand coastal waters. It is found to depths of 0 to 24 metres.
