= Croilia =

Conservation status
- Least Concern (IUCN 3.1)

Scientific classification
- Kingdom: Animalia
- Phylum: Chordata
- Class: Actinopterygii
- Order: Gobiiformes
- Family: Gobiidae
- Genus: Croilia
- Species: C. mossambica

Binomial name
- Croilia mossambica J. L. B. Smith, 1955

Species of fish

Croilia mossambica, the burrowing goby or naked goby, is a species of goby native fresh, brackish and marine waters of Mozambique, South Africa and Madagascar. This species can be found on fine-grained sandy substrates in still waters at depths of from 1 to 16 metres (3.3 to 52.5 ft). It can reach a length of 6 centimetres (2.4 in) TL. It is currently the only known member of its genus.
