= Tope =

listen

Tope may refer to:

== People ==
- Graham Tope, Baron Tope (born 1943), a Liberal Democrat politician in the UK
- Joanna Tope (1944–2024), English actress
- Mato-tope (1795–1837), Native American chief
- Tatya Tope, an Indian leader in the Indian Rebellion of 1857
- Tope Ademiluyi (born 1965), Nigerian politician
- Tope Alabi (born 1970), Nigerian gospel singer
- Tope Obadeyi (born 1989), footballer

== Other uses ==
- Tope (film), a 2017 Indian Bengali-language film
- Tope, an alternative term for stupa (a mound-like or hemispherical structure containing relics)
- Topé, a professional wrestling manoeuvre
- Tope shark or school shark, Galeorhinus galeus, a hound shark of the family Triakidae

== See also ==
- Taupe, a brown/grey colour
