= Brotula =

Brotula is a name for several fishes and may refer to:

- Bythitidae, a family of fishes also known as "viviparous brotulas"
- Ophidiidae, a family of fishes also known as "brotulas" or "cusk-eels"
  - Brotula (genus), a genus of fishes in the family Ophidiidae
