= Blackfish (disambiguation) =

Blackfish is a common name for several species of fish.

Blackfish or Black Fish may also refer to:

== Arts and entertainment ==
- Blackfish (comedy troupe), a Pakistani comedy troupe founded by Saad Haroon in 2002
- Blackfish (film), a 2013 documentary focusing on the orca Tilikum held by SeaWorld
- Blackfish Publishing, a British magazine publisher

== Other uses ==
- The Black Fish, the former name of FishAct, a marine conservation organization
- Blackfish, a common name for the short-finned pilot whale
- Blackfish (Shawnee leader) (c. 1729–1779), a native American leader
- Blackfish Lake Ferry Site, an historic site in Arkansas, United States
- Brynden Tully, a character in George R.R. Martin's A Song of Ice and Fire series
- USS Blackfish (SS-221), a United States Navy submarine, named for the blackfish, any one of several small, toothed whales

== See also ==
- Blakfish, an English math rock band that disbanded in 2010
- Blackfishing, white social media influencers who are perceived to be appropriating the look of Black women
