= Hatchetfish =

Hatchetfish may refer to three groups of fishes:

- Marine hatchetfishes, small deep-sea bioluminescent fishes (Stomiiformes) of the family Sternoptychidae, subfamily Sternoptychinae.
- Freshwater hatchetfishes, small South and Central American characins of the family Gasteropelecidae.
- Triportheus, the elongate hatchetfish, small South American freshwater characins of the family Triporthidae.
