= Climbing perch =

Climbing perch may refer to:

- Anabantidae, a family of fishes
  - Anabas testudineus, an Anabantidae native to Asia
  - Ctenopoma multispine, an Ananbantidae native to Africa
