= Ghostfish =

Ghostfish or Ghost Fish may refer to:

== Animals ==
=== Called "ghostfish" or "ghost fish" ===
- Predatory tunicate, which is not actually a fish
- Wrymouth
- Kryptopterus vitreolus

=== called similar names ===
- Chimaera, also known as a ghost shark
- Black ghost knifefish

== Other ==
- The 3rd episode of season 2 of My Goldfish Is Evil!
- The codename for watchOS 3.2.3
- Ghostfish: Catfished By a Ghost , a film from the 2016 48Hours competition

== Similar terms ==
- Ghost nets and other "ghost fishing gear"
- Ghost Fishing: An Eco-Justice Poetry Anthology
