= Bonnetmouth =

Bonnetmouth may refer to:

- Inermiidae, a fish family collectively known as 'bonnetmouths'
- Emmelichthyops atlanticus, an Atlantic Ocean fish commonly known as 'bonnetmouth'
- Emmelichthys nitidus, an Indian and Pacific Ocean fish commonly known as 'redbait' but is sometimes known as 'bonnetmouth'
