= Rockfish (disambiguation) =

Rockfish is a common type of fish, actually of many species.

Rockfish may also refer to:

== Geography ==
- Rockfish, North Carolina, United States, a census-designated place
- Rockfish Township, Cumberland County, North Carolina, a former township
- Rockfish Creek (Cape Fear River tributary), North Carolina
- Rockfish, Virginia, United States, an unincorporated community
- Rockfish River, Blue Ridge Mountains, Virginia
- Rockfish Gap, Blue Ridge Mountains, Virginia, a wind gap

== Other uses ==
- A nickname of Jim Rockford, the protagonist of the TV drama The Rockford Files
- Rockfish Games, a video game publisher; see, for example, Everspace

== See also ==
- Rock Phish, a type of computer malware
