= USS Pickerel =

Two ships of the United States Navy have borne the name USS Pickerel, named for the pickerel, a young or small pike.

- The first, USS Pickerel (SS-177), was a Porpoise-class submarine, launched in 1936 and lost in 1943 under unknown circumstances.
- The second, USS Pickerel (SS-524), was a Tench-class submarine, launched in 1944 and stricken in 1977.

A third ship, USS F-3 (SS-22), was originally laid down as USS Pickerel, but renamed prior to her 1912 launch.
