= Lampfish =

Lampfish is a common name for several fishes and may refer to:

- Dinoperca petersi
- Lampanyctus parvicauda
- Myctophum nitidulum

== See also ==
- Lanternfish
- Anglerfish
- Ceratoscopelus townsendi, dogtooth lampfish
