= Unicorn fish =

Unicorn fish may refer to:

- Naso (fish), a genus in family Acanthuridae
- Unicorn leatherjacket (Aluterus monoceros), family Monacanthidae
- Unicorn crestfish (Eumecichthys fiski), family Lophotidae
- Unicorn grenadier (Coelorinchus productus), family Macrouridae
