= Jewfish =

Jewfish may refer to:

== Fish ==
- Argyrosomus japonicus, traditionally known as the mulloway jewfish in eastern Australia
- Argyrosomus regius, commonly known as the meagre
- Epinephelus itajara, the Atlantic goliath grouper
- Glaucosoma hebraicum, officially known as the West Australian dhufish
- Stereolepis doederleini, the striped jewfish
- Tandanus tandanus, known as the eel-tailed catfish

== Places ==
- Jewfish, Florida, an unincorporated community in Monroe County, Florida, U.S.
- Jewfish Cay, also known as Hummingbird Cay, an island in the Bahamas
- Jewfish Point, a cape in California
