= Stingfish =

Stingfish is a common name for several fishes and may refer to:

- Several fishes in the subfamily Scorpaeninae
- Several fishes in the subfamily Synanceiinae
