= Silverside =

Silverside may refer to:

- Silverside (beef), a cut of beef
- Silverside (fish), the Atheriniformes, an order of fish
- Agnes Silverside (died 1557), one of the Colchester Martyrs
- USS Silversides, the name of two U.S. Navy submarines
- Silverside, nickname of early Greyhound Lines buses
- Silverside, Delaware, a place in the U.S.

== See also ==
- Silverback
