= Tube-snout =

Tube-snout is a common name for several fishes and may refer to:

- Aulorhynchus flavidus, the only species currently included in the family Aulorhynchidae
- Aulichthys japonicus, a species formerly included in the family Aulorhynchidae
