= Basslet =

Basslet is a common name for several fishes and may refer to:

- Grammatidae, a family with species known as basslets
- Howellidae, a family known as oceanic basslets
- Serranidae, a family with species known as basslets or fairy basslets
