= Leaf fish =

Leaf fish or Leaffish may refer to:

- Nandidae, Asian leaffishes
- Polycentridae, African & South American leaffishes
- Pristolepididae, Asian leaffishes
- Taenianotus triacanthus, the "leaf scorpionfish", a species of marine fish of the family Scorpaenidae
- Brachirus harmandi and B. panoides, Southeast Asian freshwater true soles
