= Lightfish =

Lightfish refers to two groups of bioluminescent fishes:

- Family Phosichthyidae.
- Bristlemouths in the family Gonostomatidae.
