= Black dragonfish =

Black dragonfish is a common name for several fish:

- Bathophilus indicus
- Idiacanthus atlanticus, a barbeled dragonfish of the family Stomiidae
- Idiacanthus fasciola
