= Tripod fish =

Tripod fish is a common name for different species of fish:

- Ipnopidae, a family found worldwide in deep seas, including:
  - Bathypterois grallator, the most famous species in the family
- Triacanthidae, a family from the Indo-Pacific
