= Pickerel River =

Pickerel River may refer to:

- Pickerel River (Ontario), a tributary of the French River system in Ontario,
- Pickerel River (Kansas), a tributary of the Arkansas River system in Kansas.
