= Squawfish =

Squawfish may refer to:

- Ptychocheilus, a genus of fish.
- The Colorado pikeminnow, a species of fish.
- The Northern pikeminnow, a species of fish.
