= Fierasfer =

Fierasfer is a common name for several fishes and may refer to:

- Carapus species
- Echiodon dentatus
