= Firefish =

Firefish may refer to the following groups or species of fish:

- Nemateleotris, a genus of the family dartfish, Ptereleotridae
  - Elegant firefish, purple firefish, Nemateleotris decora
  - Nemateleotris magnifica, fire goby, fire fish, fire dartfish, red fire goby
- Scorpaenidae, firefish, turkeyfish, dragonfish, stingfish
  - Pterois, a genus of venomous marine fish
    - Devil firefish, common lionfish, Pterois miles
    - Clearfin lionfish, radial firefish, tailbar lionfish, radiata lionfish, Pterois radiata
    - Broadbarred firefish, Pterois antennata
  - Blackfoot firefish, Parapterois heterurus

Firefish may also refer to:

- Firefish, Fediverse-compatible social networking software forked from Misskey
