= Mudfish =

Mudfish most commonly refers to species of fish capable of inhabiting low-oxygen, often muddy waterways. The following species are referred to as "mudfish";

== Fish ==
- Bowfin (Amia calva), North America
- Ceratodontiformes, lungfish suborder
  - Protopterus, the genus of African lungfish containing four species
  - Lepidosiren paradoxa, the South American lungfish
- Channidae, the snakehead family
  - Channa, Asian snakeheads
    - Channa striata, also known as the striped snakehead
  - Parachanna, African snakeheads
- Clarias anguillaris, African airbreathing catfish
- Misgurnus, a genus of true loaches found in Europe and Asia
- Orange River mudfish (Labeo capensis), southern Africa
- Neochanna, a fish genus native to New Zealand and south-eastern Australia.

== Other uses ==
- Mudfish, a poetry journal founded by Jill Hoffman

== See also ==
- Lungfish
- Salamanderfish
- Madfish, a wine label
- Mud Fish Pokémon, Mudkip and its evolved forms, Marshtomp and Swampert
