= Speckled trout =

Speckled trout may refer to:

- Brook trout (Salvelinus fontinalis), a freshwater fish in the family Salmonidae
- Cynoscion nebulosus, also called spotted seatrout, a coastal saltwater or brackish water fish in the family Sciaenidae (drums)
- The modified C-135 Stratolifter used by the United States Air Force Chief of Staff
