= Red Snapper (disambiguation) =

Red Snapper is a common name for several types of fish.

It may also refer to:

- Red Snapper (band), an electronic music band from the United Kingdom.
- "Red Snapper", a 2002 hard dance single by British disc jockey K90.
- Ethan Albright, NFL long snapper for the Washington Redskins, known as "The Red Snapper" for his bright red hair
- Red Snapper (cocktail), a variant of a Bloody Mary with gin instead of vodka
- Alternate name to the DiGiCo SD9 digital audio console
- A type of hot dog popular in Maine
