= Boarfish =

Boarfish is the common name of two unrelated groups of fishes:

- All fish of the family Caproidae are called boarfish.
  - A species within the Caproidae is called boarfish, Capros aper.
- Some fish of the family Pentacerotidae are called boarfish.

Additionally, Neocyttus helgae (family Oreosomatidae) is called the false boarfish.
