= Leather jacket (disambiguation) =

A leather jacket is a coat made of real or imitation leather.

Leather jacket or leatherjacket may also refer to:

- Leather Jackets (album), a 1986 album by Elton John
- Leather Jackets (film), a 1992 crime drama film by Lee Drysdale
- Leather Jacket (film), a 2023 Iranian film
- Barklya syringifolia or leather jacket, a species of Australian trees
- Leatherjacket fish, Oligoplites saurus, a species of jack in the family Carangidae
- Leatherjacket or filefish, family of tropical to subtropical tetraodontiform marine fish
- Leatherjacket, the larva of the crane fly
