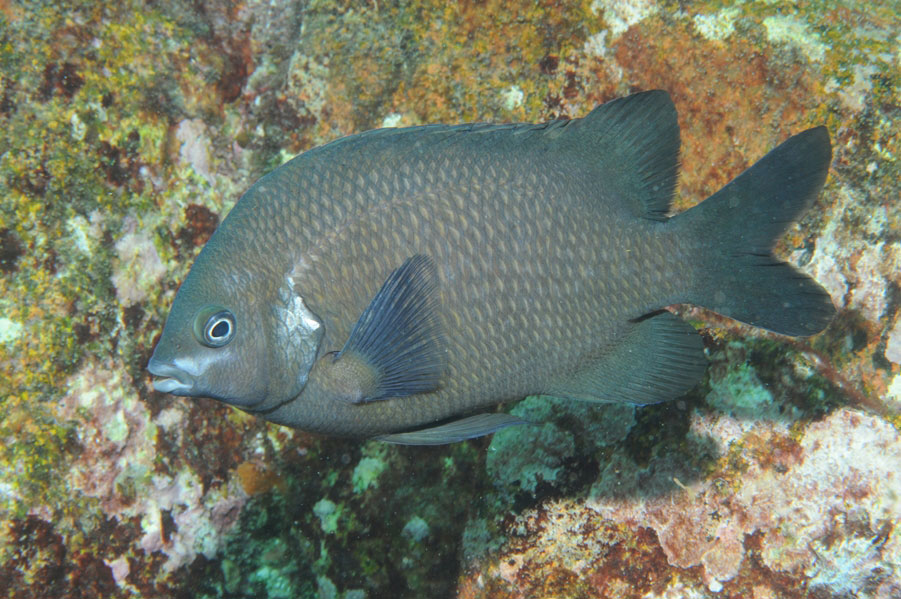
- adult

Conservation status
- Least Concern (IUCN 3.1)

Scientific classification
- Kingdom: Animalia
- Phylum: Chordata
- Class: Actinopterygii
- Order: Blenniiformes
- Family: Pomacentridae
- Genus: Parma
- Species: P. microlepis

Binomial name
- Parma microlepis Günther, 1862

= Parma microlepis =

Species of fish

Parma microlepis, commonly known as the white-ear, is a species of fish in the family Pomacentridae. This fish is endemic to Eastern Australia.

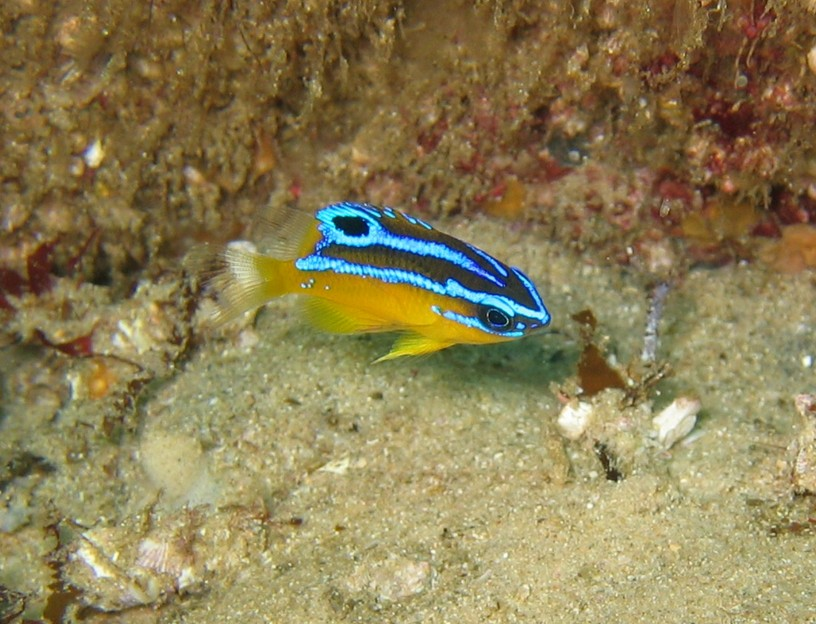
Parma microlepis (juvenile)

== Description ==
This species grows to ~20 cm. The White-ear changes colour as it grows but always has a white mark on its 'ear'. Young juveniles are brightly coloured but as the fish grows the colours fade to the adult colouration of yellowish-brown to grey or black".

== Distribution ==
The white-ear is endemic to Australia, occurring from northern New South Wales to northern Tasmania.

== Behaviour ==
During the breeding season, aggressive males may bite divers.

== Habitat ==
Parma microlepis are benthic coastal reef inhabitants and are commonly found on reef, in depths of 1–55 m.

== Diet ==
Omnivorous.
