= Scissortail rasbora =

Scissortail rasbora is a name used for several Asian freshwater fish that sometimes are seen in the aquarium trade:

- Dwarf scissortail rasbora (Rasbosoma spilocerca)
- Gangetic scissortail rasbora (Rasbora rasbora)
- Greater scissortail (Rasbora caudimaculata)
- Three-lined rasbora or scissortail rasbora (Rasbora trilineata)
