= Moonfish =

Moonfish may refer to several groups of fishes:

- Family Monodactylidae (properly moonyfishes)
- Ocean sunfish is called "moon fish" in many languages
- Opah, genus Lampris
- Genus Citharinus, especially Citharinus citharus
- Genus Mene
  - Mene maculata, only extant member of the genus
- Selene (fish)
- Atlantic spadefish (Chaetodipterus faber)
- Cusk (fish)
- Southern platyfish

== Other uses ==
- Moonfish, a Throughbred horse which placed second in the 1988 Haynes, Hanson and Clark Conditions Stakes
- Moonfish (pilot), call sign of a squadron commander in the Ukrainian Air Force
- Moonfish (film), an animated science fiction drama
- Moonfish (My Hero Academia), a character in the manga series My Hero Academia
