= Grayling =

Grayling or Greyling may refer to:

== Animals ==
=== Fish ===
- Grayling, generically, any fish of the genus Thymallus in the family Salmonidae
  - European grayling (Thymallus thymallus), the type species of the genus Thymallus
  - Arctic grayling (Thymallus arcticus)
- Australian grayling (Prototroctes maraena), a fish in the family Retropinnidae
- New Zealand grayling (Prototroctes oxyrhynchus), a recently extinct fish of New Zealand

=== Butterflies ===
- Grayling, many of the butterflies in the genus Hipparchia and Oeneis
- Grayling (butterfly) (Hipparchia semele)
- Common wood-nymph or grayling (Cercyonis pegala)

== Places ==
=== United States ===
- Grayling, Alaska
- Grayling, Michigan
- Grayling Charter Township, Michigan
- Camp Grayling, National Guard training facility near Grayling, Michigan

== People ==
- A. C. Grayling (born 1949), British philosopher
- Chris Grayling (born 1962), British politician
- Eduard Greyling (born 1948), South African ballet dancer
- Lance Greyling (born 1973), South African politician and civil servant
- Piet Greyling (born 1942), South African rugby union player
- Dean Greyling (born 1986), South African rugby union player
- Carl Greyling, South African politician

== Other uses ==
- Grayling (PR firm), a public relations firm
- USS Grayling, several US Navy ships and submarines
- Dr Grayling Russell, a fictional character in the Inspector Morse TV series
