= Mandarinfish =

Mandarinfish or mandarin fish may refer to:

== Saltwater aquarium fish ==
- Synchiropus splendidus, also known as the mandarin goby and the mandarin dragonet, native to the Pacific Ocean
- Picturesque dragonet or Synchiropus picturatus, also known as the spotted mandarin, psychedelic mandarin or target mandarin, native to the Indo-West Pacific

== Freshwater perch ==
- Siniperca chuatsi, also known as the Chinese perch, native to China and Russia
- Golden mandarin fish or Siniperca scherzeri, also known as the leopard mandarin fish, native to East Asia

== See also ==
- Mandarin dogfish (Cirrhigaleus barbifer), a dogfish shark species native to the North Pacific
- Southern Mandarin dogfish (Cirrhigaleus australis), a related dogfish shark species native to Australia and New Zealand
