= Inanga =

Inanga may refer to

- Common galaxias or inanga, a species of freshwater fish
- Dwarf inanga or Galaxias gracilis, a species of freshwater fish
- Inanga (instrument), a type of string instrument in Africa
