= King of the herrings =

King of the herrings is a common name for several fishes and may refer to:

- Regalecus glesne
- Trachipterus arcticus
