= Sheepshead =

Sheepshead, Sheephead, or Sheep's Head, may refer to:

== Fish ==
- Archosargus probatocephalus, a medium-sized saltwater fish of the Atlantic Ocean
- Freshwater drum, Aplodinotus grunniens, a medium-sized freshwater fish of North and Central America
- Semicossyphus, a genus of medium-sized saltwater wrasses of the Pacific Ocean
- Sheepshead minnow, Cyprinodon variegatus variegatus, a small brackish-water fish
- Sheepshead porgy, Calamus penna, a medium-sized saltwater fish of the Atlantic Ocean

== Places ==
- Sheep's Head, a headland in Ireland
- Sheepshead Bay, Brooklyn, New York, United States
- Sheepshead Mountains

== Other uses ==
- Smalahove, a dish made from a sheep's head
- Khash (dish)
- Sheepshead (card game), a trick-taking card game
- Sheepshead Bay Houses
- Sheepshead Bay Speedway
- Sheepshead Bay Stakes
