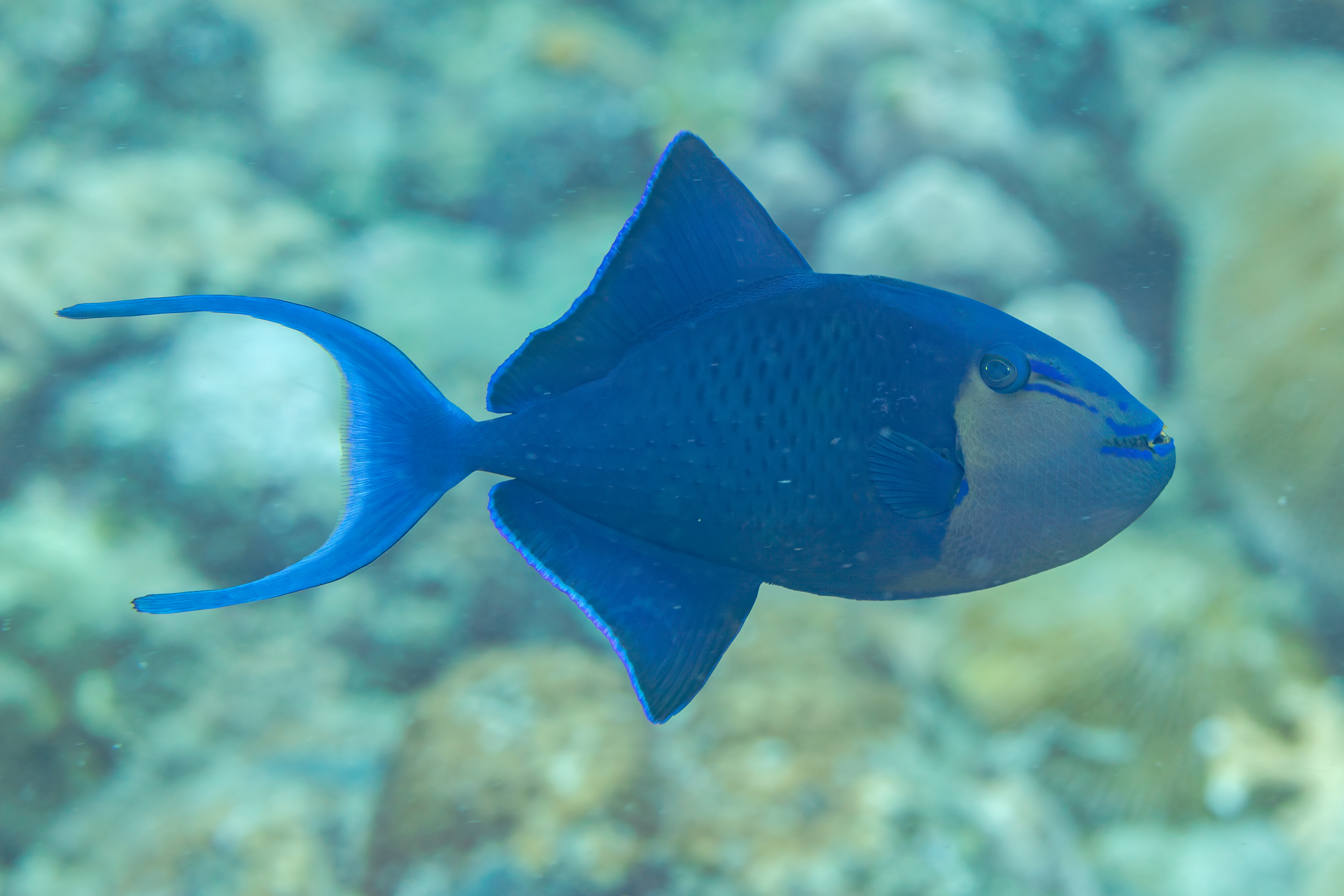
- In the Philippines

Scientific classification
- Kingdom: Animalia
- Phylum: Chordata
- Class: Actinopterygii
- Division: Teleostei
- Order: Tetraodontiformes
- Family: Balistidae
- Genus: Odonus; Gistel, 1848
- Species: O. niger

Binomial name
- Odonus niger Rüppell, 1836

= Redtoothed triggerfish =

Species of fish

The redtoothed triggerfish (Odonus niger) or Niger triggerfish is a triggerfish of the tropical Indo-Pacific area, and the sole member of its genus. Some other common names include redtooth triggerfish, Niger triggerfish, blue triggerfish, redfang triggerfish, and redtooth filefish.

== Distribution ==
The redtoothed triggerfish lives in the widespread Indo-Pacific Ocean and Red Sea. They are found at the African east coast to Marquesas and Society islands. They can also be found as far north as Southern Japan and as far south as the Great Barrier Reef in Australia.

== Description ==
Redtoothed triggerfish are normally deep blue or purple with a light blue head, bluish-green markings on their heads and glowing light blue margins on the tail lobes and fins. Just like other fish in the family Balistidae, the tail is lyre-shaped. The mouth of the triggerfish seems to be grinning and it maintains tiny red teeth that are needle-sharp with two teeth in the upper jaw which can be seen when its mouth is closed. These triggerfish are one of the more peaceful triggers in the family but can become threatening with age and can perform a grunting-type sound. They can change their color depending on their mood, food, feeding, and water quality from purple to blue and bluish-green.

The average length is from 9 to 12 inches (23 to 30 cm). Their pectoral fins are quite small; as a result, they steer mostly with their dorsal and anal fins, which makes them very maneuverable, and they also use these fins to move with an exotic type of propulsion reminiscent of a propeller. It is one of the most singular swimming styles in the ocean.

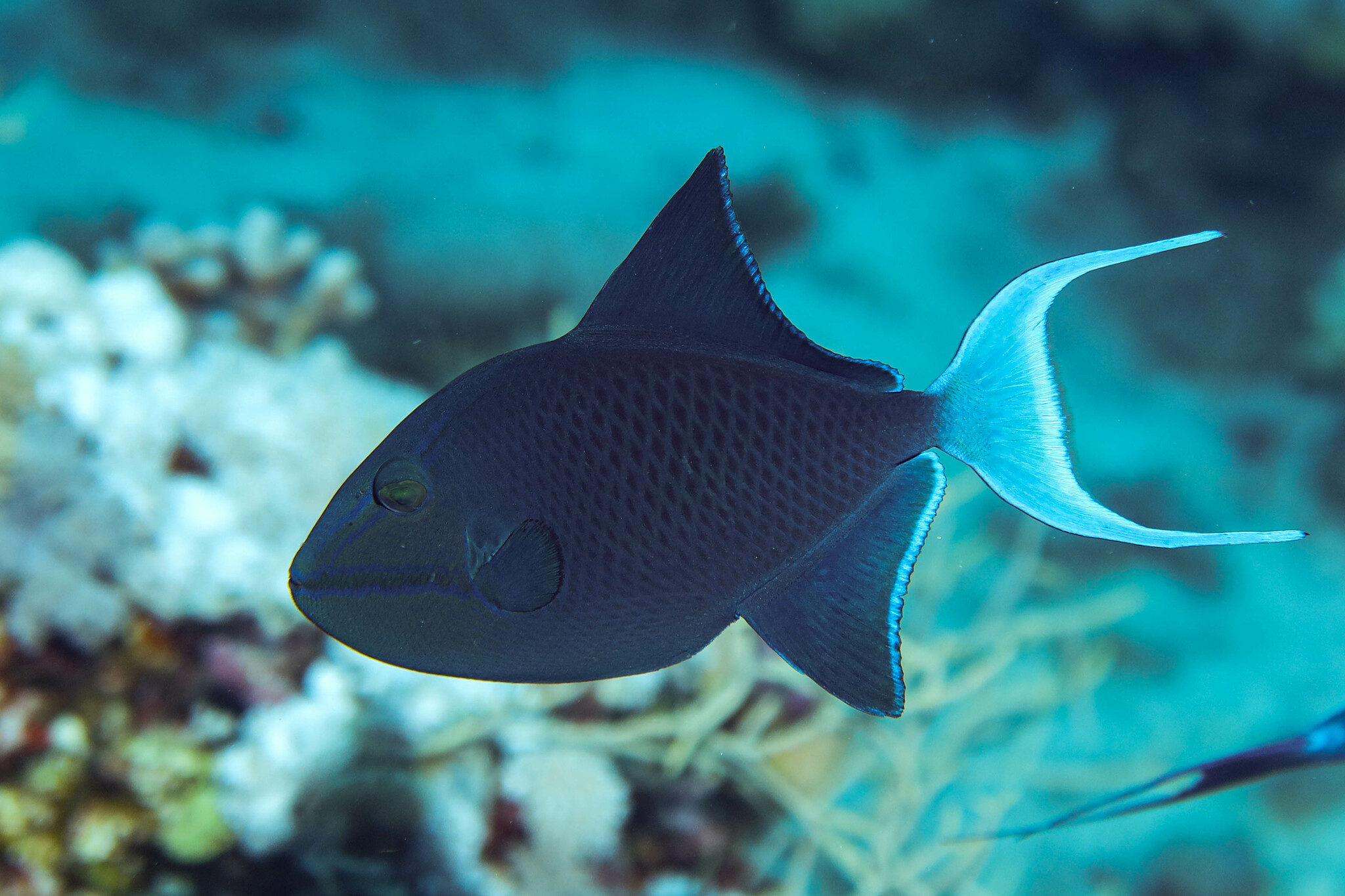
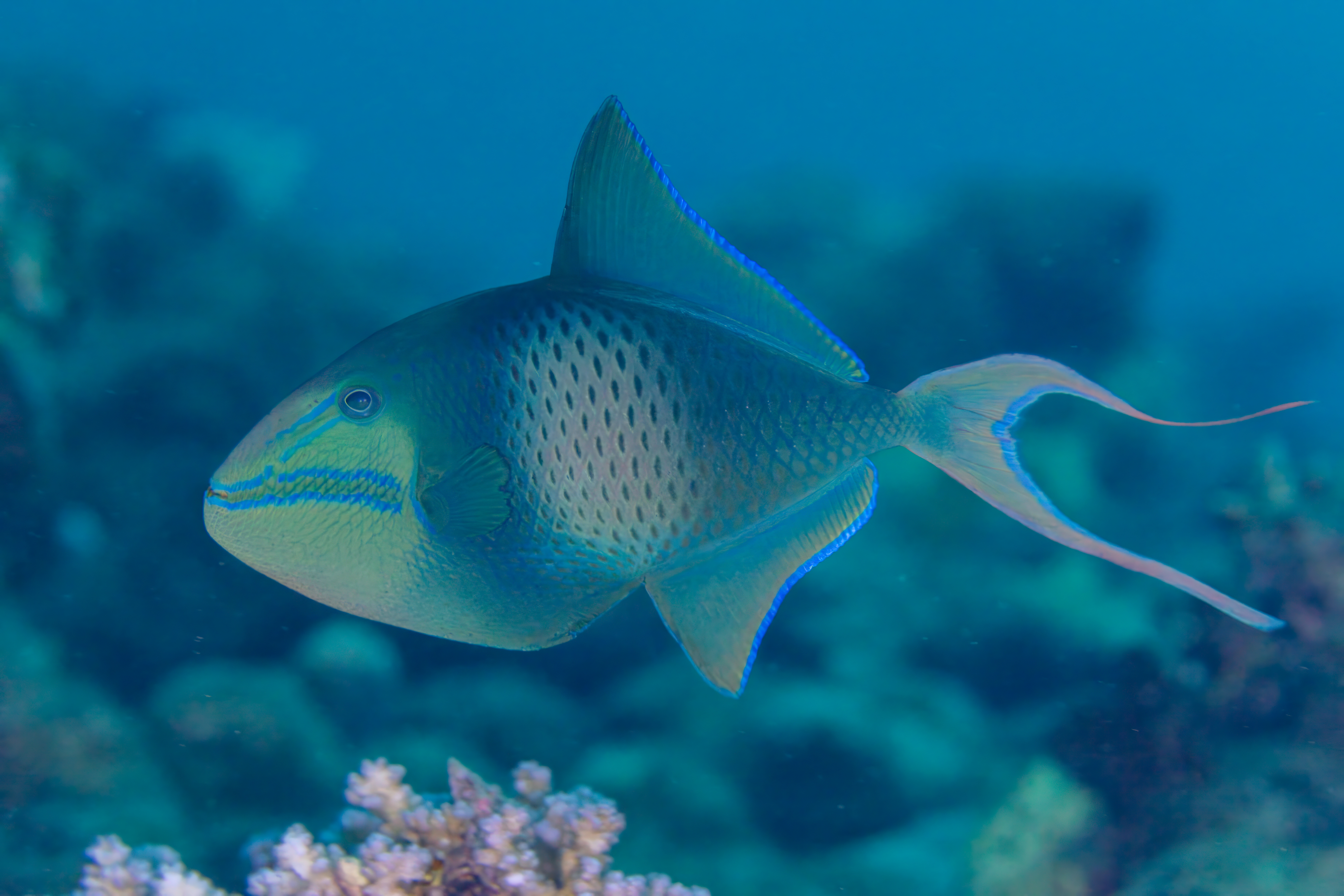
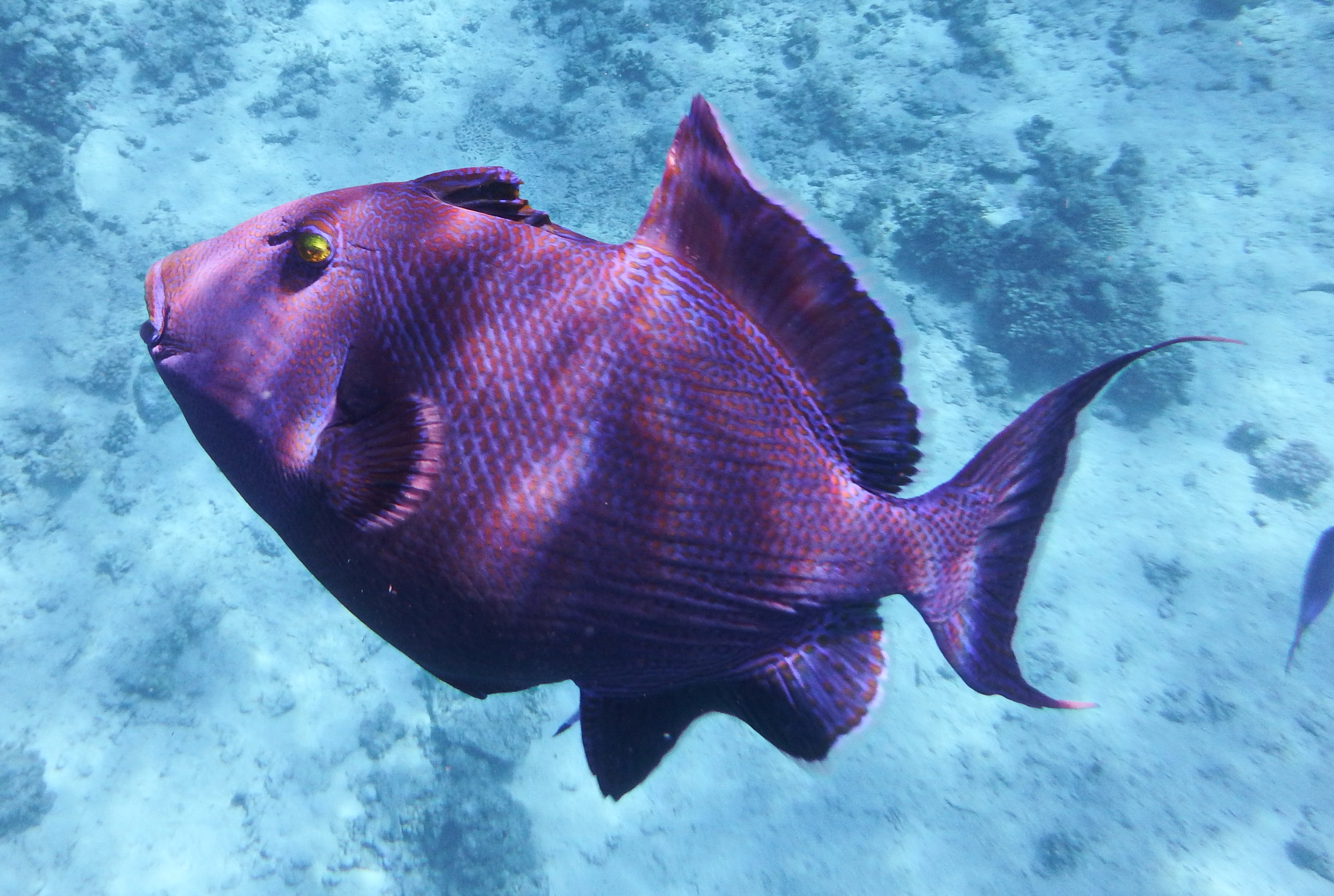
In the Red Sea. Colour is variable in the species.

== Behavior and diet ==
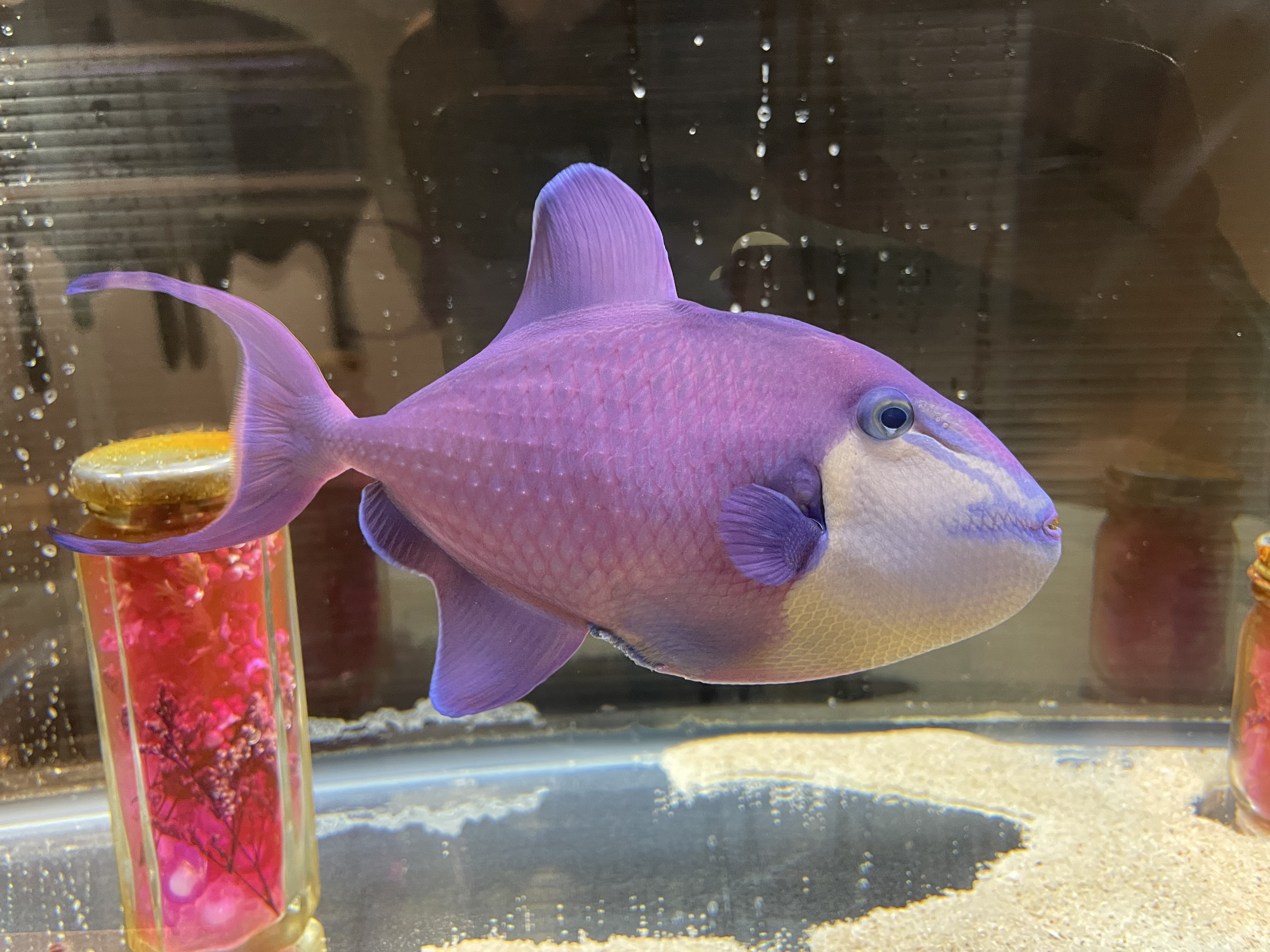
In captivity

Redtoothed triggerfish may inhabit reef channels or long slopes that have strong water currents. They survive by hiding under or between rocks and in crevices so they don't get swept away by the water currents. They also may live in the coastal shallow inshore waters at depths of around 30–100 feet (9.1–30.5 m). Redtoothed triggerfish are omnivorous and mostly opportunistic feeders, with crustaceans as its primary food source. They also feed on zooplankton and algae, and remains of cephalopods and fishes have been found in their stomach.

== Reproduction ==
The redtoothed triggerfish have distinct pairing. They meet at mating grounds where males set up their territories. They build nests to lay their eggs in. The females take care of the eggs while both males and females guard the eggs waiting for them to hatch. While they can breed in the wild, they cannot breed in aquariums.

== Gallery ==
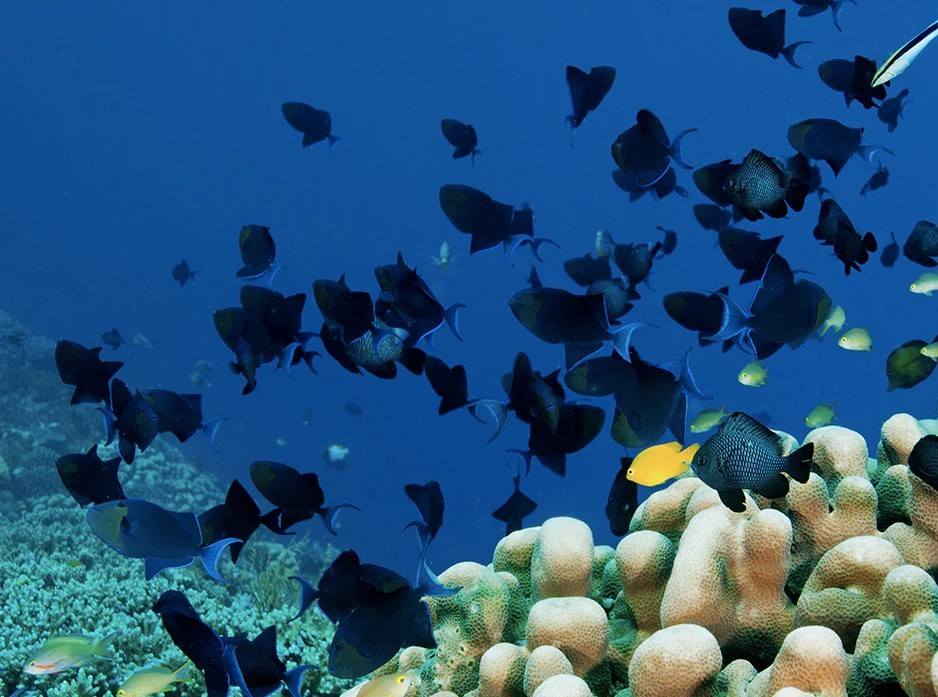
Shoals of redtoothed triggerfish and threespot dascyllus in Wakatobi National Park

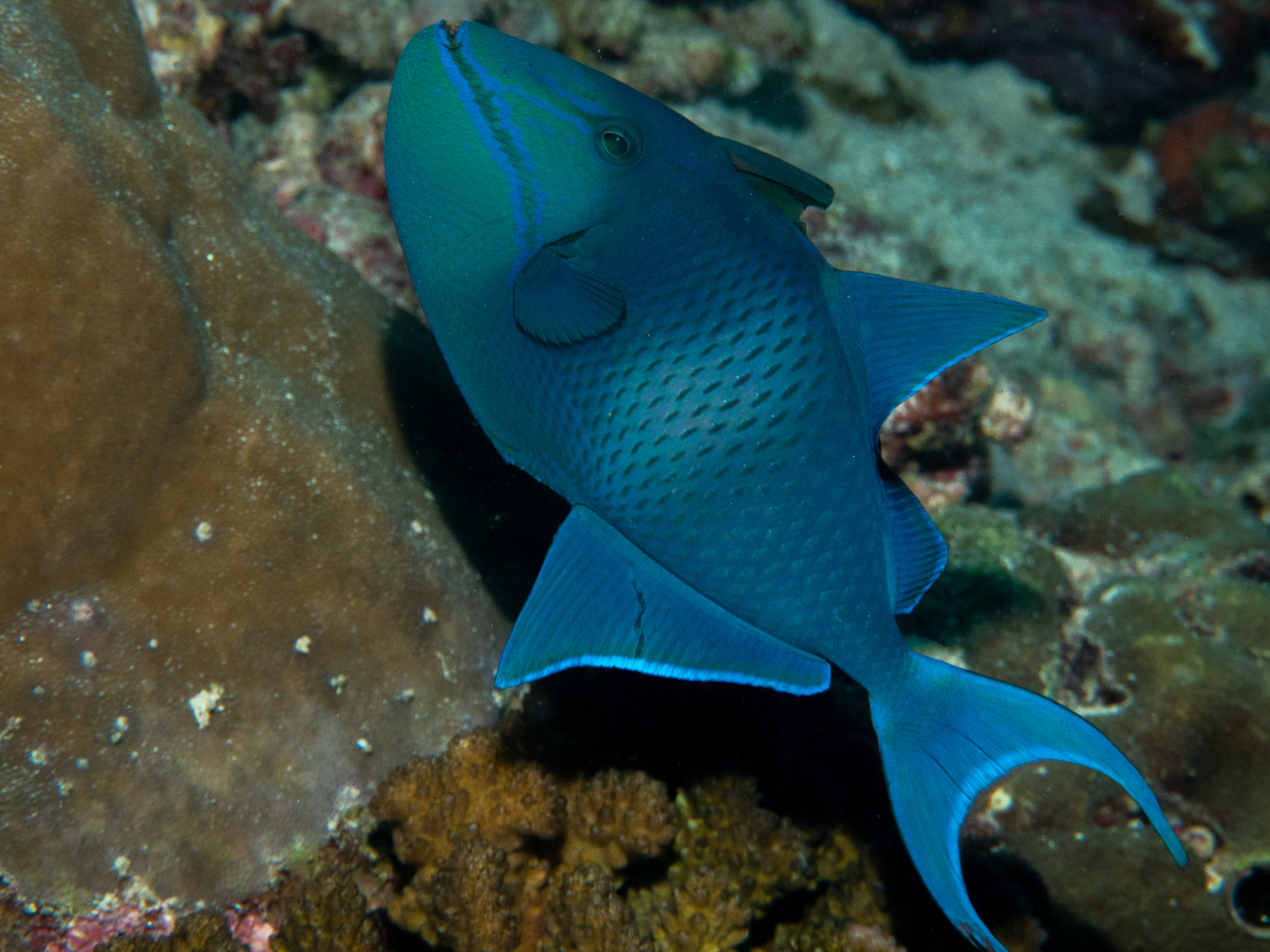
In the Maldives

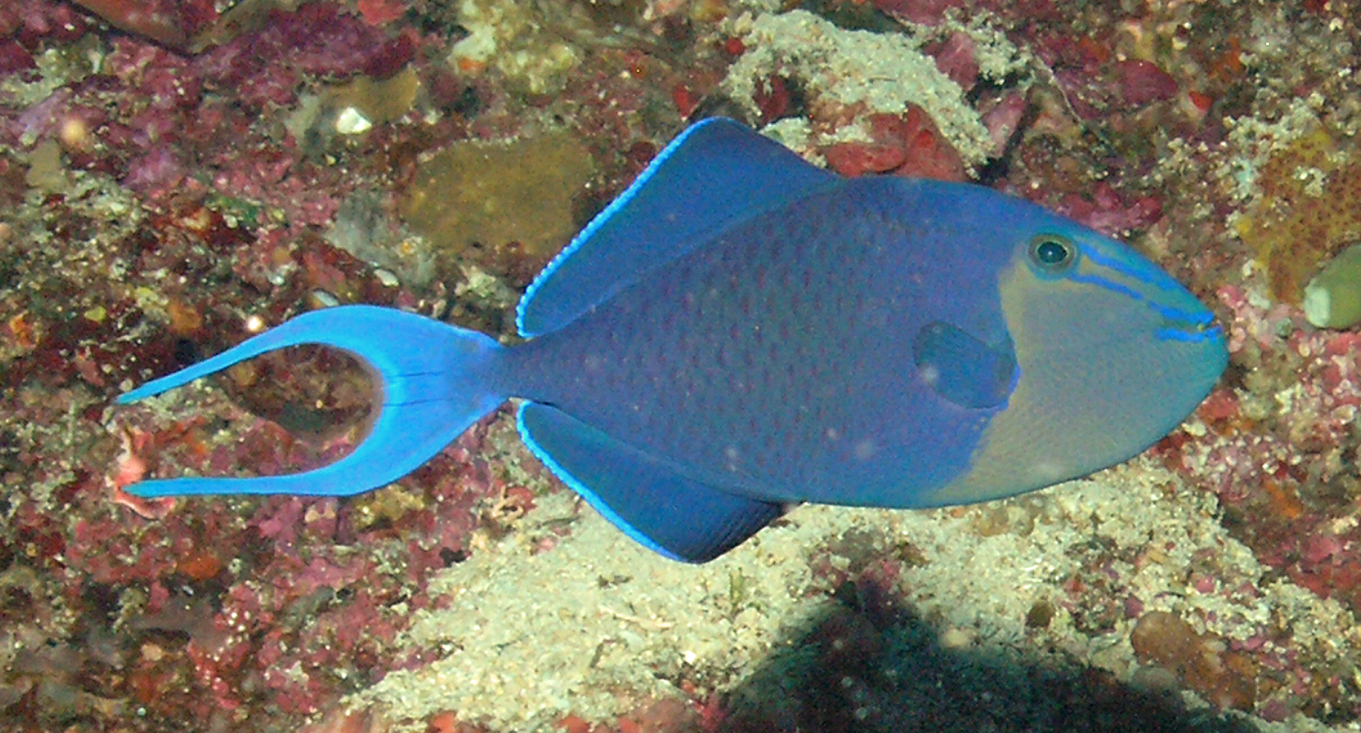
In North Sulawesi

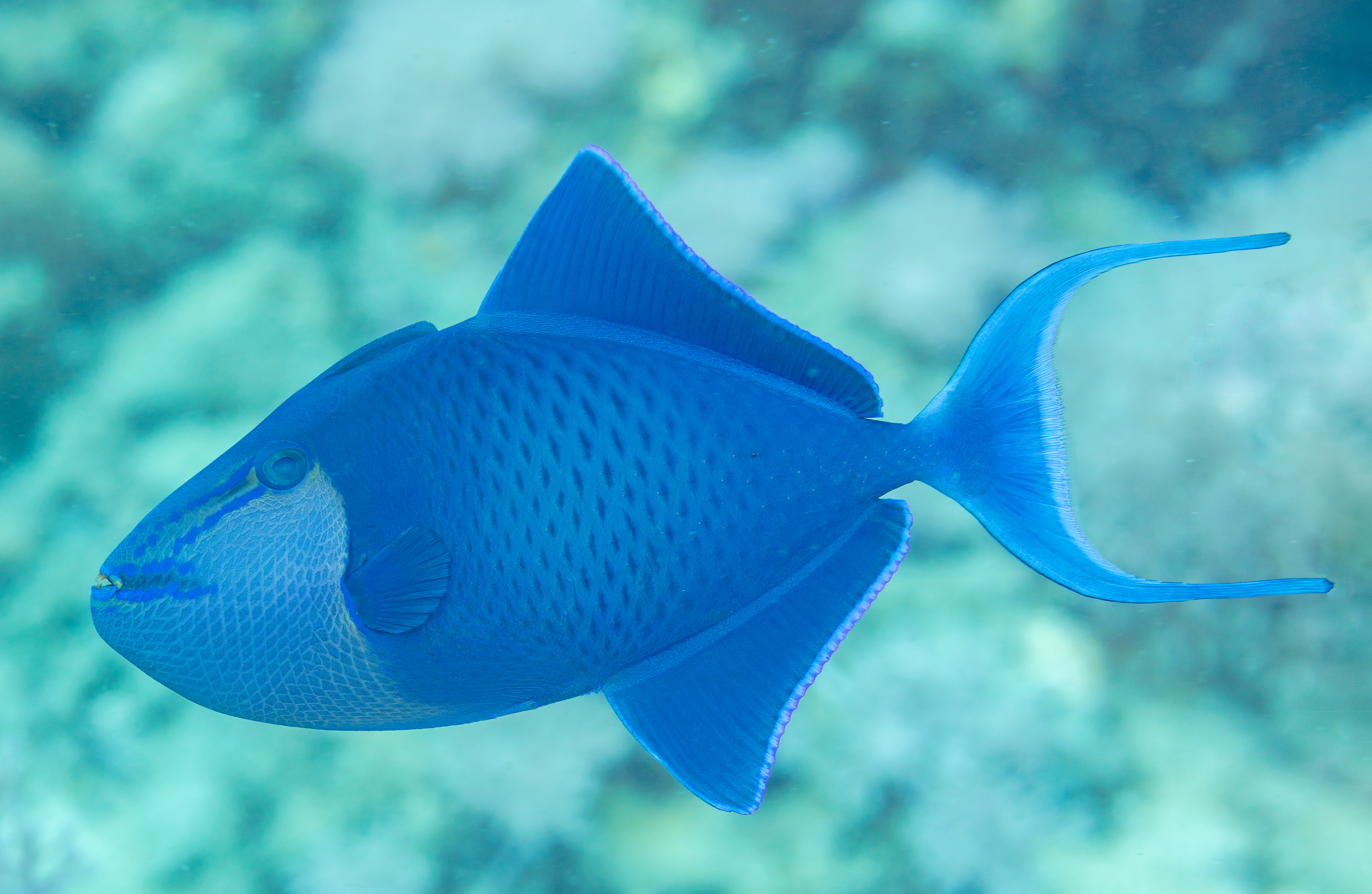
In the Philippines

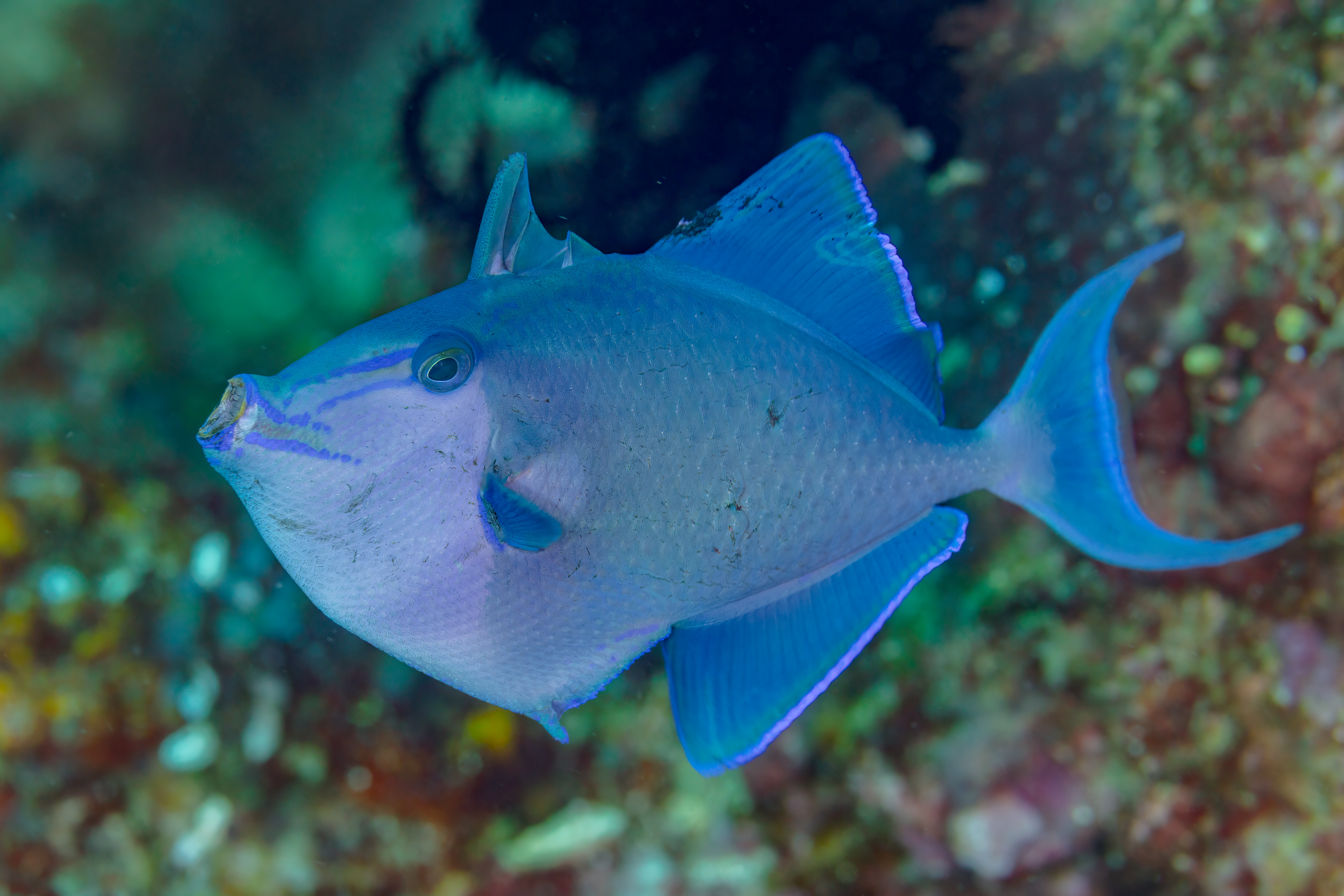
Showing fully spread dorsal and ventral spines, in the Philippines

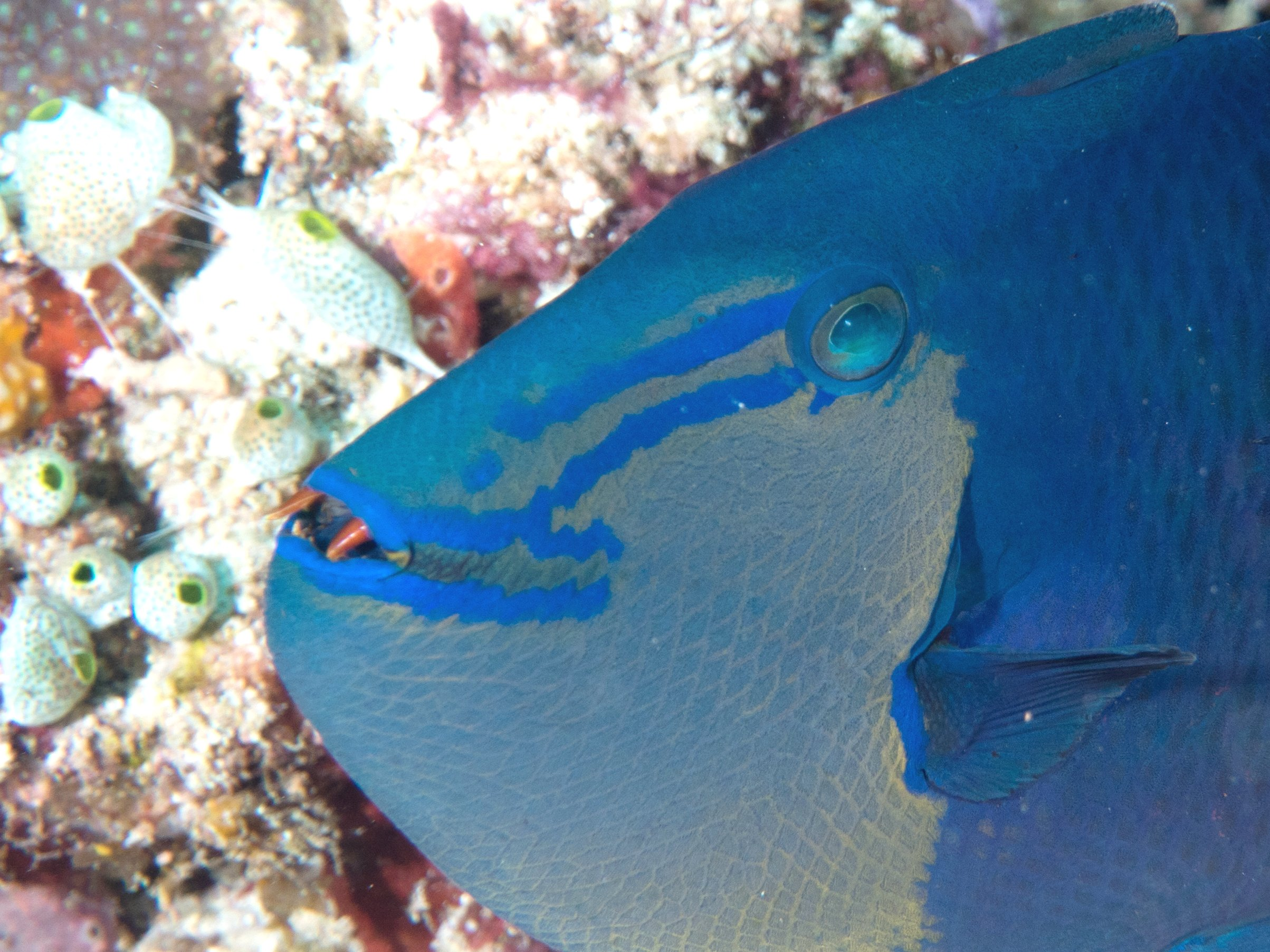
Closeup of the eponymous red teeth, in Indonesia

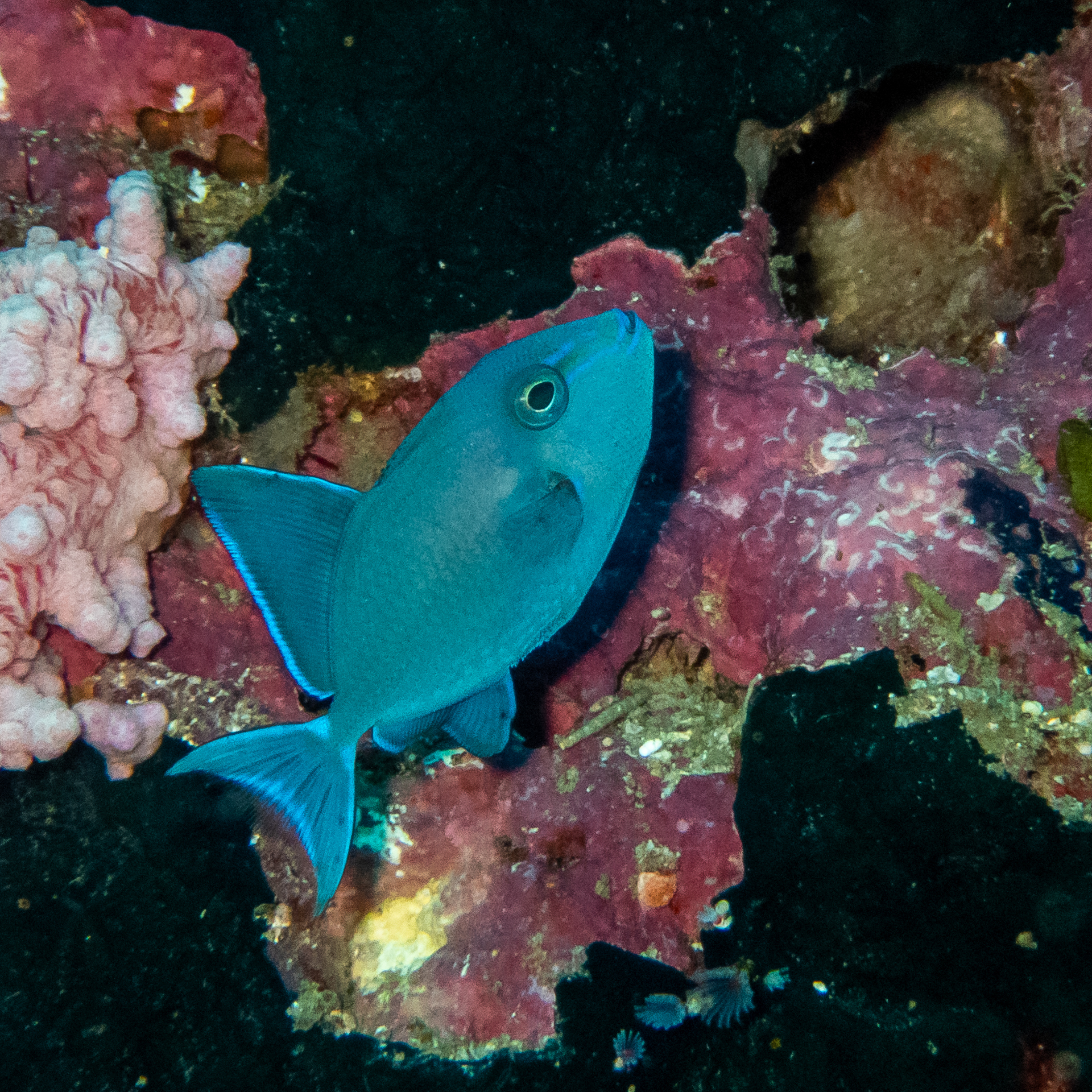
Juvenile, in Indonesia
