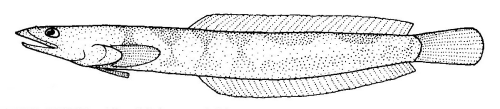
- Drawing by Dr Tony Ayling

Scientific classification
- Kingdom: Animalia
- Phylum: Chordata
- Class: Actinopterygii
- Order: Acropomatiformes
- Family: Creediidae
- Genus: Tewara
- Species: T. cranwellae

Binomial name
- Tewara cranwellae Griffin, 1933

= New Zealand sand diver =

Species of ray-finned fish

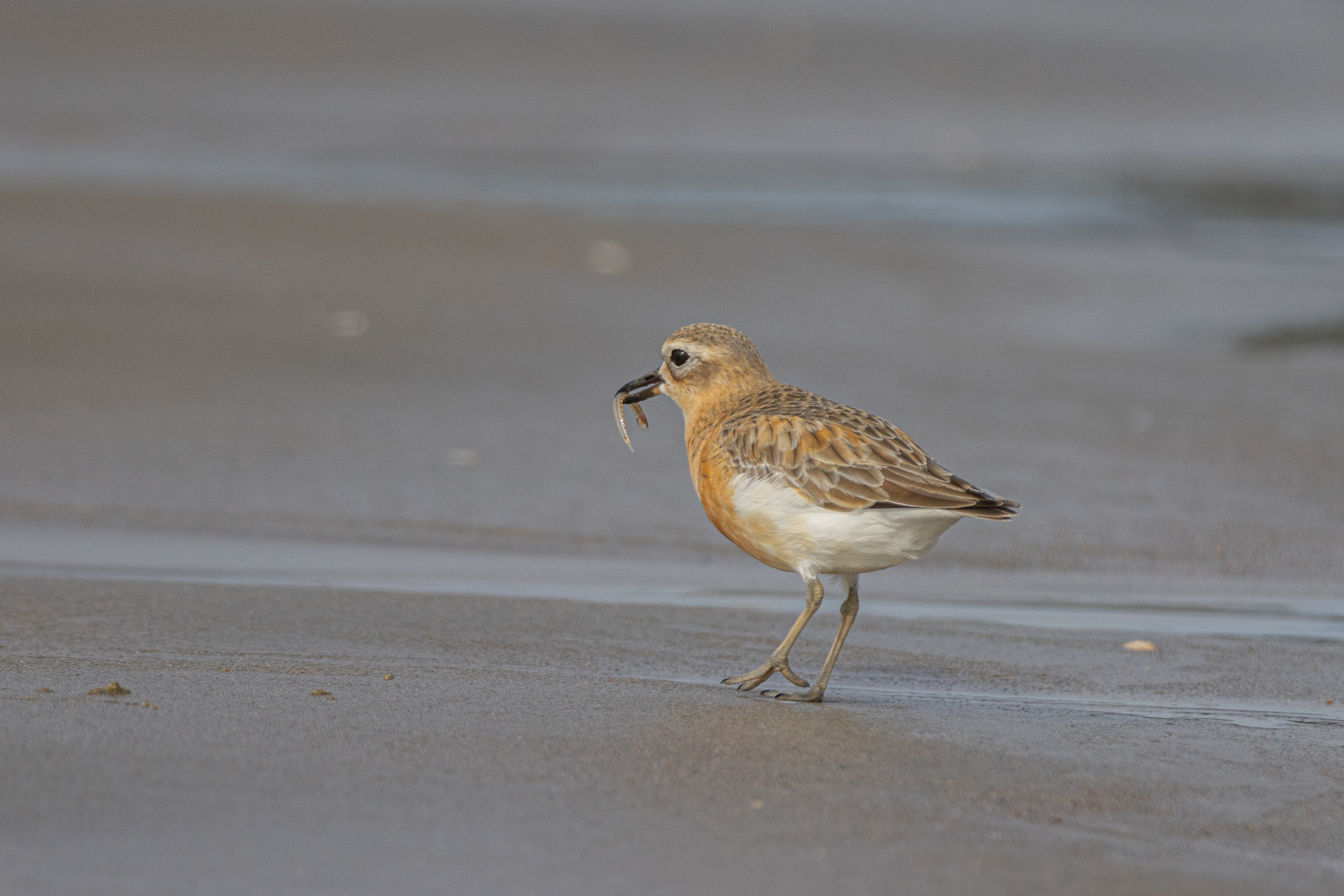
A New Zealand sand diver being eaten by a dotterel at Pakiri Beach

The New Zealand sand diver (Tewara cranwellae) is a species of sandburrower endemic to the waters around New Zealand where it can be found in tide pools and areas with sandy substrates down to a depth of 5 metres (16 ft). This species can grow to a length of 7 centimetres (2.8 in) TL. This species is the only known member of its genus.

== Taxonomy ==
The species was first described by Louis T. Griffin in 1933, who initially used the spelling Tewara cranwelli for the binomial name of the fish. The type specimen was collected from Smugglers Bay, Whangārei Harbour, in November 1931 by Lucy Cranwell. Griffin named the species after Cranwell in her honour.
