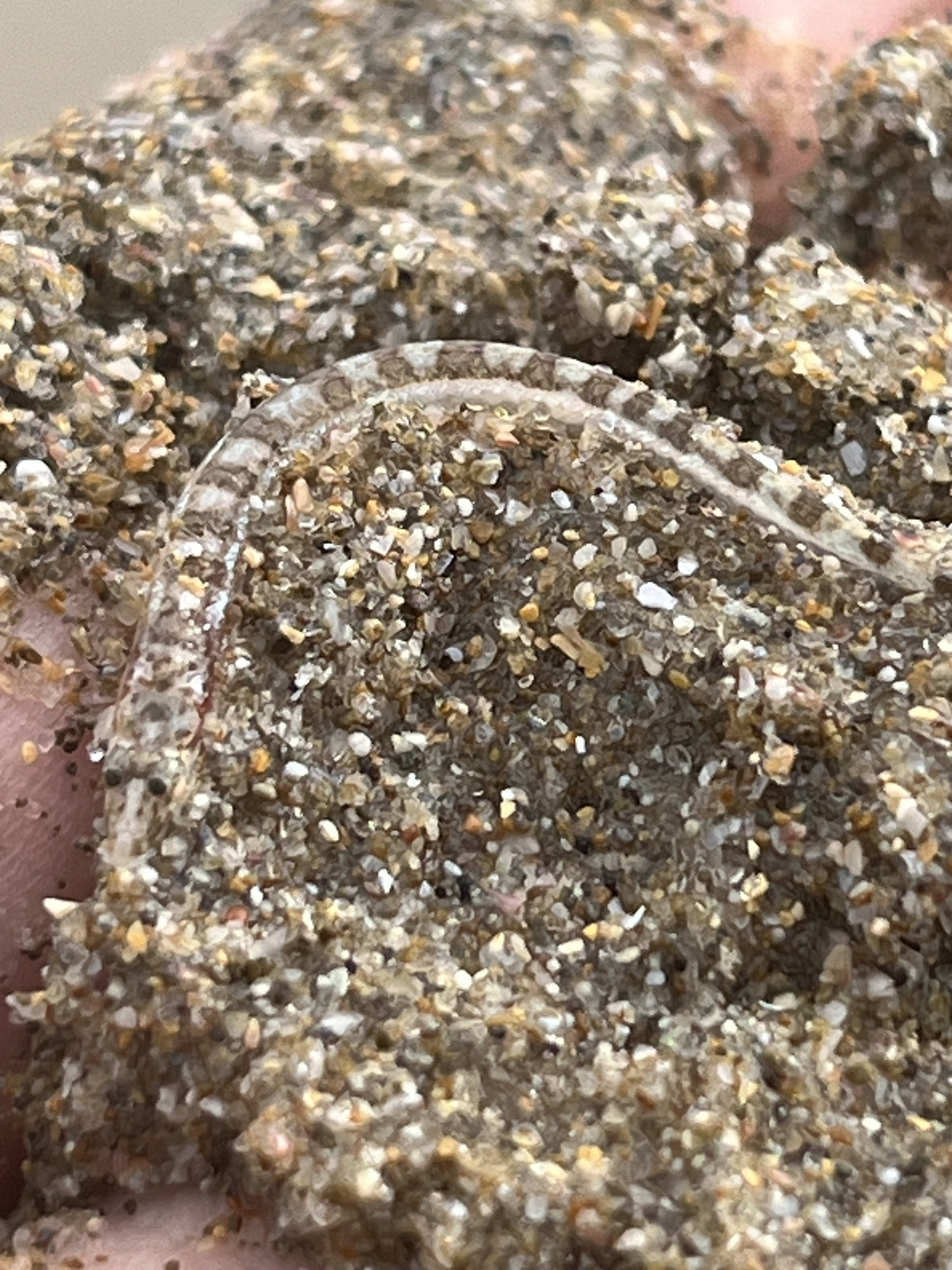
- Limnichthys polyactis in sand at Whangamatā, New Zealand

Scientific classification
- Kingdom: Animalia
- Phylum: Chordata
- Class: Actinopterygii
- Order: Acropomatiformes
- Family: Creediidae
- Genus: Limnichthys
- Species: L. polyactis

Binomial name
- Limnichthys polyactis J. S. Nelson, 1978

= Long-finned sand diver =

Species of ray-finned fish

The long-finned sand diver (Limnichthys polyactis) or tommyfish, is a species of sandburrower endemic to the coastal waters around the North Island of New Zealand to depths of about 6 metres (20 ft), on sandy or gravelly bottoms. It can reach a length of 7.2 centimetres (2.8 in) TL.
