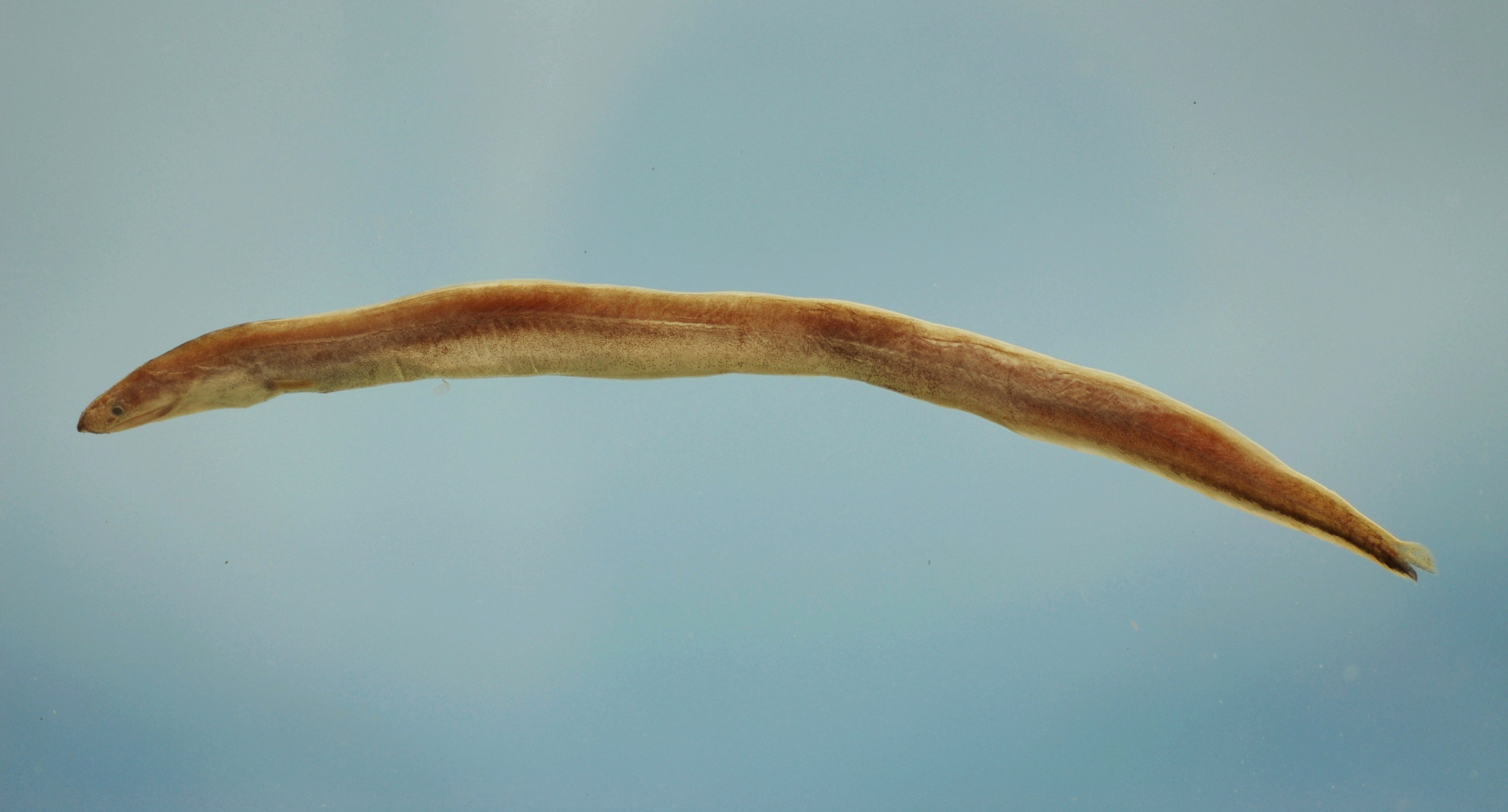

Scientific classification
- Kingdom: Animalia
- Phylum: Chordata
- Class: Actinopterygii
- Order: Anguilliformes
- Family: Synaphobranchidae
- Genus: Dysomma
- Species: D. anguillare

Binomial name
- Dysomma anguillare Barnard, 1923

Synonyms
- Dysomma anguillaris Barnard, 1923; Dysomma zanzibarensis Norman, 1939

= Dysomma anguillare =

Species of fish

Dysomma anguillare, the shortbelly eel, stout moray, mustard eel or arrowtooth eel, is an eel in the family Synaphobranchidae (cutthroat eels). It was described by Keppel Harcourt Barnard in 1923. It is a marine, tropical eel which is known from the western Atlantic Ocean and Indo-Western Pacific, including the United States, Venezuela, South Africa, Zanzibar, and Japan. It lives at a depth range of 30 to 270 metres (98 to 886 ft), and inhabits muddy sediments in coastal waters and large rivermouths. Males can reach a maximum total length of 52 centimetres (20 in).

The shortbelly eel is of no commercial interest to fisheries.
