= Loach (disambiguation) =

Loach may refer to:

- Fishes of the superfamily Cobitoidea, bottom-dwelling freshwater fishes with several barbels near the mouth, found in Eurasia and northwestern Africa, related to minnows
  - Algae eaters, fishes of the family Gyrinocheilidae, are sometimes referred to as sucking loaches
- Ken Loach (born 1936), English film director
- Mikaela Loach, British climate justice activist
- Scott Loach (born 1988), English footballer
- Light Observation Helicopter (LOH, pronounced as loach), U.S. Army helicopter program
- "Loach", colloquial name of the Hughes OH-6 Cayuse military helicopter
