= Sandfish =

Sandfish may refer to:

== Fish ==
- Trichodontidae, known as sandfishes, a family of perch-like fish:
  - Pacific sandfish, the species Trichodon trichodon
  - Arctoscopus japonicus, known as sailfin sandfish or Japanese sandfish
- Gonorynchus, known as beaked sandfish, a family of long thin ray-finned fish
  - Gonorynchus gonorynchus, known as sandfish
- Southern sandfish, a family Leptoscopidae of perch-like fish
- Belted sandfish, a species Serranus subligarius of fish
- Clanwilliam sandfish, a species Labeo seeberi of fish
- Awaous tajasica, known as sand fish, a species of goby fish

== Other animals ==
- Scincus scincus, known as sandfish, a species of skink (lizard)
- Holothuria scabra, known as sandfish, a species of sea cucumber
- Thelenota ananas, known as sandfish, another species of sea cucumber
