= Tiparos =

Thai food company

- Product type: Condiment
- Country: Thailand
- Introduced: 1910; 116 years ago
- Markets: Worldwide
- Website: www.tiparos.com

Tiparos (Thai: ทิพรส) is a Thai fish sauce condiment brand under the Tang Sang Hah Company, established in Chonburi Province in 1919. The company was named "Bowdang", before changing its name in the mid-20th century. The company's founder, Laichaing Sae Tang, first began to formulate his recipe for fish sauce in 1910. Tiparos is described as a "Thai style" fish sauce, with a different and bolder flavor than Vietnamese styles.
