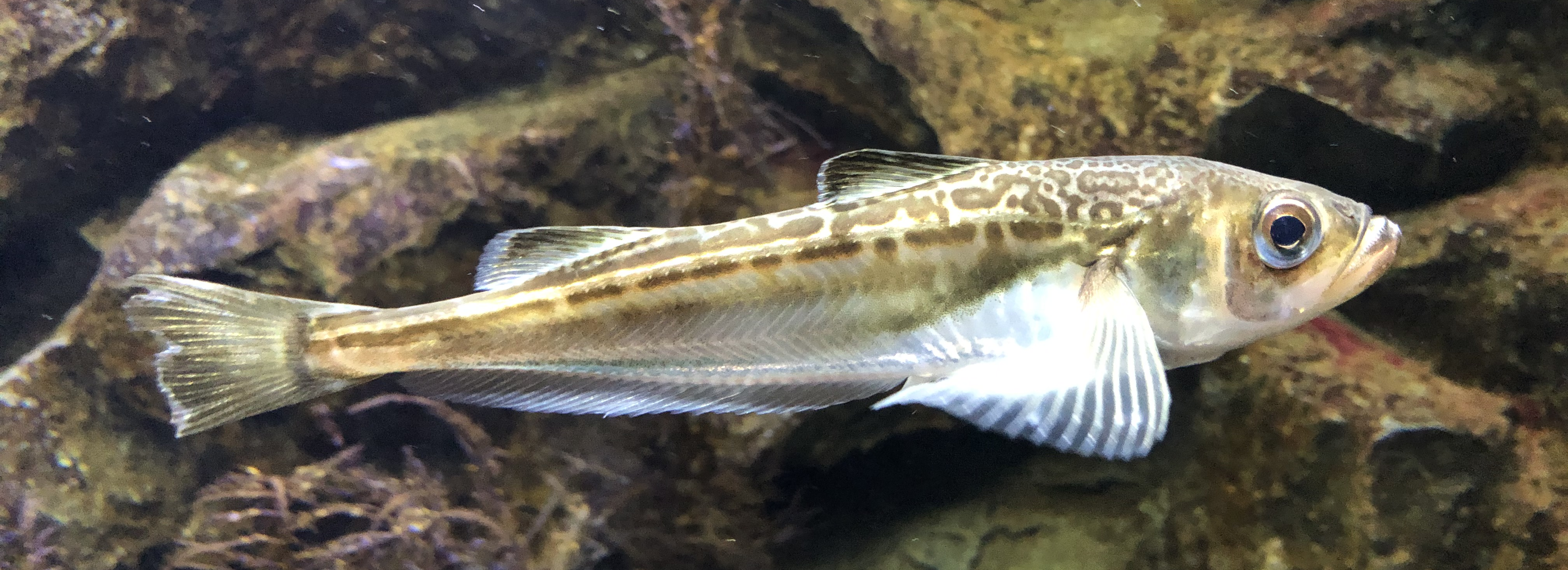

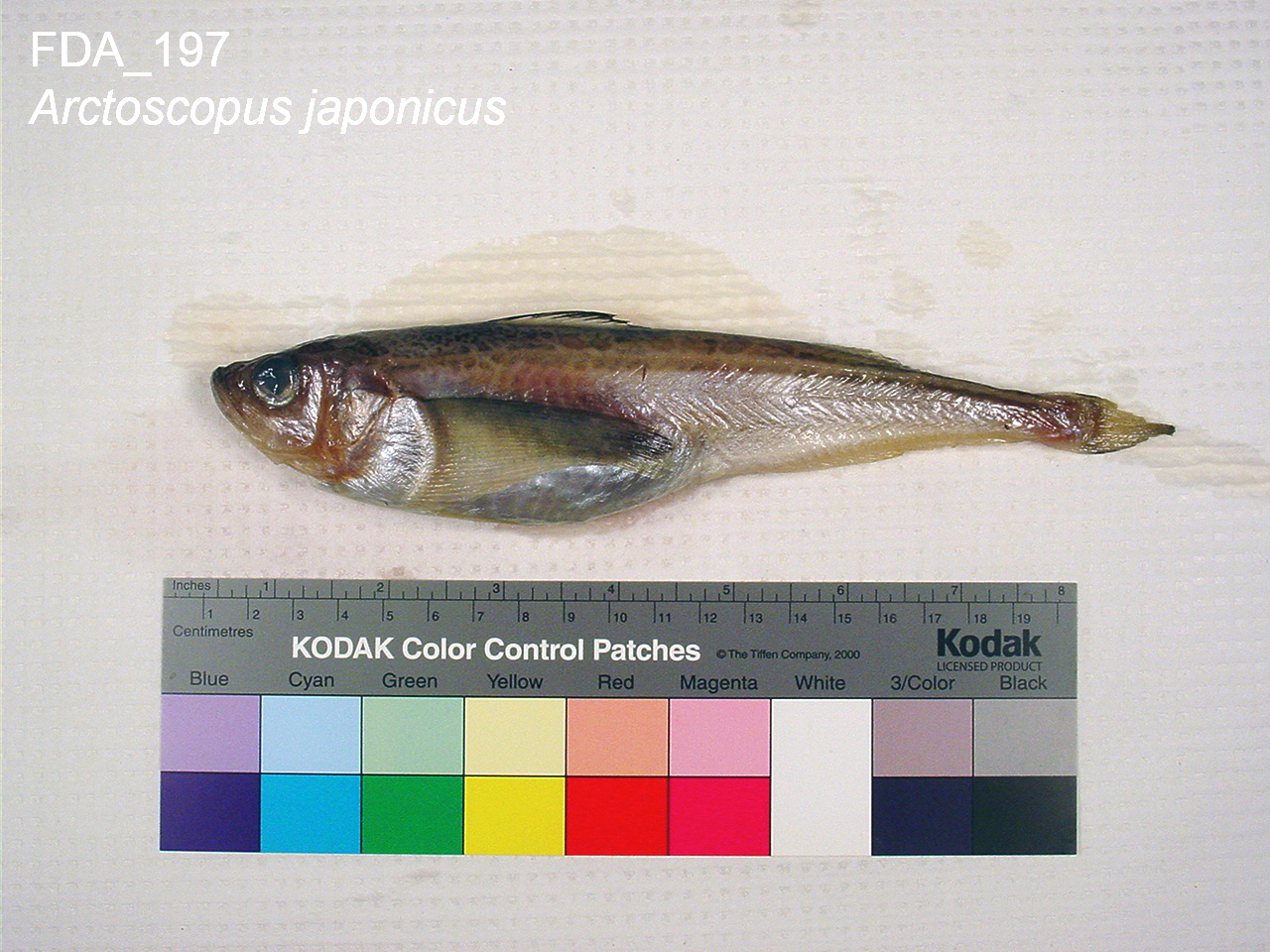

Scientific classification
- Kingdom: Animalia
- Phylum: Chordata
- Class: Actinopterygii
- Division: Teleostei
- Order: Perciformes
- Suborder: Cottoidei
- Family: Trichodontidae
- Genus: Arctoscopus; Jordan and Evermann, 1896
- Species: A. japonicus

Binomial name
- Arctoscopus japonicus (Steindachner, 1881)

Synonyms
- Trichodon japonicus Steindachner, 1881

= Japanese sandfish =

Species of fish

The Japanese sandfish (Arctoscopus japonicus), also known as the sailfin sandfish, is a species of fish of the Percomorpha (perch-like) clade in the order Trachiniformes, being one of the two genera in the family Trichodontidae, the sandfishes. Known in Japan as hatahata (ハタハタ, 鰰, 鱩, 燭魚), it is a commercially important fish especially for Akita and Yamagata prefectures. Its habitat occurs in sandy-mud bottoms ranging from the Sea of Japan to the Okhotsk Sea.

As a food source, the fish has mostly been sourced locally from the coastal region of the Sea of Japan, and has been designated the official prefectural fish of Akita Prefecture. The fish, which is scaleless, may be prepared whole as braised or grilled fish, and has a mucilaginous consistency. It is also dried to make stockfish; salted, dried, and made into himono; and cured in miso as misozuke. It is the main ingredient of the fish sauce called shottsuru. The egg masses are known as burikko. In Korean the fish is called dorumuk (도루묵).

The fish had also been used dried or in fish meal form as fertilizer, and shipped to agricultural areas at one time, into the 20th century.

== Life cycle and behavior ==
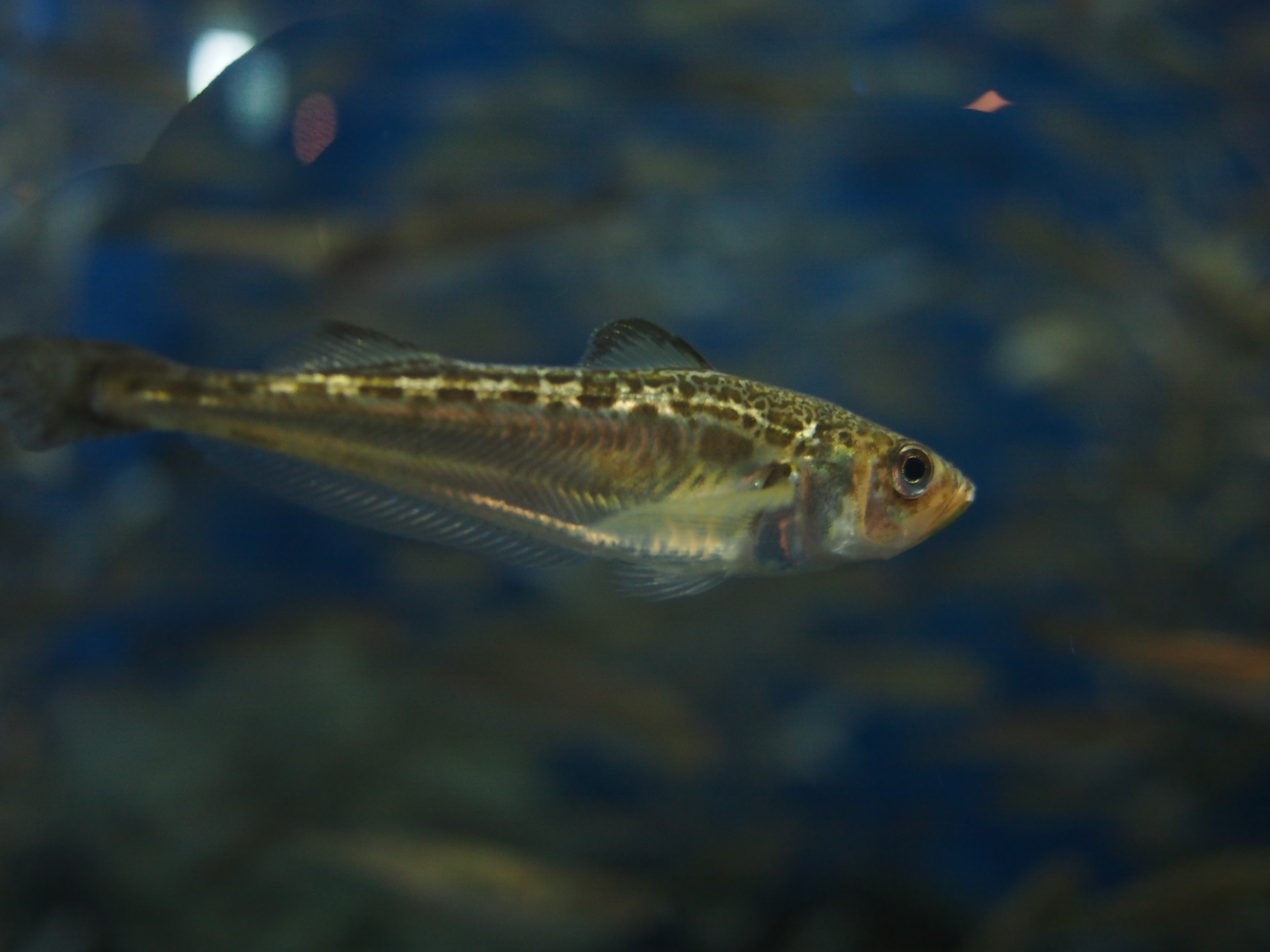
At Oga Aquarium Gao in Akita, Japan

The Japanese sandfish has a life span of 5 years, attaining a typical fork length of 20 centimetres (7.9 in). It is a deep sea fish that usually inhabits sandy and muddy sea floors in waters 200 to 400 metres (660 to 1,310 ft) (550 metres (1,800 ft)) deep, but migrates from November to January to spawn in shallow rocky beds of seaweed. The males reach sexual maturity at 1 1/2 years of age and beyond, and females at the 2-year-old stage; the individuals do not die after single spawning, and have several breeding cycles during their life span.

It preys and feeds on amphipods, copepods, mysidacea, krill, squid, and fish.

=== Distribution ===
The Japanese sandfish is distributed in the northwestern Pacific Ocean, particularly the Sea of Japan to the Okhotsk Sea, Kurile Islands and Kamchatka Peninsula.

Three broad regional population groups had been postulated by Okiyama (1970) based on tagging, and later mitochondrial DNA analysis confirmed these grouping on a genetic basis. The population groups are:

- Western Japan (WJ) – This is a group that migrate the coast of the Sea of Japan from Tottori to Akita Prefecture. It comprises the "northern Sea of Japan" and "western Sea of Japan" subgroups. The spawning grounds of the group has been assumed to be off all along the coast, but bulk spawning grounds are absent around the Noto Peninsula and any further west/south, and in fact, it has been reported that the western Sea of Japan group's spawning grounds occur in the east coast of the Korean peninsula.
- South Hokkaido (SH) – This is a group with breeding grounds in the Pacific Ocean off Hokkaido. It consists of Ishikari Bay, Uchiura Bay, Hidaka, Kushiro, and Nemuro subgroups.
- Eastern Korea (EK) – This group has breeding grounds in the eastern coast of the Korean Peninsula.

Catch production in the Tōhoku region (Northeastern Japan)'s Pacific coast (otherwise known as "Sanriku") is modest, and no regular spawning grounds have been confirmed. Migration routes have not been charted, but their travel range is considered extensive, since individuals from the Hokkaido and Sea of Japan population groups have been captured in the Sanriku shore.

=== External morphology ===
The Japanese sandfish is silvery underneath, and light brown above with dark brown streaks flecked with spots. Tall body depth, though not as tall as the Pacific sandfish (Trichodon trichodon). Head and trunk are scaleless.

A large mouth, oblique and turned upwards, is lined with rows of fine teeth. The gill-flap on the cheek (preopercle) each has five sharp spines. It has a first dorsal and a second dorsal fin that are separated by a gap. The pectoral fins are particularly large. The fish lacks an air-bladder. It is active nocturnally, and during the day time lies buried in the mud or sand on the sea bottom, with only the mouth and eyes (and the spine) visible.

The egg mass (roe) is usually green, but may also have yellow, red, or brown coloration. Pigment components present in the eggs include bilin and carotenoids such as idoxanthin, crustaxanthin, and vitamin A2 aldehyde (3-dehydroretinal). The bilin and retinal produces the base green color, and the amount of relative idoxanthin content is the key determinant of the color variation. Study of its prey (such as the amphipods) or the fish's stomach contents reveal negligible traces of idoxanthin and crustaxanthin, which means the fish must be internally converting other carotenoid substances such as astaxanthin that are abundant in their food into idoxanthin and crustaxanthin, given that fish in general cannot build their own carotenoid wholly out of building block materials. Researchers hypothesize that the intake of astaxanthin influences the idoxanthin concentration in the body, which result in the egg color change.

== Classification ==
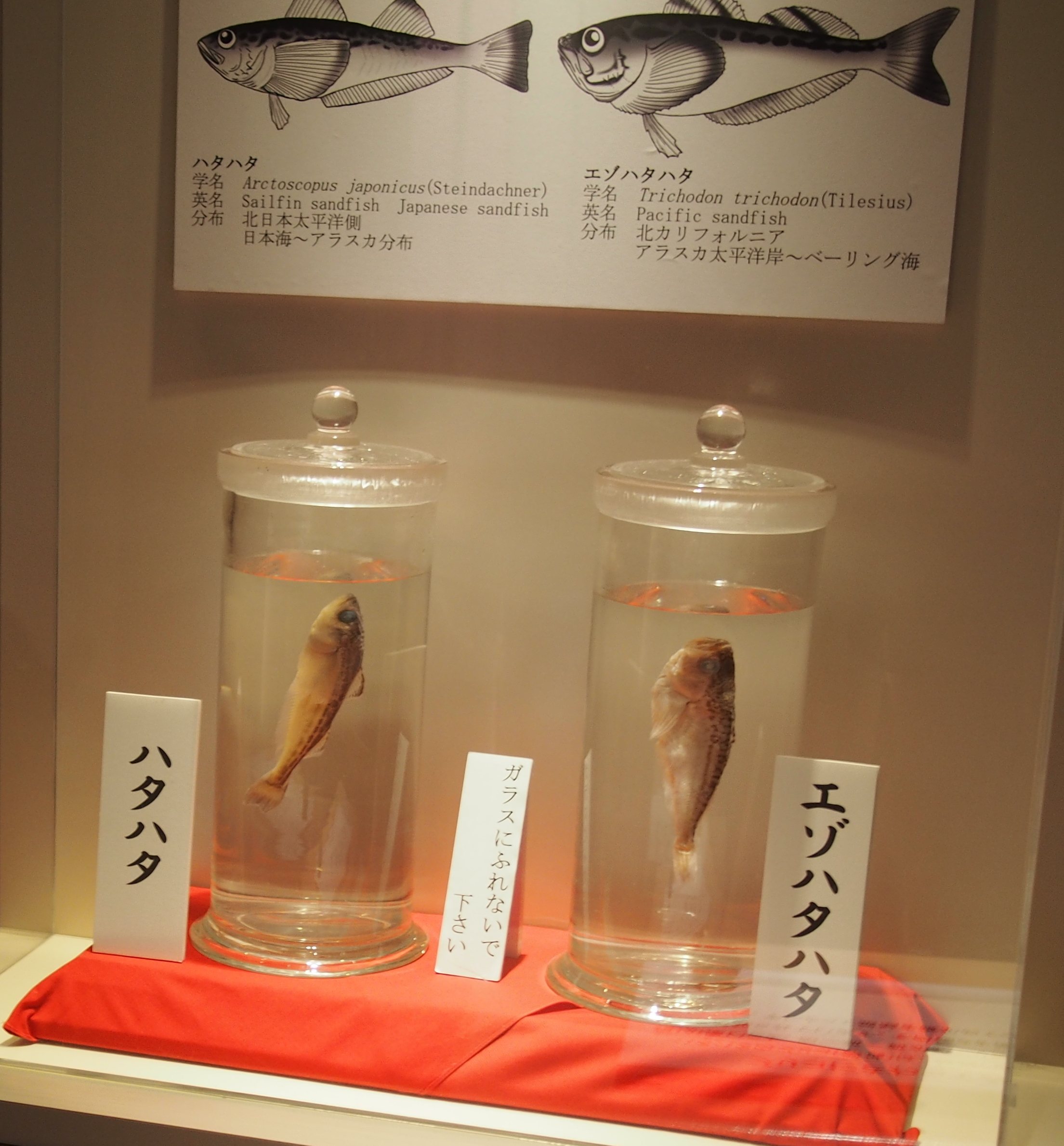
Wet specimens of hatahata (left) and Ezo hatahata (right) at Oga Aquarium Gao

The Japanese sandfish was classified under the Perciformes (perch-likes) order, Trachinoidei suborder, and Trichodontidae (sandfishes) family. However, mitochondrial DNA analysis indicates that the Trichodontidae is classified within the suborder Cottoidei of the Scorpaeniformes order.

=== Similar species ===
- Pacific sandfish, Trichodon trichodon, or ezo hatahata in Japanese, found from the Aleutian Islands to Alaska down to California.

== Nomenclature ==
The Japanese name hatahata may be written as 鰰, which consists of the fish radical 魚 combined with the character kami (神) "god". Ōta Nanpo records the lore that it came to be written this way "because within its scales arises the pattern of Mount Fuji, and was celebrated as auspicious fish," though the actual species has no scales.

An alternate Japanese name is kaminari-uwo (雷魚) "thunder fish", which derives from their spawning (and catching) season coinciding with the months when thunderstorms become frequent. In fact, hatahata is an old onomatopoeia representing the sound of the thunderclap, whose use is attested in the 10th century Kagerō Nikki, and which is the root of the verb hatata-ku "to thunder."

In the Akita dialect, hatahata sounds like hadahada to non-natives, because the "ta" is locally pronounced in voiced unaspirated dakuon, so that hadahada is sometimes listed as a local name for the fish. In Akita, the fish sometimes bears the name "satake uo" after the Satake clan who were rulers of the land around 1600. But the Satakes were originally rooted in Hitachi Province (present-day Ibaraki Prefecture), and legend has it that the fish followed the masters from the old country (Shokusanjin notes that the legend is given in the Akita Suginaoshi monogatari (秋田杉直物語)). (Note: Lowry explains the name stuck after the success of the Satake clan's success at exporting the fish as fertilizer.) In Tottori Prefecture the fish is called shirohata or kitaha. (Note: Lowry gives kihata as do some Japanese source, but kitaha seems to be supported by the majority) (Note: Called shima aji in the vicinity of Nō, Niigata, though this is misleading that term refers to the white trevally in mainstream Japan. (漁村と島 (2004), p.81))

== Fishing practices ==
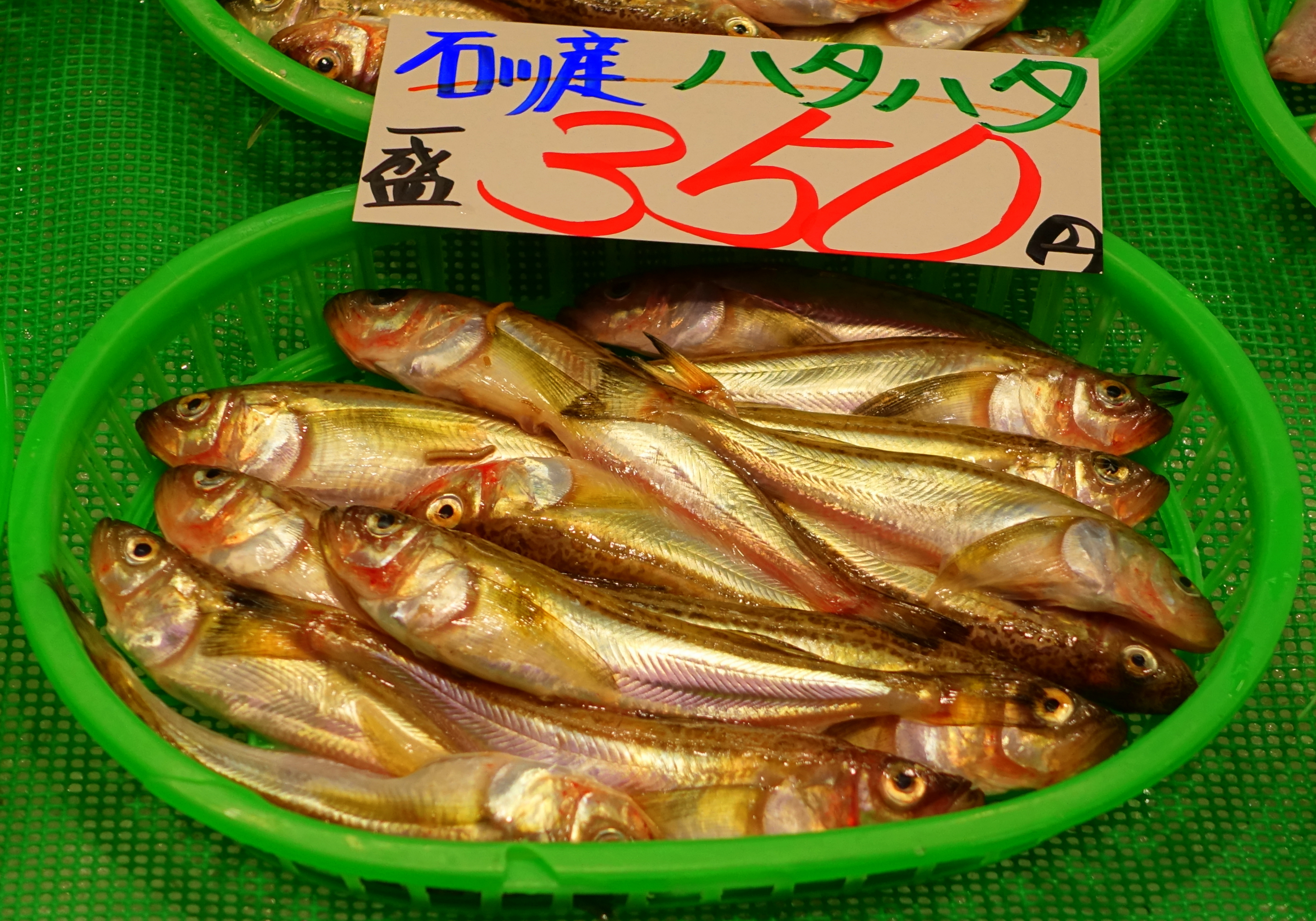
Hatahata being sold in Kanazawa, Japan

The species is caught by bottom trawling offshore and by set-netting and gillnetting the coastal spawning waters. The fish stock down further south are caught by Danish seine fishing.

In Akita Prefecture, each household used to buy them in bulk by the crates (5 or 10 crates at a time) when in season, and the surplus would be preserved as salted fish or as nukazuke to be consumed as a protein source over the winter.

FAO Statistics record that in 1950, the annual catch was 10,000 tonnes (9,800 long tons; 11,000 short tons) accounted solely in Japan, by the beginning of the 1970s Korean fisheries were catching half as much or more in tonnage as the Japanese. The global peak catch occurred in 1971 with 56,700 tonnes (55,800 long tons; 62,500 short tons) total, but by the end of the decade in 1979 there was a sharp collapse in the fish stock resulting in an annual catch of only 11,546 tonnes (11,364 long tons; 12,727 short tons). (Note: Akita Prefecture alone caught 15,000 tonnes (15,000 long tons; 17,000 short tons) per year at its peak.)

In Akita Prefecture, peak catch volume reached 15,000 tonnes (15,000 long tons; 17,000 short tons) per year, but overfishing, possibly with an interplay of water temperature "regime" shifts, led to persisting depletion of stock, so that the fishermen of Akita Prefecture, led by its Fisheries Cooperative Association self-imposed a total moratorium on the catch from 1992 to 1995 In 1999, four participating prefectures formed a fisheries management organization to manage the fish stock, followed in 2003 by a formal Resource Recovery Plan (資源回復計画) for these prefectures. In Korea, the catch was 25,000 tonnes (25,000 long tons; 28,000 short tons) per year in 1971, but suffered a similar decline to 4,000 tonnes (3,900 long tons; 4,400 short tons) by 2008, and that country has also instituted conservation measures.

Tottori prefecture is another area with significant participation in catching this species. Whereas Akita targets egg-carrying adults approach the surface to spawn, Tottori fishing practices capture the deep water migrating populations by bottom trawling, so that the caught fish tends to be fattier, though they do not carry eggs. The catch season for Tottori spans from September to May.

=== Fishing restrictions ===
- In 1999 the Aomori, Akita, Yamagata, and Niigata prefectures instituted restrictions prohibiting capture of fish measuring less than 15 cm (5.9 in).
- Accidents and drownings involving sports fishermen going overboard as well as poaching egg masses (scavenging eggs washed ashore also constitute poaching) has prompted regulations and patrolling efforts by the Fisheries Cooperative Association and police.
  - Foraging, possessing and engaging in sales of egg masses are prohibited (Aomori and Akita)
  - Fishing method restrictions (Aomori, Akita, Yamagata)

== Uses ==
At one time, dried hatahata was one type of fish-based fertilizer (fish manure) being trafficked in Japan. (Note: Statistics for quantities entering the Tokyo Market indicate over 15,000 hyō were shipped in 1903, but none during the other years from 1902 ~ 1911. Each hyō (straw bag) contained 8 ~ 4 shō. 東京商業会議所統計年報. 1924. pp. 34–35.)

=== Food ingredient ===
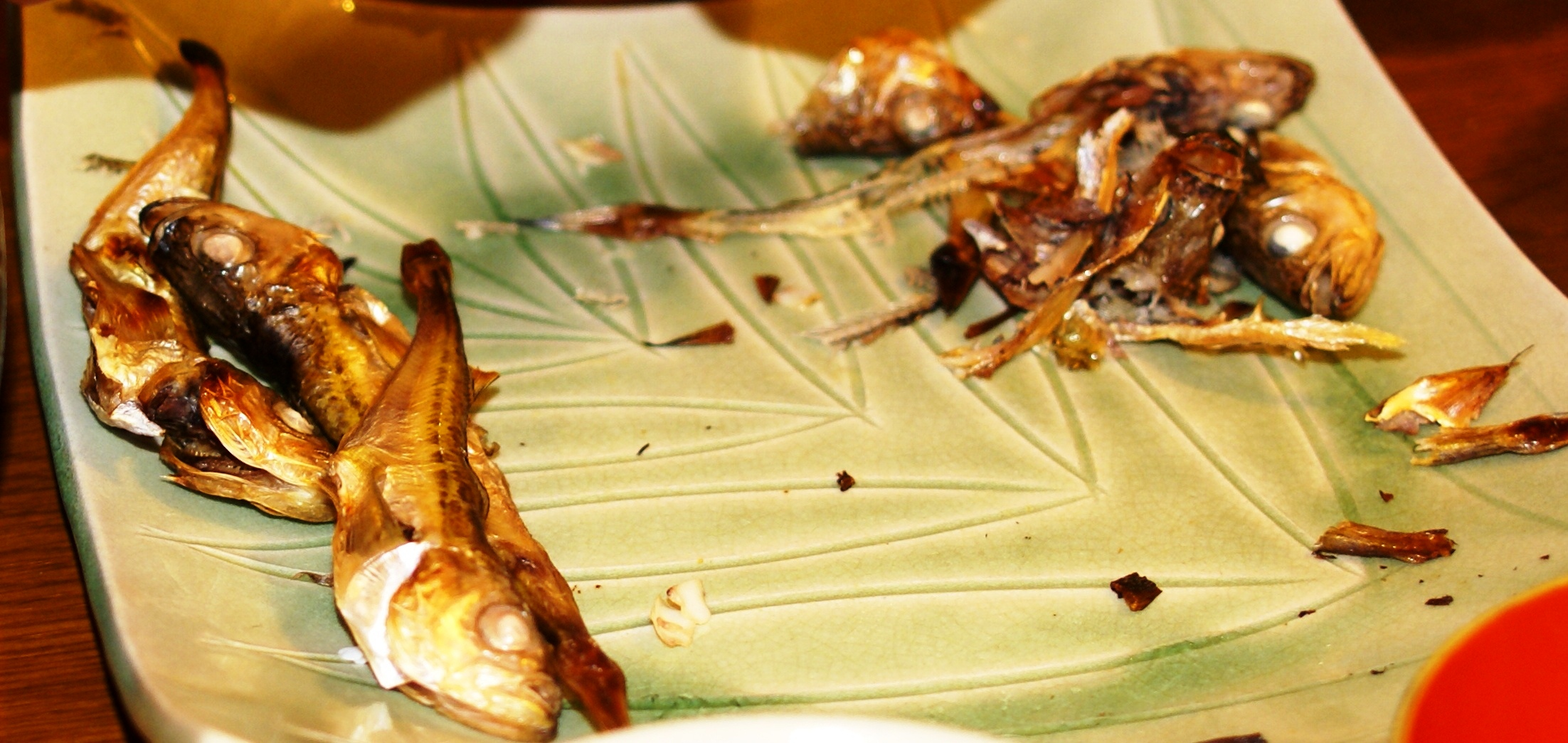
Dried himono or stockfish of hatahata

The fish lacks scale, has few small bones, and the spine separates easily from the flesh, so that they are usually poached or broiled whole, or just with the head off. If the fish is fresh, snapping the bone at the base of the tail beforehand, will make it easier for the spine to come off easily after broiling. Fresh hatahata can be served salted and broiled, or be poached in a pot flavored with soy sauce, sake kasu, and especially shottsuru. In Akita, the pot dish would be flavored with shottsuru, a fish sauce traditionally made by curing the fish in brine.

Another preparation is the dengaku (slathered with sweet miso paste and broiled), which is eaten not only in Akita but also in the Shōnai region around Sakata, Yamagata.

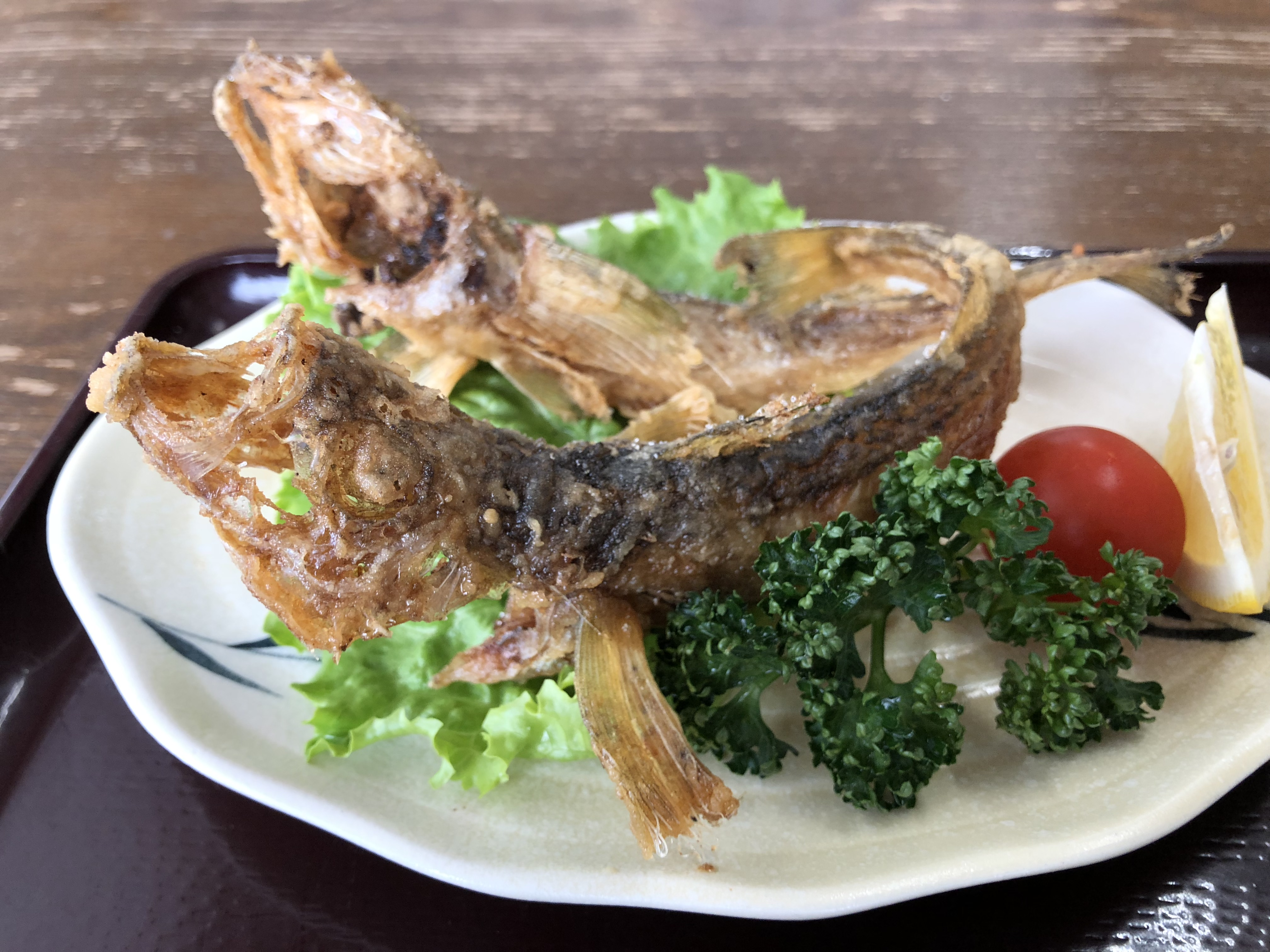
Fried hatahata

The fish is preserved in various ways, such as nukazuke (pickled in rice bran and salt), himono (as dried fish), as mirinboshi, (mirin-based flavored dried fish). It is also made into a preserved narezushi; in Akita the preserving medium consists of rice and koji (Aspergillus oryzae mold for brewing sake) but in Tottori Prefecture the hatahata narezushi is known locally as shirohatazushi and uses okara (soy pulp).

Fresh hatahata is suitable for mizuni or poaching or simmering in water (the dish in Yamagata is called yu-age), and eaten with soy sauce. It can be made into hatahata-jiru (miso soup), but the miso should be dissolved in the broth before the fish is plunged, otherwise the fish falls apart.

In South Korea, the fish (known there as dorumuk (Korean: 도루묵)) is eaten in communities in Gangwon Province and elsewhere along the Sea of Japan. In Korea it is mainly an ingredient for jjigae hot pot dishes, but sometimes the roe-laden females are grilled and eaten.

=== Shottsuru ===
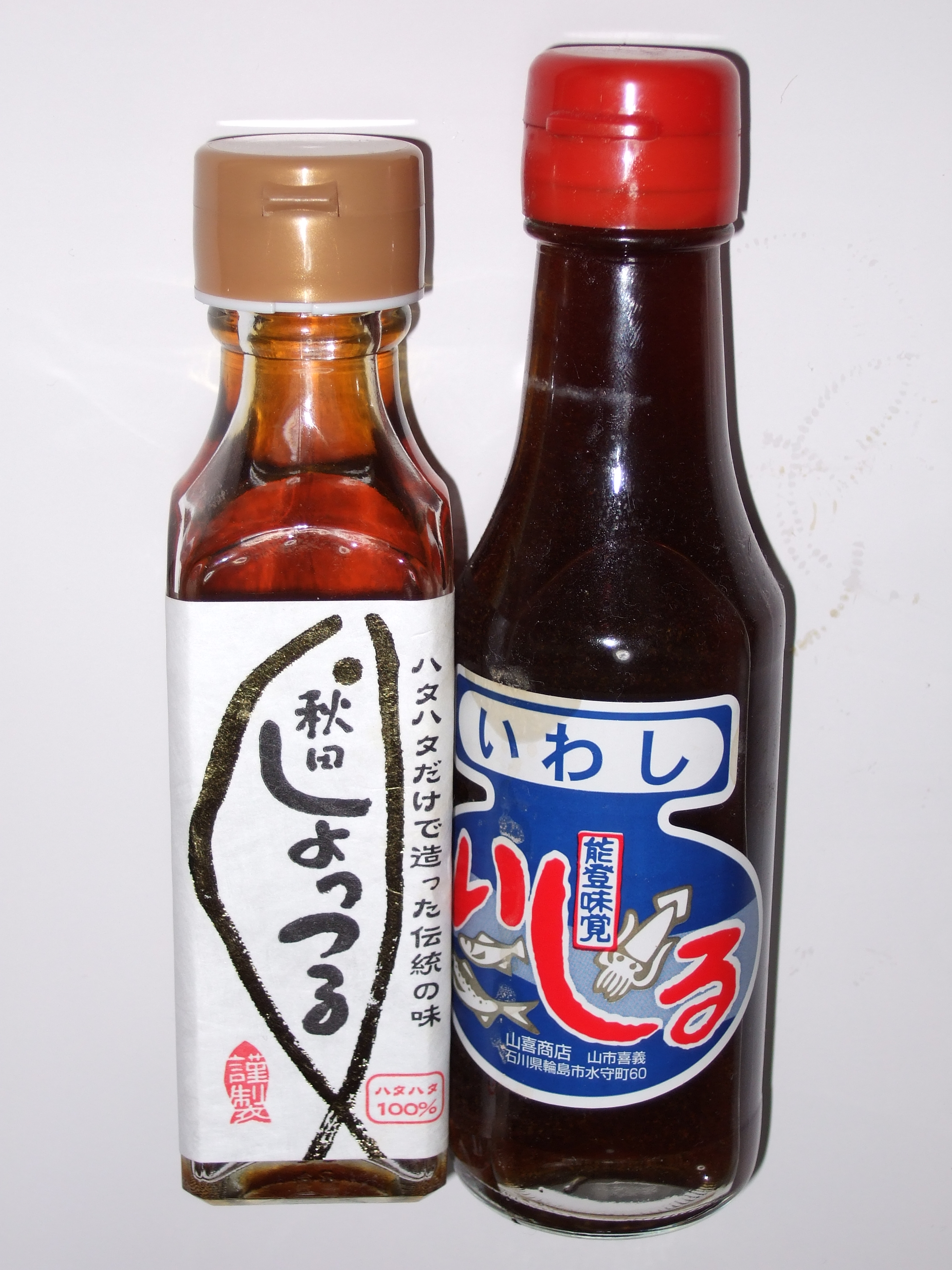
shottsuru

Locally, a fish sauce called shottsuru is made from this fish. The sauce which literally means "salty juice", is made by pickling and fermenting the salted fish, and straining out the debris. The fish sauce is used to flavor the shottsuru nabe, or pot dish that uses this flavoring to cook the hatahata with vegetable and other ingredients. In the Akita dialect, the pot dish also sometimes called shottsuru kayaki, with "kayaki" being the local term for nabe or hot pot dish.

=== Roe ===
In the Akita dialect, the roe of this species is called buriko. The fish is caught during its spawning season, when many of the females are loaded with eggs 2–3 millimetres (0.079–0.118 in) in diameter. The eggs are surrounded by slimy mucus.

Fresh roe that is cooked will burst and make light popping sounds when eaten, but roe from the fish preserved in salt or miso turn rubbery and hard to chew, resulting in a more blunt sound that sounds like buri buri which resulted in its name. (Note: There are alternate etymologies for buriko. One theory is that the mucus-covered eggs bind together and are hard to separate, leading to the name buriko (不離子; "unseparable children"). Another theory proposes that during the Edo period when collecting the eggs was prohibited, a forager evaded an official's interrogation saying they were the eggs of buri (yellowtail).)

The Japanese folk ballad known as Akita Ondo mentions the "Oga buriko" in the lyrics, which is a reference to the roe clusters.

== See also ==
- List of common fish names
