= Shottsuru =

Japanese fish sauce

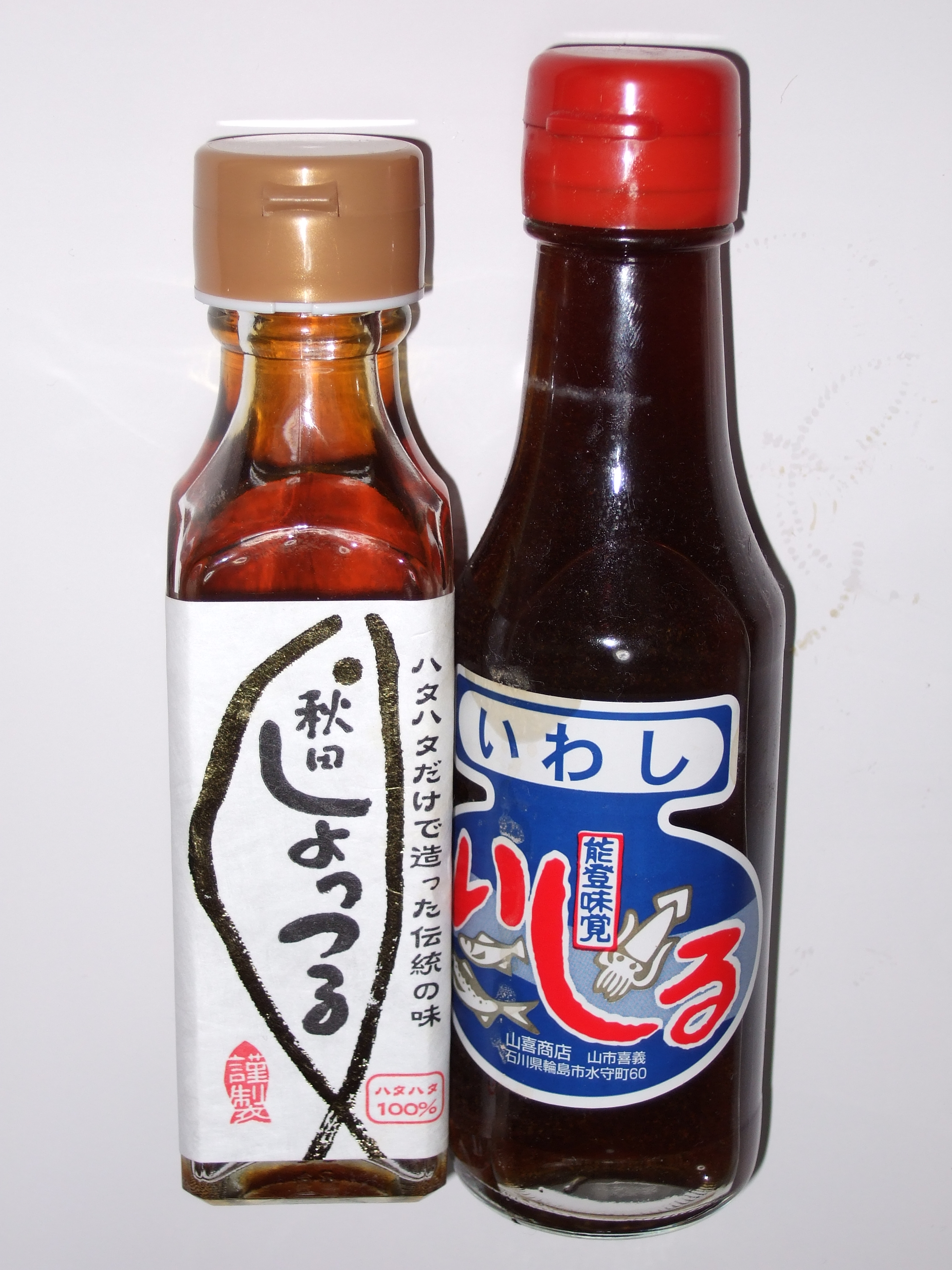
"Akita shottsuru" made from hatahata (left). The other bottle is ishiru made from sardine.

Shottsuru (塩魚汁) is an aromatic regional Japanese fish sauce similar to the Thai nam pla. The authentic version is made from the fish known as hatahata (Arctoscopus japonicus or sailfin sandfish), and its production is associated with the Akita region.

== See also ==
- List of fish sauces
