= Diaphantes =

Diaphantes Temporal range: Middle Miocene

Scientific classification
- Kingdom: Animalia
- Phylum: Chordata
- Class: Actinopterygii
- Order: Perciformes
- Suborder: Cottoidei
- Family: Trichodontidae
- Genus: †Diaphantes; Nazarkin & Voskoboinikova, 2000
- Species: †D. tilesii

Binomial name
- †Diaphantes tilesii Nazarkin & Voskoboinikova, 2000

Extinct genus of ray-finned fish

Diaphantes is an extinct genus of marine ray-finned fish belonging to the family Trichodontidae, the sandfishes. Its only species, D. tilesii, was found in the Middle Miocene-aged Agnevo Formation of Sakhalin in the northwestern Pacific Ocean.
