= Fish sauce =

Condiment made from fish

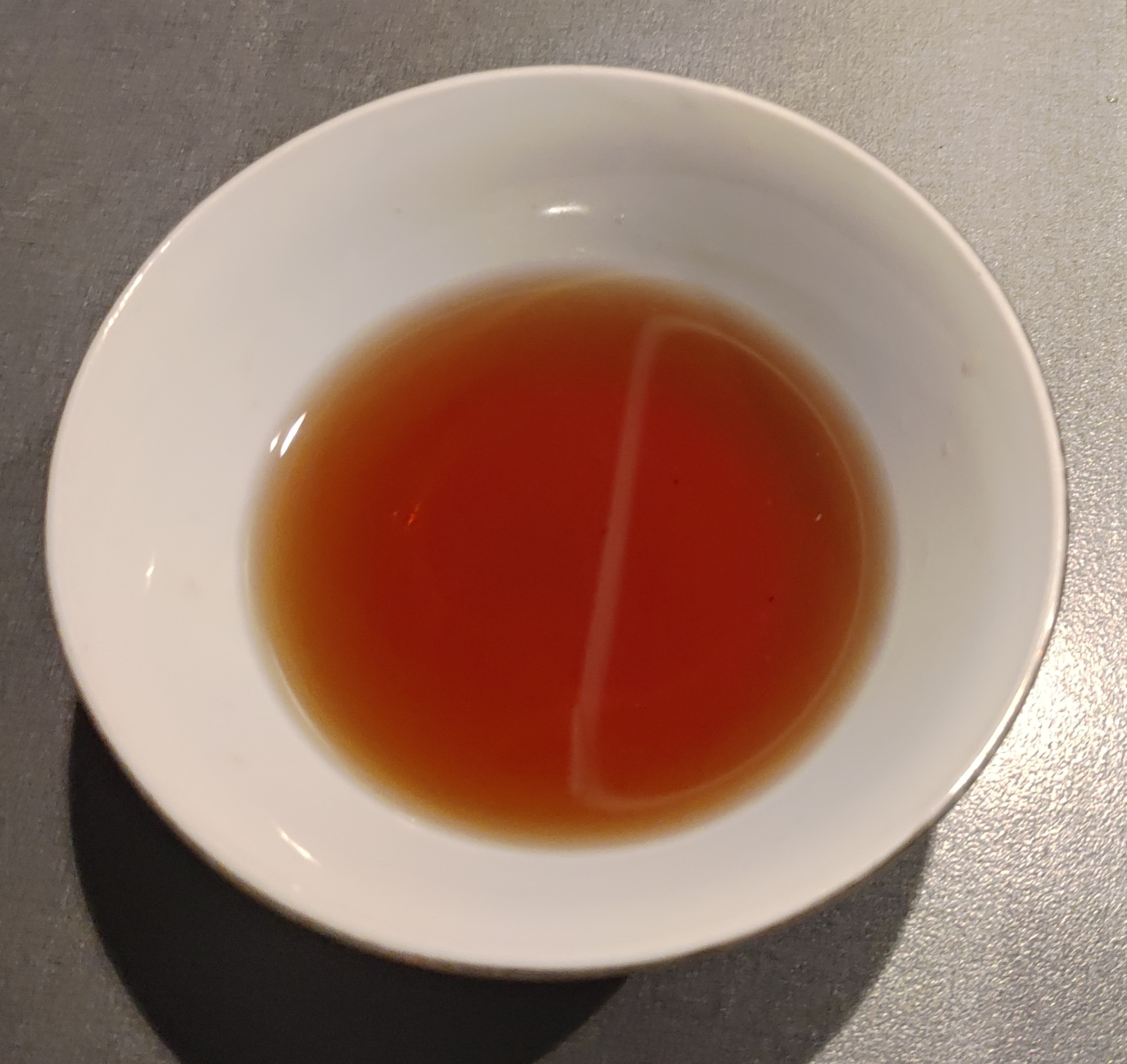
- Type: Condiment
- Place of origin: Various places
- Region or state: Southeast Asia and East Asia
- Associated cuisine: Burmese, Cambodian, Chinese, Lao, Filipino, Thai, and Vietnamese
- Main ingredients: Fish, salt

Fish sauce

Chinese name
- Traditional Chinese: 魚露
- Simplified Chinese: 鱼露
Transcriptions
Standard Mandarin
- Hanyu Pinyin: yúlù
- Wade–Giles: yü^{2}-lu^{4}
Yue: Cantonese
- Jyutping: jyu4lou6
Southern Min
- Teochew Peng'im: he5 lou7

Alternative Chinese name
- Traditional Chinese: 蝦油
- Simplified Chinese: 虾油
Transcriptions
Southern Min
- Hokkien POJ: hê-iû (Min Dong, Hokkien)

Second alternative Chinese name
- Traditional Chinese: 魚水
- Simplified Chinese: 鱼水
Transcriptions
Yue: Cantonese
- Jyutping: jyu4 seoi2 (Guangzhou Cantonese, Vietnam, Cambodia)

Burmese name
- Burmese: ငါးငံပြာရည် (ngan bya yay)

Vietnamese name
- Vietnamese alphabet: nước mắm
- Chữ Nôm: 渃𩻐

Thai name
- Thai: น้ำปลา
- RTGS: nam pla

Korean name
- Hangul: 어장
- Hanja: 魚醬
Transcriptions
- Revised Romanization: eojang

Japanese name
- Kanji: 魚醤
- Kana: ぎょしょう
- Kyūjitai: 魚醬
Transcriptions
- Romanization: gyoshō

Malay name
- Malay: kicap ikan, sos ikan

Indonesian name
- Indonesian: kecap ikan

Filipino name
- Tagalog: patis

Lao name
- Lao: ນ້ຳປາ (nam pā)

Khmer name
- Khmer: ទឹកត្រី (tɨk trəy)

Fish sauce is a liquid condiment made from fish or krill that have been coated in salt and fermented for up to two years. It is used as a staple seasoning in East Asian cuisine and Southeast Asian cuisine, particularly Myanmar, Cambodia, Laos, the Philippines, Thailand, and Vietnam. Some garum-related fish sauces have been used in the West since the Roman times.

Due to its ability to add a savory umami flavor to dishes, it has been embraced globally by chefs and home cooks. The umami flavor in fish sauce is due to its glutamate content.

Fish sauce is used as a seasoning during or after cooking, and as a base in dipping sauces. Soy sauce is regarded by some in the West as a vegetarian alternative to fish sauce though they are very different in flavor.

== History ==
=== Asia ===
Sauces that included fermented fish parts with other ingredients such as meat and soybean were recorded in China, 2300 years ago. During the Zhou dynasty of ancient China, fish fermented with soybeans and salt was used as a condiment. By the time of the Han dynasty, soybeans were fermented without the fish into soy paste and its by-product soy sauce, with fermented fish-based sauces developing separately into fish sauce. A fish sauce, called kôechiap (Chinese: 膎汁) in Hokkien Chinese, might be the precursor of ketchup. This word survives in the Malay kecap or kicap, both terms on their own however semantically narrowed in usual parlance to mean "soy sauce" (e.g. kecap manis lit. 'sweet kicap') whereas the fish liquid still in use today has been termed as kicap ikan i.e. "fish kicap".

By 50–100 BC, demand for fish sauces and fish pastes in China had fallen drastically, with fermented bean products becoming a major trade commodity. Fish sauce, however, developed massive popularity in Southeast Asia. Food scholars traditionally divide East Asia into two distinct condiment regions, separated by a bean-fish divide: Southeast Asia using fermented fish (Vietnam, Thailand, Cambodia), and Northeast Asia using fermented beans (China, Korea, Japan). Fish sauce re-entered China in the 17th and 18th centuries, brought from Vietnam and Cambodia by Chinese traders up the coast of the southern provinces, Guangdong and Fujian.

=== Europe ===
Fish sauces were widely used in ancient Mediterranean cuisine. The earliest recorded production was between 4th–3rd century BC by the Ancient Greeks, who fermented scraps of fish called garos into one.It is believed to have been made with a lower salt content than modern fish sauces.

The Romans made a similar condiment called either garum or liquamen. According to Pliny the Elder, "garum consists of the guts of fish and other parts that would otherwise be considered refuse so that garum is really the liquor from putrefaction." Garum was made in the Roman outposts of Spain almost exclusively from mackerel by salting the scrap fish innards, and then sun fermenting the flesh until it fell apart, usually for several months. The brown liquid would then be strained, bottled, and sold as a condiment. Remains of Roman fish salting facilities can still be seen, including in Algeciras in Spain and near Setúbal in Portugal. The process lasted until the 16th century when garum makers switched to anchovy and removed the innards.

Garum was ubiquitous in Classical Roman cooking. Mixed with wine it was known as oenogarum, or with vinegar, oxygarum, or mixed with honey, meligarum. Garum was one of the trade specialties in Hispania Baetica. Garum was frequently maligned as smelling bad or rotten, being called, for example, "evil-smelling fish sauce" and is said to be similar to modern colatura di alici, a fish sauce used in Neapolitan cuisine.

In English garum was formerly translated as fish pickle. The original Worcestershire sauce is a related product because it is fermented and contains anchovies.

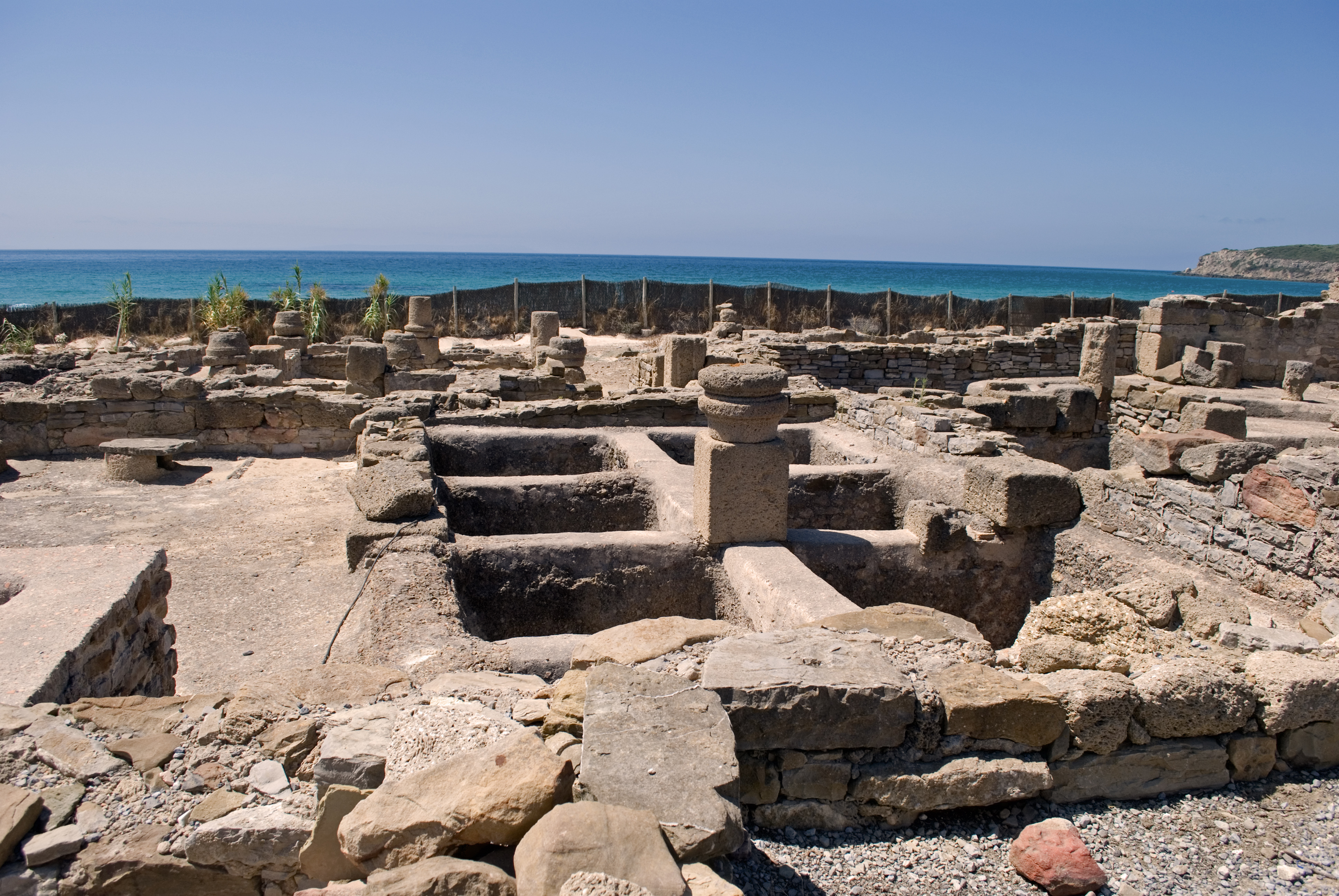
Ruins of a Roman garum factory near Tarifa, Spain

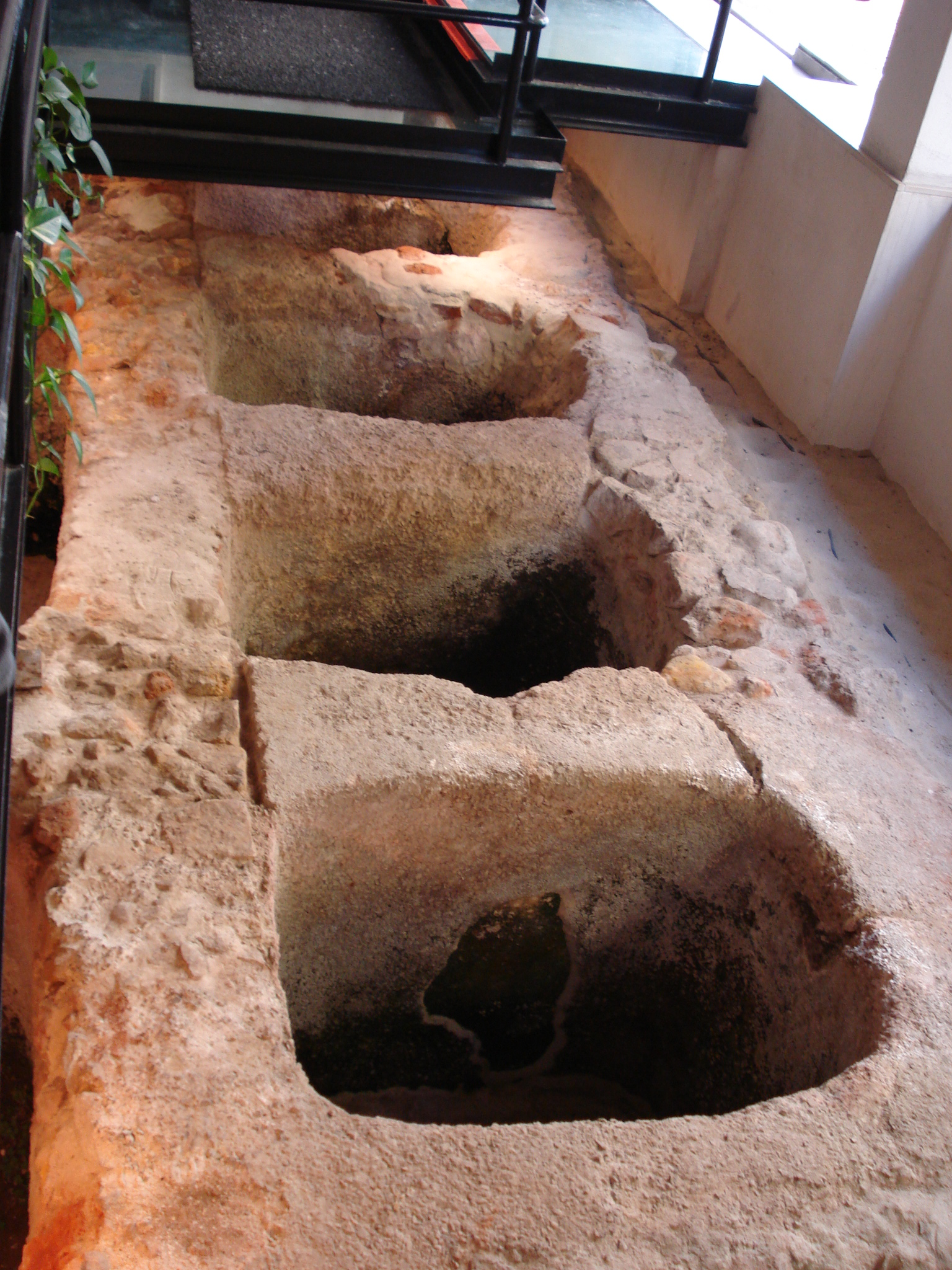
Ancient Roman garum factory in Portugal

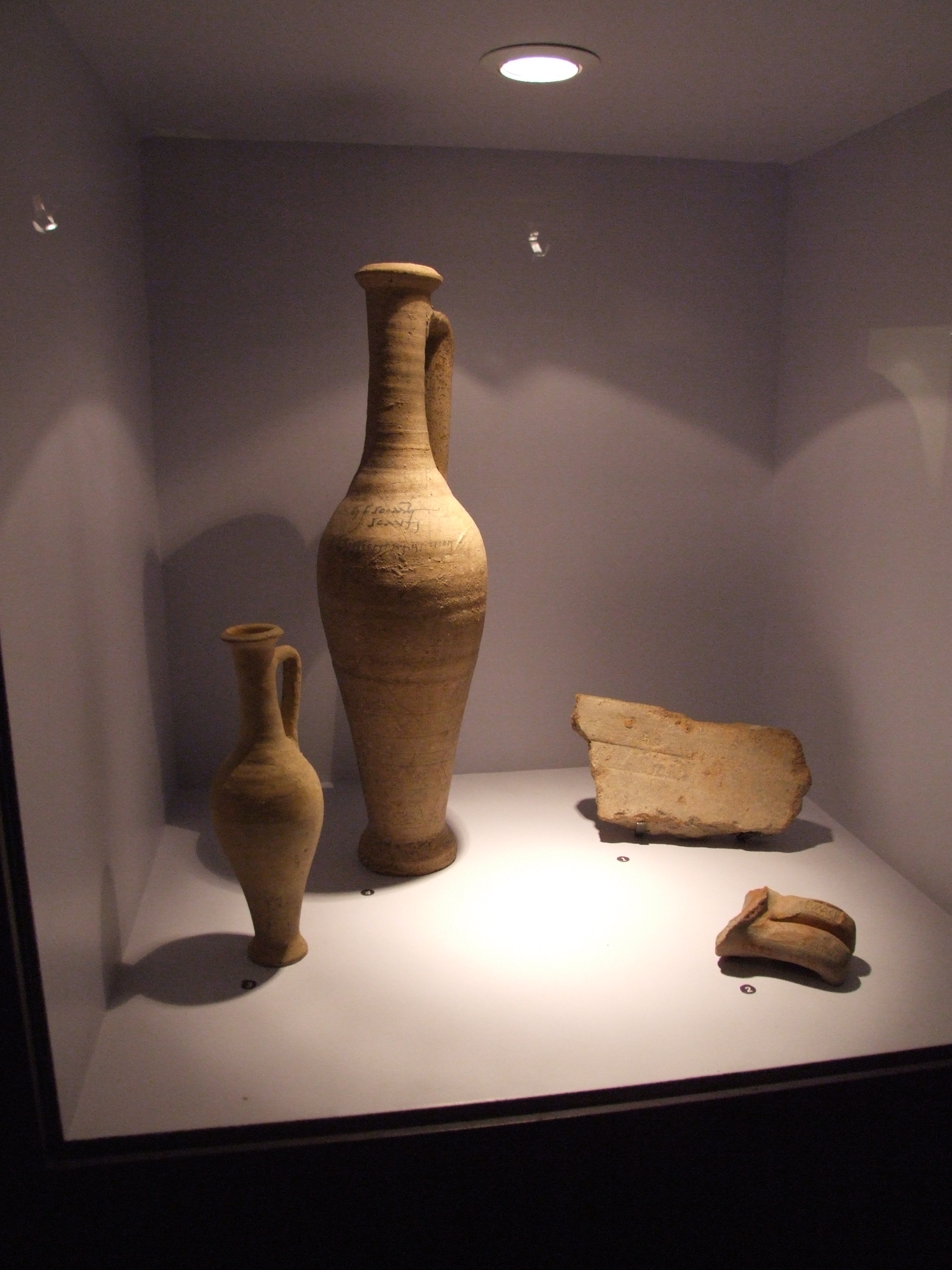
Two amphoras for garum

== Difference from oyster sauce ==
While fish sauce and oyster sauce are both briny and may have related histories, they are different products. Fish sauce is watery, clear, and salty, whereas oyster sauce is made by reducing oyster extracts and therefore sweeter with a hint of salt and not as strong an aroma as fish sauce.

== Ingredients and manufacture ==
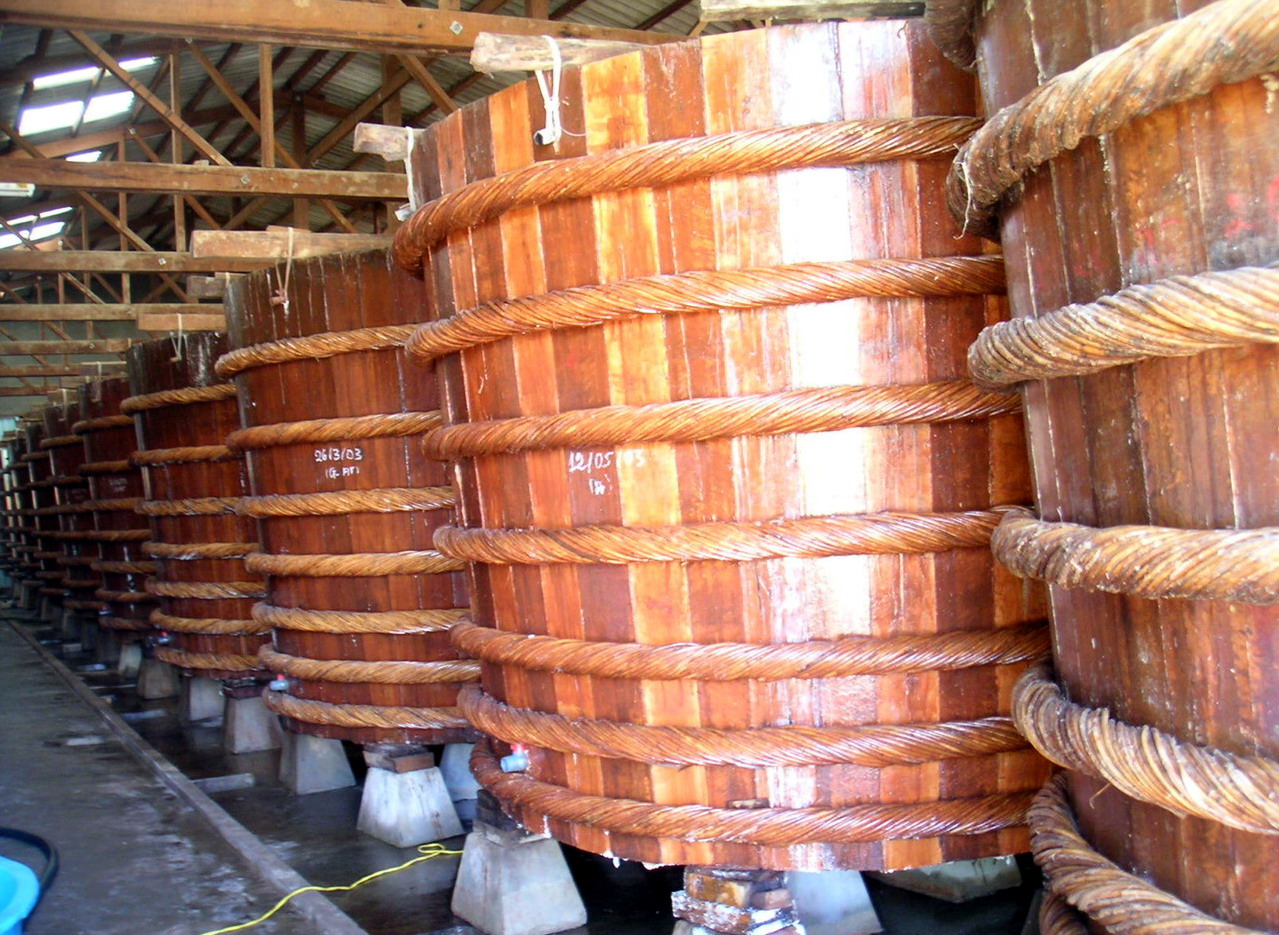
Fish sauce fermentation containers in Phú Quốc, Vietnam

Fish sauces historically have been prepared from different species of fish and shellfish, and from using the whole fish, or by using just fish blood or viscera. Most modern fish sauces contain only fish and salt, usually made from anchovy, shrimp, mackerel, or other strong-flavored, high oil fish. Some variants add herbs and spices. For modern fish sauces, fish or shellfish are mixed with salt at a concentration of 10% to 30%. It is then sealed in a closed container for up to two years.

Once the original draft has been made, some fish sauces will be produced through a re-extraction of the fish mass via boiling. To improve the visual appearance and add taste, second-pass fish sauces often have added caramel, molasses, or roasted rice. They are thinner, and less costly. Some volume manufacturers of fish sauce will also water down a first-press to manufacture more products.

Fish sauce that has been only briefly fermented has a pronounced fishy taste. Extended fermentation reduces this and gives the product a nuttier, richer and more savory flavor. An anonymous article, "Neuc-num", in Diderot and d'Alembert's 18th-century Encyclopédie, states: "It is said that Europeans become accustomed enough to this type of sauce".

== Regional variations ==
=== Southeast Asia ===
Fish sauce is a fundamental condiment and flavoring widely used in Southeast Asian cuisines. Thai and Cambodian fish sauces are generally milder and less pungent compared to their Vietnamese counterparts.

==== Myanmar ====
Fish sauce in Myanmar is called ngan bya yay (ငါးငံပြာရည်). It's often a by-product of Hmyin ngapi (မျှင်ငပိ) (Burmese fish paste made from small fish, anchovies, krill and shrimp).

==== Cambodia ====
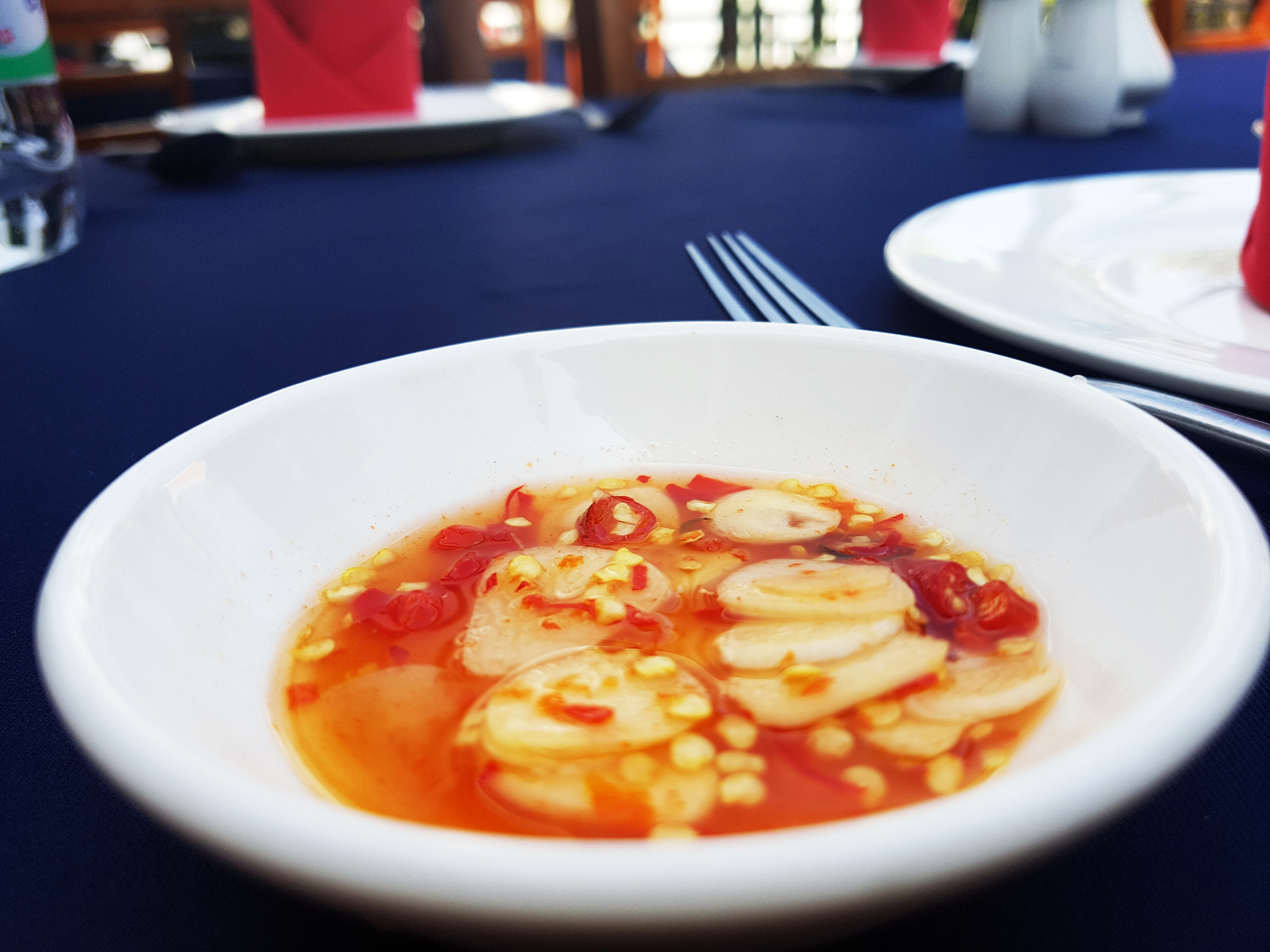
Cambodian sweet fish sauce mixed with chopped chili peppers and slices of garlic

In Cambodia, fish sauce is called tik trei (Khmer: ទឹកត្រី, tœ̆k trei). Just like prahok, it is believed to date back to the pre-Angkorean era. Industrially fish sauce is produced by mixing trei aing keuy or anchovies with coarse salt and fermenting it in large wooden vats. Over the period of six to eight months, it is distilled five times, before being transferred into jars and sun-fermented for the final 2–3 months. The most famous fish sauce is produced in the Kampot Province. Food Production Company of Kampot produces a speciality fish sauce containing roe. Fish sauce is mixed with sugar, lime juice, chili peppers and crushed roasted peanuts to create sweet fish sauce, which is the most popular dipping sauce in Cambodia.

==== Laos ====
In Lao/Isan, it is called nam pa (Lao: ນ້ໍາປາ). A chunkier, more aromatic version known as padaek is also used.

==== Philippines ====
The Philippine fish sauce is known as patis. It is one of the most important ingredients in Filipino cuisine. Patis is a by-product of bagoong, which include bagoong isda (fermented fish) and bagoong alamang (fermented krill), as well as the rarer bagoong macabebe (fermented oysters) and bagoong sisi (fermented clams). The fish used are typically small like sardines, anchovies, ambassids, and the fry of larger fish. Unlike other fish sauce variants, the fermented solids are not discarded but are sold as separate products. The patis is skimmed from the upper layers of fermenting bagoong and is not pressed. As such, patis usually takes longer to produce than other types of fish sauce as it is reliant on the readiness of bagoong.

Patis is nearly always cooked prior to consumption, even when used as an accent to salads or other raw dishes. It is also used as an ingredient in cooked dishes, including a rice porridge called arroz caldo, as a condiment for fried fish or an umami accent in a common dish, sinigang. Patis is also used in place of table salt in meals to enhance the flavor of the food, where it can either be dashed from a dispensing bottle onto the food, or poured into a saucer and mixed with calamansi and labuyo chilis as a dipping sauce.

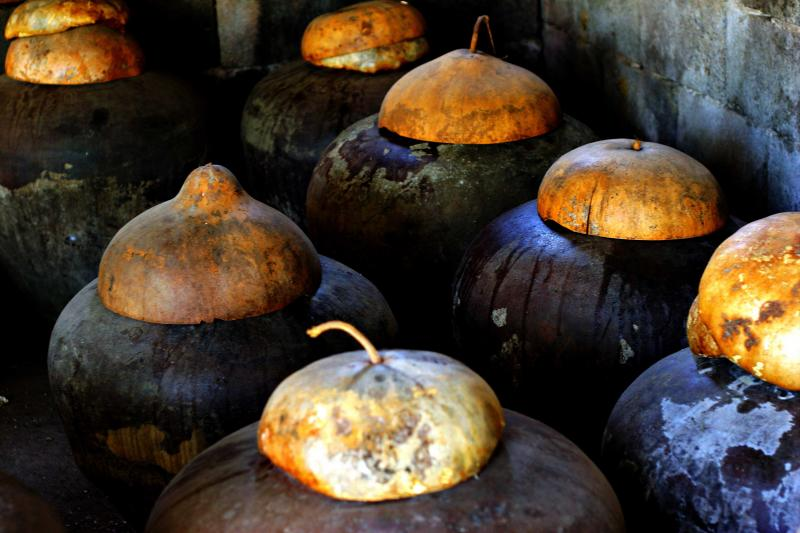
Traditional burnay jars containing fermenting bagoong in Ilocos Norte

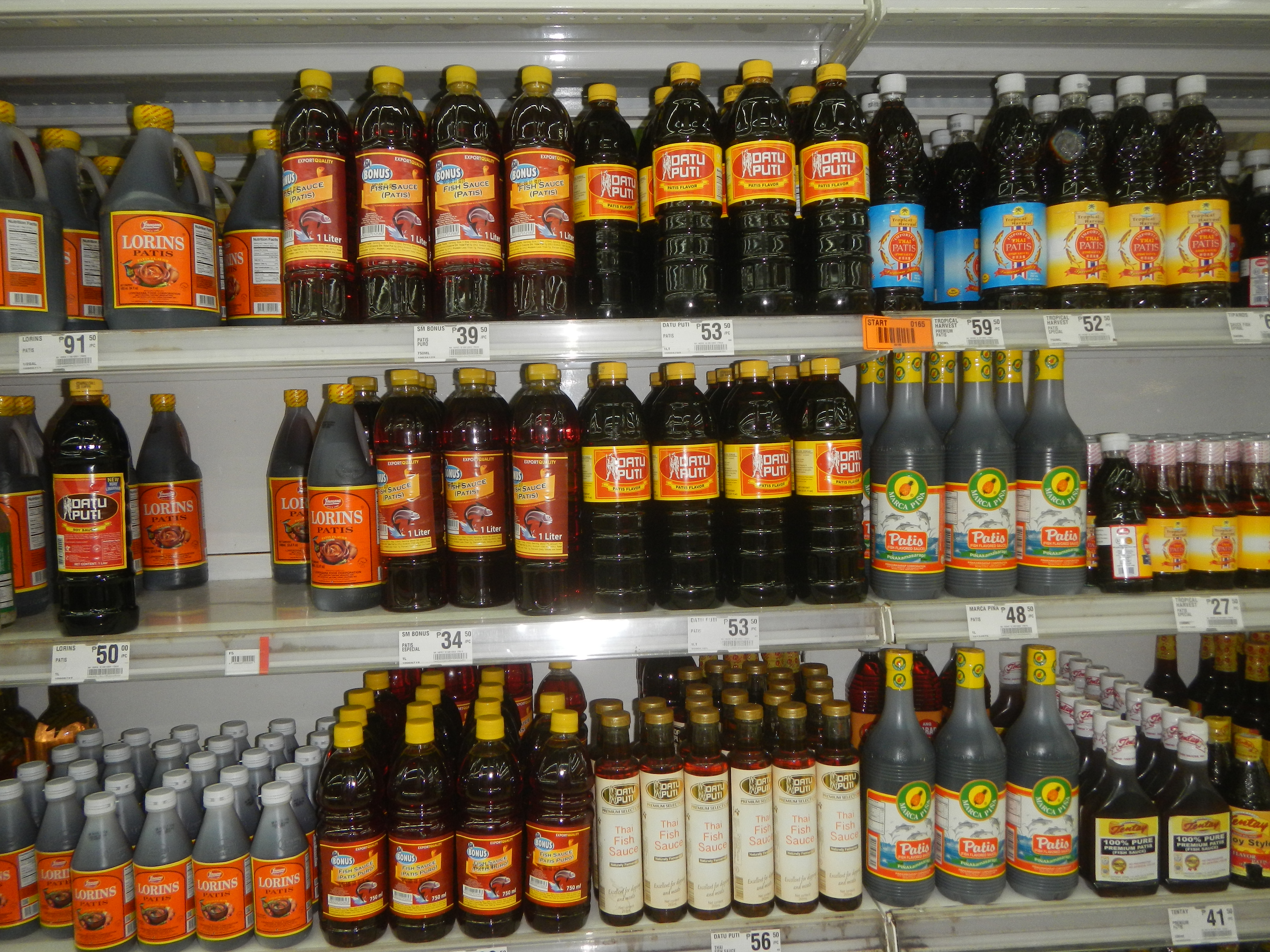
Commercial patis sold in the Philippines

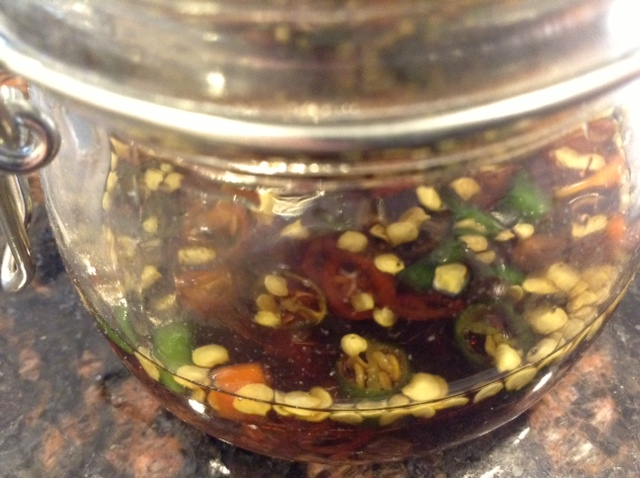
Dipping sauce made from patis with siling labuyo peppers

==== Thailand ====
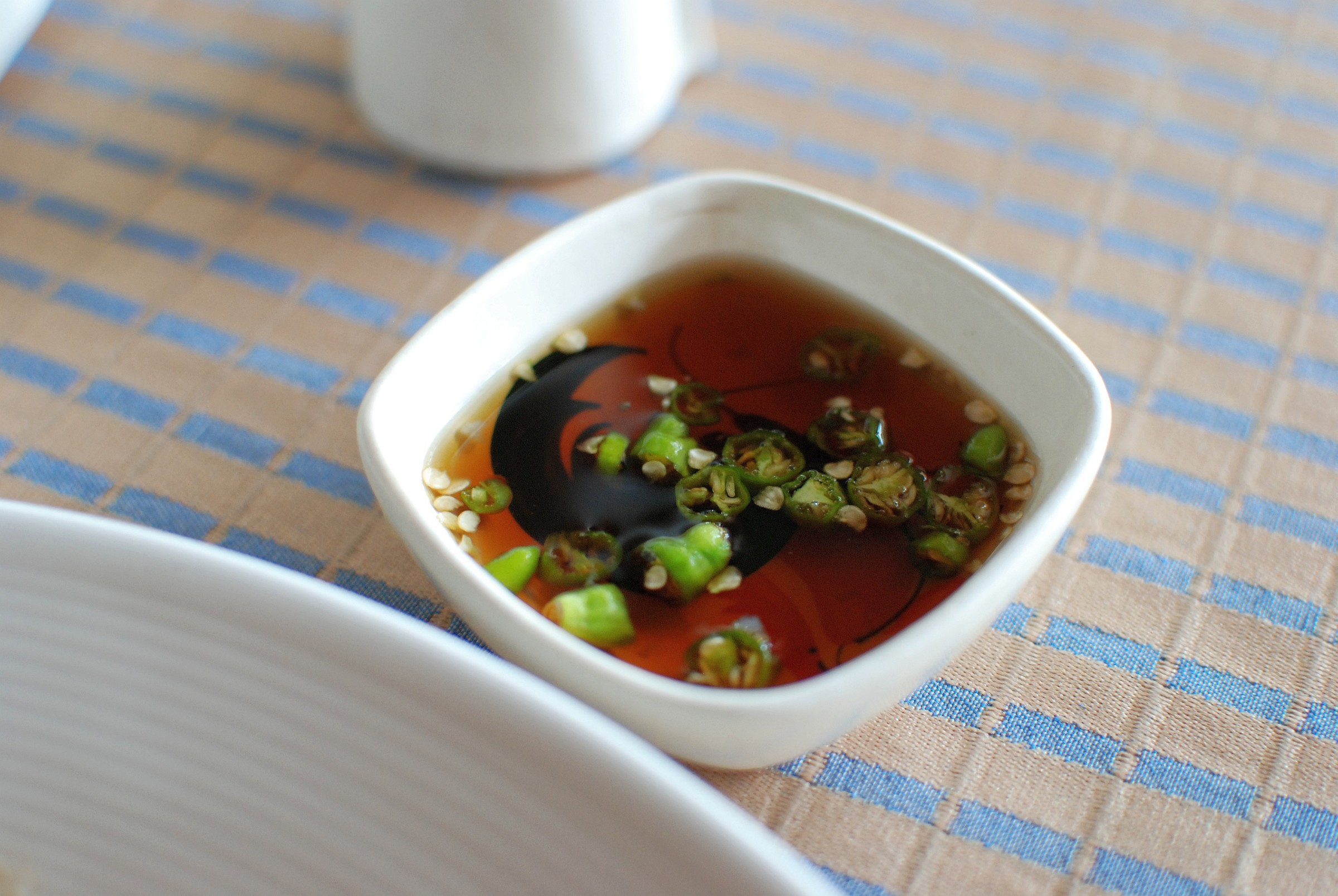
Phrik nam pla ("fish sauce with chili") is served with some Thai meals

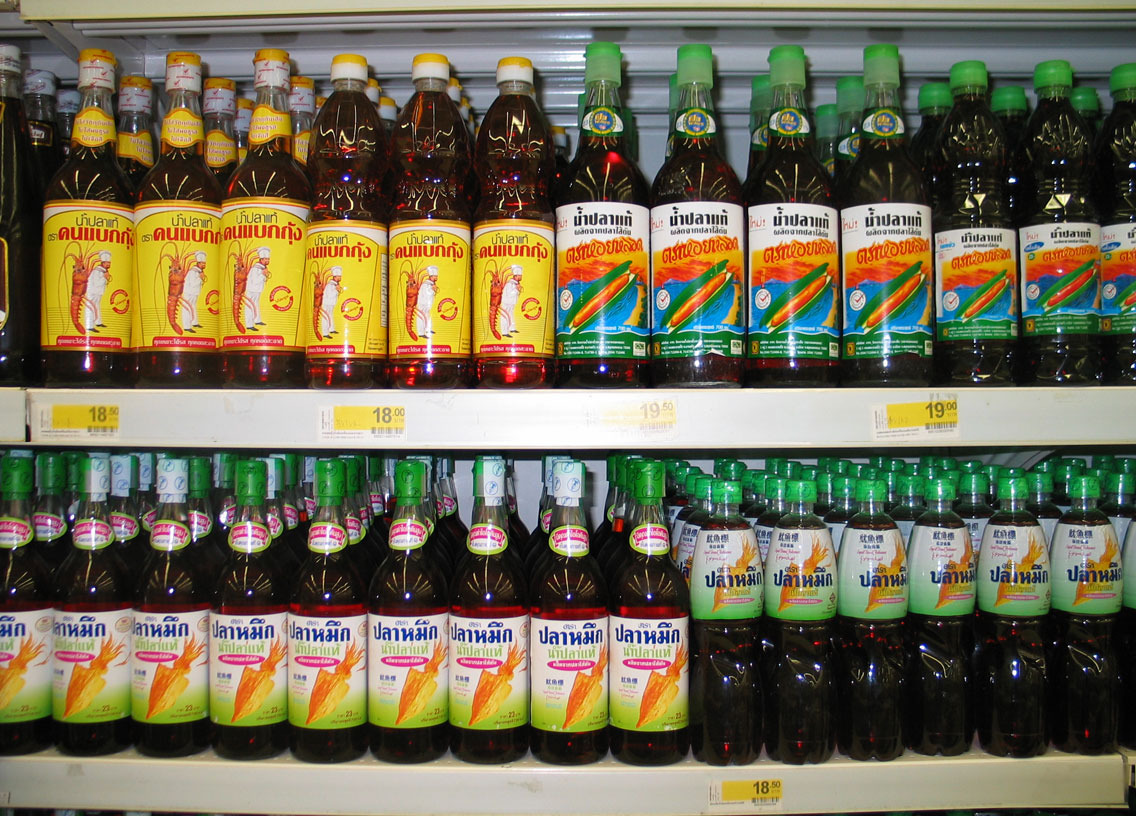
Prepared fish sauces in Thailand

Fish sauce in Thailand is called Nam pla (Thai: น้ำปลา). In Isan, it is called nam pa. Similar to the Laotian padaek is pla ra (Thai: ปลาร้า), also used in Thai cuisine. In Thailand, fish sauce is used both in cooking and also served at the table as a condiment, for instance in noodle soups. Nearly every Thai meal is served with phrik nam pla as a condiment: a mixture of fish sauce, lime juice, and chopped bird's eye chilies. Sliced garlic is often added to this sauce.

Historically, there were two types of fish sauce made in Thailand: that made from freshwater fish, pla soi, and that made from saltwater fish, pla kratak. Either fish is fermented for at least eight months, three parts fish to two parts salt. The resulting mash is filtered. This yields the best fish sauce called the "base". The dregs are then mixed with water and salt and again fermented for three to four months. This yields a second-grade fish sauce, mostly used in cooking.

In 2014, the US Food and Drug Administration (FDA) banned the import of Thai fish sauces due to a lack of information about tests for botulinum toxin. The toxin can cause death if more than 0.5 micrograms are consumed. The Thai Office of Food Safety and Quality then tested 48 brands of fish sauce to determine the content of botulinum toxin in the products. Of 48 brands tested, 28 were genuine fish sauces from 18 production sites in 12 provinces. Twenty samples from production sites in eight provinces were adulterated fish sauce. Tests showed that none were contaminated with botulinum toxin types A, B, E, and F and were free of Clostridium botulinum bacteria. In 2018, rumours again surfaced concerning banned Thai fish sauce.

==== Vietnam ====
The variety from Vietnam is called nước mắm. There are two areas in Vietnam that are most famous for producing fish sauce: Phú Quốc and Phan Thiết.

Fish sauce has a 300-year history dating back to the Champa kingdom of the Cham people. Phan Thiết can be identified with the birthplace of Vietnamese fish sauce. Before 1693, Phan Thiết was a territory of Champa. The Vietnamese occupied the area in 1693 and commercialized the fish sauce by keeping it in barrels and selling throughout the country. This business was popularized by Trần Gia Hòa who was born in 1872. There is a fish sauce museum in Phan Thiết. Popular brands in the US include Mega Chef, Red Boat, 3 Crabs, Golden Boy, and Hòn Phan Thiết.

Vietnamese fish sauces are made with anchovies, mackerel, scabbard fish, and salt. High mercury concentration can be found in larger fish, especially in predator fish like scabbard fish. They do not have any additives like sugar, hydrolyzed protein, or preservatives. Vietnamese prefer sauces without a strong smell, and transparent with a deep golden amber color. "First press" fish sauce, meaning the sauce is bottled from the first time the fermenting barrels are drained, also indicates quality. Lastly, when measuring the nitrogen level of fish sauces (°N, or grams of nitrogen per liter), most fish sauce on the market falls within the mid 20°N range. Anything over 30°N is considered high-grade, and 40°N is optimal.

Nước chấm is a Vietnamese prepared fish-based condiment (also referred to as a "sauce") that is savory, lightly sweet and salty tasting, and can be sour and spicy if lime and chili peppers are added. The main components are fish sauce, water, and sugar.

Mắm is made much like fish sauce, except that it is not fermented as long, and the fish is kept along with its liquid extract, not just the extract. Mắm can be used as a base condiment in dipping sauces with additional ingredients, used in soups, stir-fries and meat loaves, or eaten with rice as a main dish.

In January 2016, the Institute of Food Technologists published a study asserting that using Vietnamese fish sauce as a substitute for sodium chloride (salt) in chicken broth, tomato sauce, and coconut curry reduced the amount of sodium chloride by 10 to 25 percent while still maintaining the perceived deliciousness, saltiness, and overall flavor intensity. This idea is similar to the use of umami flavor enhancers such as MSG to increase flavor intensity and reduce sodium requirement.

According to the General Statistics Office, in 2020, the output of fish sauce reached nearly 380 million liters. According to the Vietnam Fish Sauce Association, the output of fish sauce in 2023 is expected to reach about 420 million liters. The reason for this growth is due to the increasing domestic demand and the strong development of the fish sauce export industry. Vietnamese fish sauce is currently exported to more than 60 countries and territories around the world. According to statistics, Vietnam currently has 783 fish sauce production facilities with 1,500 participating farming households, producing about 250 million liters of fish sauce per year. Of which, 35 facilities produce fish sauce for export to 20 markets.

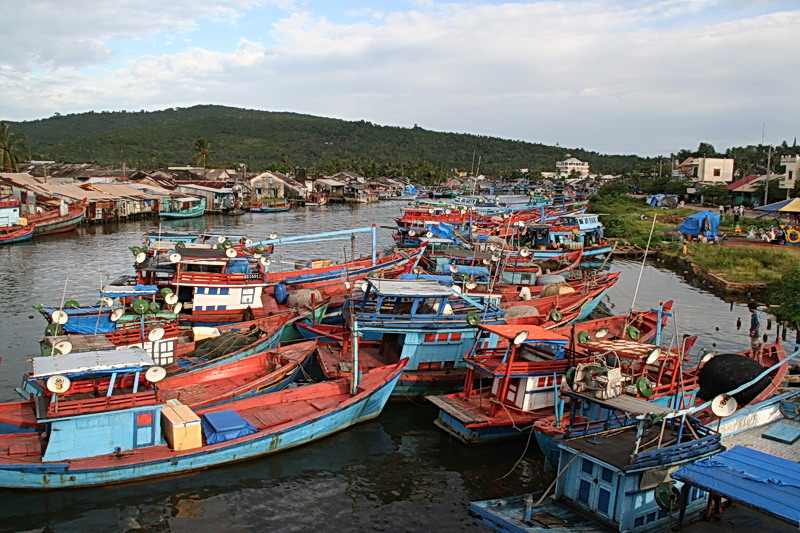
Fishing boats in Phú Quốc, where the most prized fish sauce is made

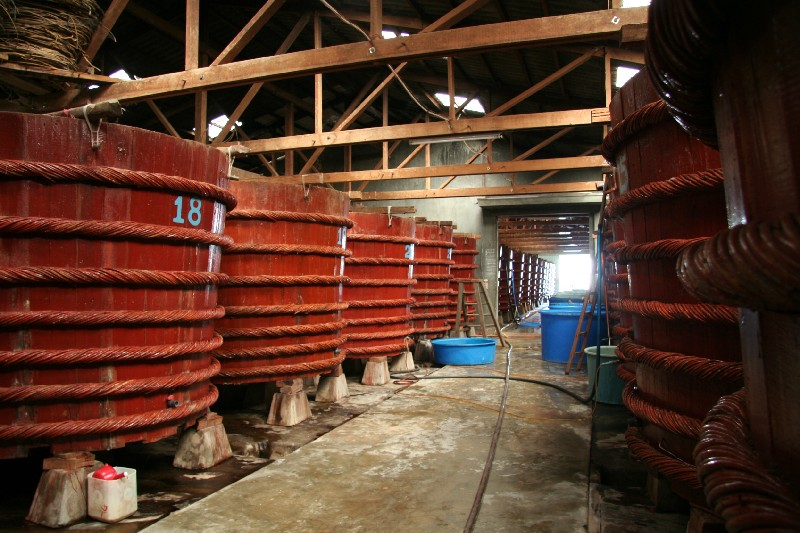
A fish sauce factory in Phú Quốc

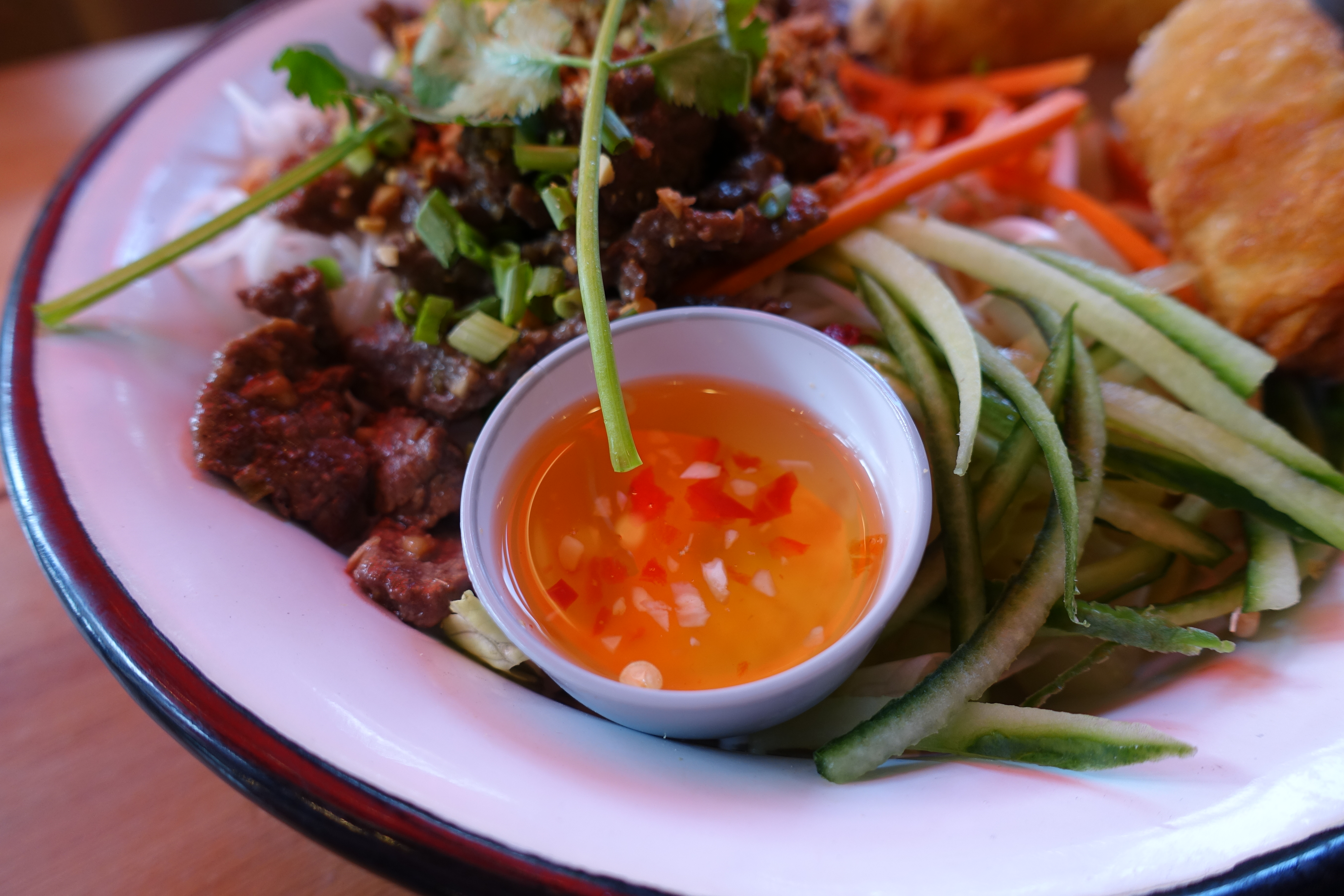
A small bowl of nước chấm (literally meaning, dipping water)

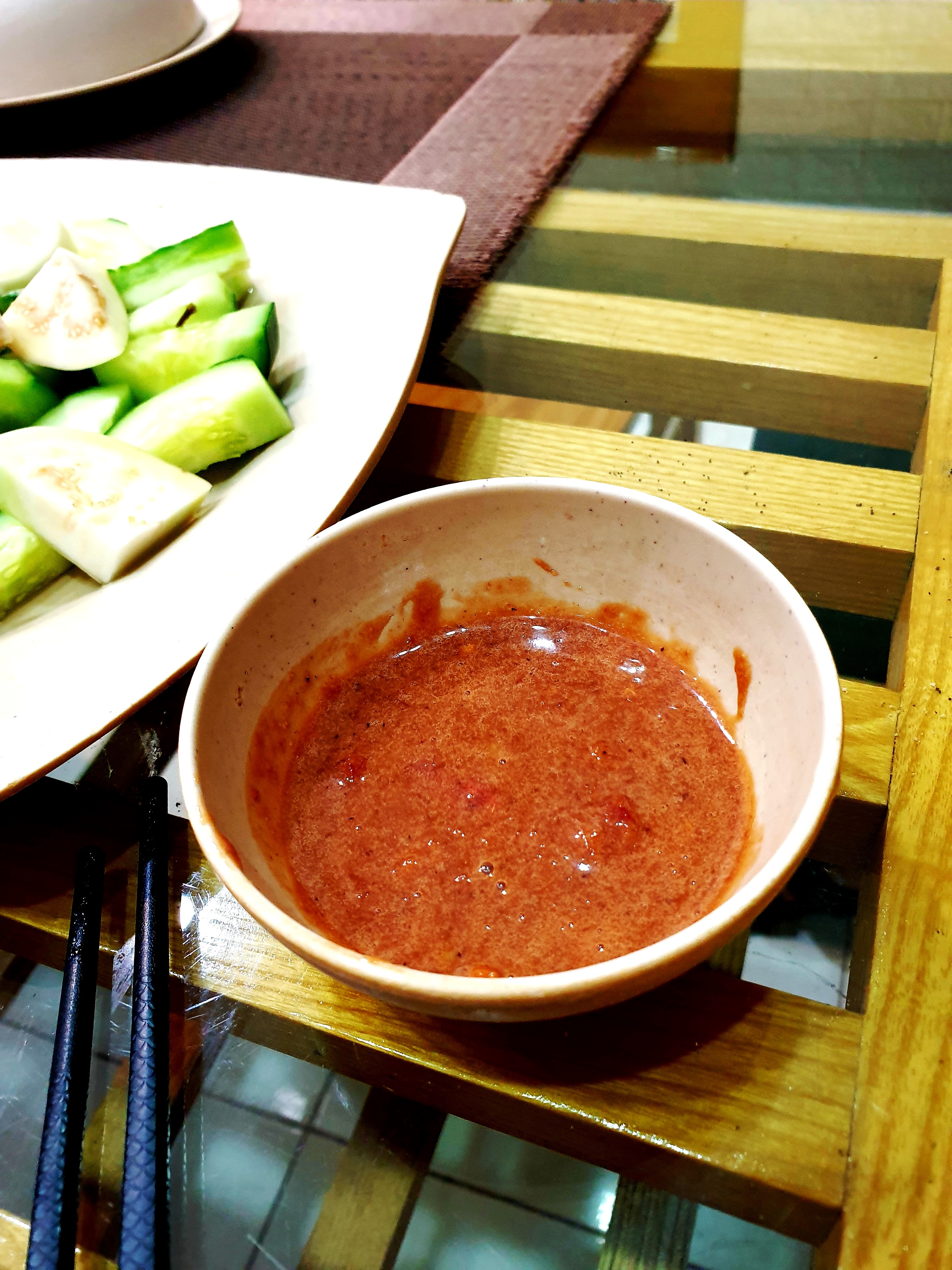
A bowl of mắm nêm

=== East Asia ===
==== China ====
In China, fish sauce is called yúlù (simplified Chinese: 鱼露; traditional Chinese: 魚露; pinyin: yúlù, literally "fish dew") and is native to the provinces of Guangdong and Fujian. In Chaoshan cuisine, fish sauce is made with Reeve's shad (Tenualosa reevesii), which is unsuitable for direct eating due to being fatty, bony, and odorous.

==== Japan ====
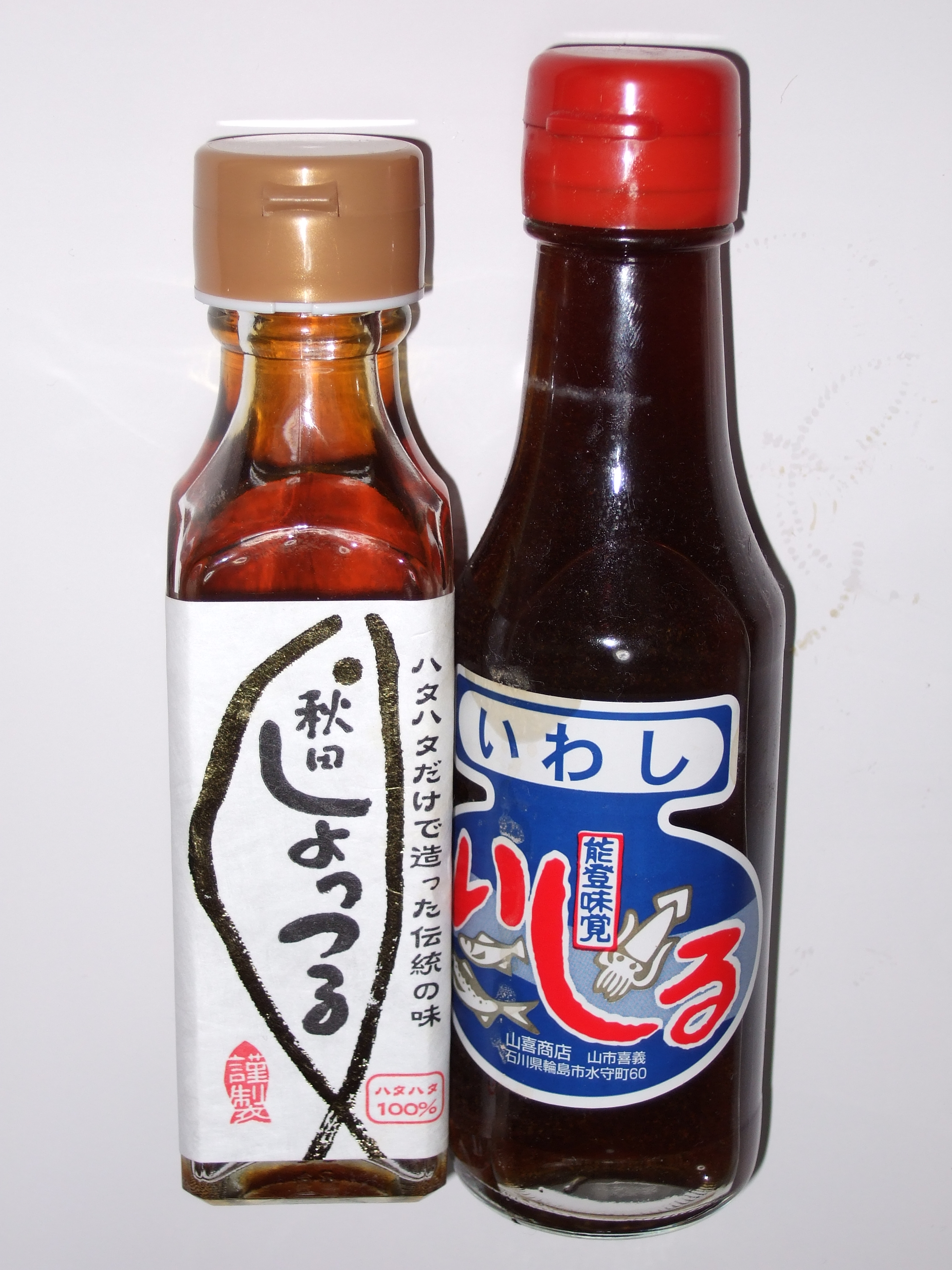
Japanese fish sauces shottsuru and ishiru

In Japan, fish sauce is called gyoshō (魚醤); another name is uoshōyu (魚醤油). There are several variations used in regional cuisines. Ishiru in the Noto Peninsula is made from sardine and squid. Shottsuru, the best-known type of Japanese fish sauce and often used as a synonym for all gyoshō, is from Akita Prefecture and is mainly made from sailfin sandfish. Ikanago shoyu of Kagawa Prefecture is made from sand lance. They are used in nabemono, in salad dressings, and as a flavoring ingredient in ramen soups. Imported Thai / Vietnamese fish sauce in Japan is referred to as nanpurā (ナンプラー), from the Thai word for fish sauce nam pla.

==== Korea ====
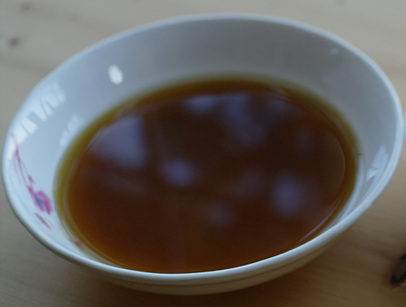
Myeolchi-aekjeot (anchovy sauce)

In Korea, fish sauce is called eojang (어장). Across the Korean Peninsula, aekjeot (액젓, literally "liquid jeotgal"), a type of fish sauce usually made from fermented anchovies or kkanari (sand lances), is used as a crucial ingredient in many types of kimchi, both for taste and fermentation. In Jeju Island, eoganjang (어간장), made of fermented godori (young chub mackerel) or horse mackerel, is used in place of soy sauce.

=== Europe ===
Colatura di alici is an Italian fish sauce originating in the village of Cetara, Campania. Worcestershire sauce contains fermented anchovies among other ingredients, which is common in the Anglosphere countries.

== Nutrition contents ==
Common commercial brands of fish sauce generally contain about 50% to 60% of the FDA's daily recommended amount of sodium per tablespoon serving. Most commercial brands of reasonable quality contain one or two grams of protein per serving; however, higher-quality brands may have four grams of protein or more, while lower-quality brands may have less than one gram of protein per serving. Fish sauce has an insignificant amount of carbohydrates and fats. Vitamin B12, vitamin B-6, and magnesium are present in small amounts.

== See also ==
- Budu
- List of Chinese sauces
- List of dips
- List of fish sauces
- Prahok
- Shrimp paste
