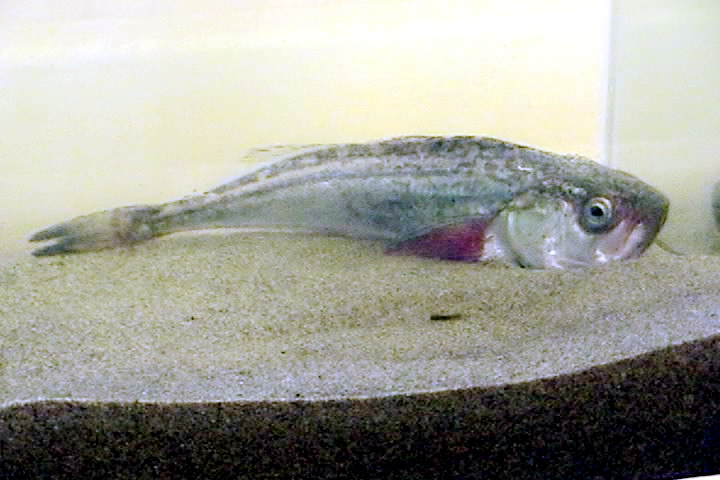
- Pacific sandfish in an aquarium at the Oregon Institute of Marine Biology in Charleston, Oregon

Scientific classification
- Domain: Eukaryota
- Kingdom: Animalia
- Phylum: Chordata
- Class: Actinopterygii
- Order: Perciformes
- Suborder: Cottoidei
- Family: Trichodontidae
- Genus: Trichodon (Tilesius, 1813)
- Species: T. trichodon

Binomial name
- Trichodon trichodon Tilesius, 1813

Synonyms
- Trachinus trichodon Tilesius, 1813; Trachinus gasteropelecus Tilesius, 1813; Trichodon stelleri Cuvier, 1829; Trichodon lineatus Ayres, 1860

= Pacific sandfish =

Species of fish

The Pacific sandfish (Trichodon trichodon) is a species of sandfish native to the Pacific coast of North America, from San Francisco Bay to Unimak Island in the Aleutian Islands. Like its cousin the sailfin or Japanese sandfish (Arctoscopus japonicus), the Pacific sandfish is a small, deepwater fish distributed over sandy and muddy depths. It is not valued for sushi like its Japanese cousin, but is occasionally caught from piers by recreational anglers.

== Description and life cycle ==
Pacific sandfish are small, reaching a maximum length of 12 inches (30 cm) and a weight of 12 oz (340 g). They have a long, slender body, with a silvery belly and a darker top side with black spots. The fish's fins and tail are long and thin, with a scaleless body. The Pacific sandfish is found over muddy and sandy bottoms to depths of 1,230 feet (370 m). Females lay a clutch of about 1000 eggs during the spawning months in winter. After a one-year incubation, the eggs hatch 0.5 inches (13 mm) larvae. Sandfish larvae are excellent swimmers, swimming freely in open nearshore water, sometimes in the company of juvenile salmon. These schoolings of sandfish and salmon are considered beneficial to the former since the latter swarm in schools and give protection from predators to the normally solitary sandfish. Sandfish and salmon smolt are also considered to have the same diet, which is another theory for these schoolings.

At 2–3 months and 2.5 inches(50–60 mm) in length, they have attained the laterally compressed adult form, and bury themselves in the seabed. The Pacific sandfish is known to live a maximum of 9 years; females grow larger than males.

Adult sandfish are only known to inhabit sandy shores along beaches, whereas the egg masses are usually laid near rocky shores where they can be attached to rocks and seaweed easier. The larvae must begin swimming and schooling immediately after birth because they have a high metabolism and must eat almost constantly. The sandfish has a synchronized hatching method that ultimately prevents the eggs from getting beaten or destroyed by the waves. The eggs are laid and hatched at the lowest tides of the year to avoid the powerful storms. The baby fish begin to look like their parents at 25 days of age, when their mouth becomes upturned and their fins become bigger, like their parents'. At fifty-six days, they bury in the sand; this is when they truly begin to look like sandfish. Finally, at seventy days, they are considered to be full grown.

== Diet ==
Pacific sandfish are mostly shrimp eaters, feeding by waiting for small fish, shrimp or krill to come into range and then sucking the prey up with its unusually large upturned mouth. The sandfish's teeth are needle-sharp for grasping prey. Most shrimp eaten are between 1 and 3 inches long. The sandfish waits for prey by burying itself in sand or mud and using is upturned eyes to watch passing prey. Sandfish themselves are preyed upon by Pacific cod and Pacific halibut. Seabirds such as pigeon guillemots, gulls, and puffins will also prey on sandfishes.

== Fishery ==
Although they are occasionally taken and retained by recreational anglers, Pacific sandfish are of no commercial value.

== See also ==
- Japanese sandfish
