= Himono =

Japanese culinary method

- Type: Dried and salted fish
- Place of origin: Japan
- Main ingredients: Fish, salt

Himono is a Japanese culinary method of preparing dried and salted fish. The term literally translates to dried fish. The method generally involves taking either the whole fish or slicing it length-wise, soaking it in brine, and then drying it overnight.

Himono is made with smaller varieties of fish, including Pacific saury, sardines, and horse mackarel. It is usually served during breakfast or a late dinner with rice and soy sauce.

== History ==
Himono is the traditional method of preparing dried fish in Japan. Before the use of modern refrigeration, storage, and logistical technology, this method of preparing and preserving dried fish was popular in the country.

Archaeological evidence found in the fossils of dried fish and mollusks suggests that the himono method of fish preservation was practiced as early as the Jomon period (14500 - 300 BCE). It became a popular delicacy among the royalty and nobility during the Nara period (710-794 CE) and the Heian period (794–1185), becoming part of the imperial diet at the court of Kyoto.

Over the next few centuries, in particular during the Edo period (1603–1868), as the general population's standard of living improved, the affluent inland civilians began consuming himono as a luxury cuisine item. Fish dried and prepared in the coastal towns was sold in Edo and other inland towns where people embraced it as part of their regular diet.

Around the same time as it began, people began offering dried fish to the gods at the local temples. Today, himono is offered to the Shinto sun goddess, Amaterasu Omikami, at the Ise Grand Shrine in Mie Prefecture.
