= Roman fish salting factory =

Ruins of a Roman fish salting factory in Spain

Coordinates: 36°07′32″N 5°26′38″W

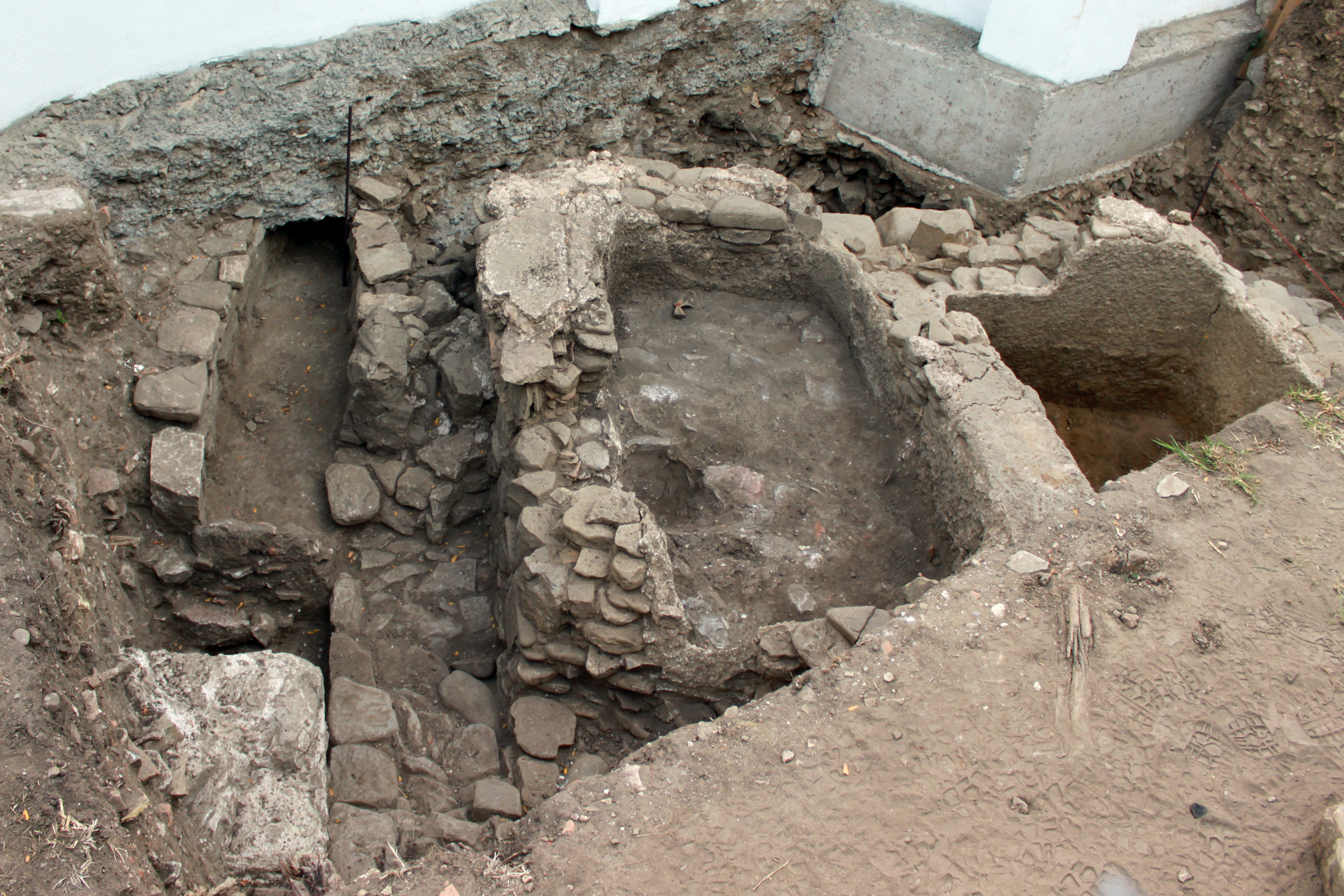
Roman fish salting factory

The Roman fish salting factory (Spanish: Factoría romana de salazones) was a salting factory established on the seafront of Algeciras, southeastern Spain by the Romans. It belonged to the fishing village of San Nicolás, part of what was called Caetaria. A site of archaeological and historical interest, it was declared a Bien de Interés Cultural site on 27 June 2002.
