= Akita Ondo =

Japanese folk song

Akita Ondo (秋田音頭; meaning "the Akita Marching Song") is a folk song of Akita prefecture, Japan. It is said that it was created when Kubota domain in Akita prefecture was inspected by Yoshitaka Satake in 1663. It was originally known simply as the "Ondo" ("Marching Song"), but it is said that around the beginning of the Meiji era it became known as the "Akita Ondo".

The unique characteristic of the Akita Ondo is its litany of humorous lyrics, accompanied by instruments like the shamisen, flute, and bell. Besides the initial cry "yātonā" (or "yātosei"), few musical intervals are used. The verses are simply laid out upon a 7-7-9 rhythm, in style similar to modern rap music.

== Lyrics ==
Japanese	Transliteration	Literal translation
（ヤートセー）コラ、秋田音頭です（ハイ、キタカサッサー、ヨイサッサ、ヨイナー）	(yātosei) kora, Akita Ondo desu (hai, kitakasassā, yoisassa, yoinā)	Yaatose, This is the "Akita Dance Song".
コラ、いずれこれよりご免こうむり音頭の無駄をいう（アーソレソレ）	kora, izure koreyori gomen koumuri, Ondo no muda wo iu (ā sore sore)	Well anyhow, please forgive me as I launch into the Ondo's nonsense.
お耳障りもあろうけれどもさっさと出しかけな	omimi sawari mo arou keredomo, sassato dashikake na	There may be some objections from your ears, but here I go.
コラ、秋田名物八森ハタハタ、男鹿で男鹿ブリコ（アーソレソレ）	kora, Akita meibutsu: Hachimori, Hatahata, Oga de Oga buriko (ā sore sore)	Akita's famous products: Hachimori butterfish, Oga yellowtail,
能代春慶、桧山納豆、大館曲げわっぱ	Noshiro shunkei, Hiyama nattō, Ōdate magewappa	Noshiro lacquerware, Hiyama fermented soybeans, and Odate birchbark vessels.

== See also ==
- Meibutsu
