= Nam pla =

Thai fish sauce

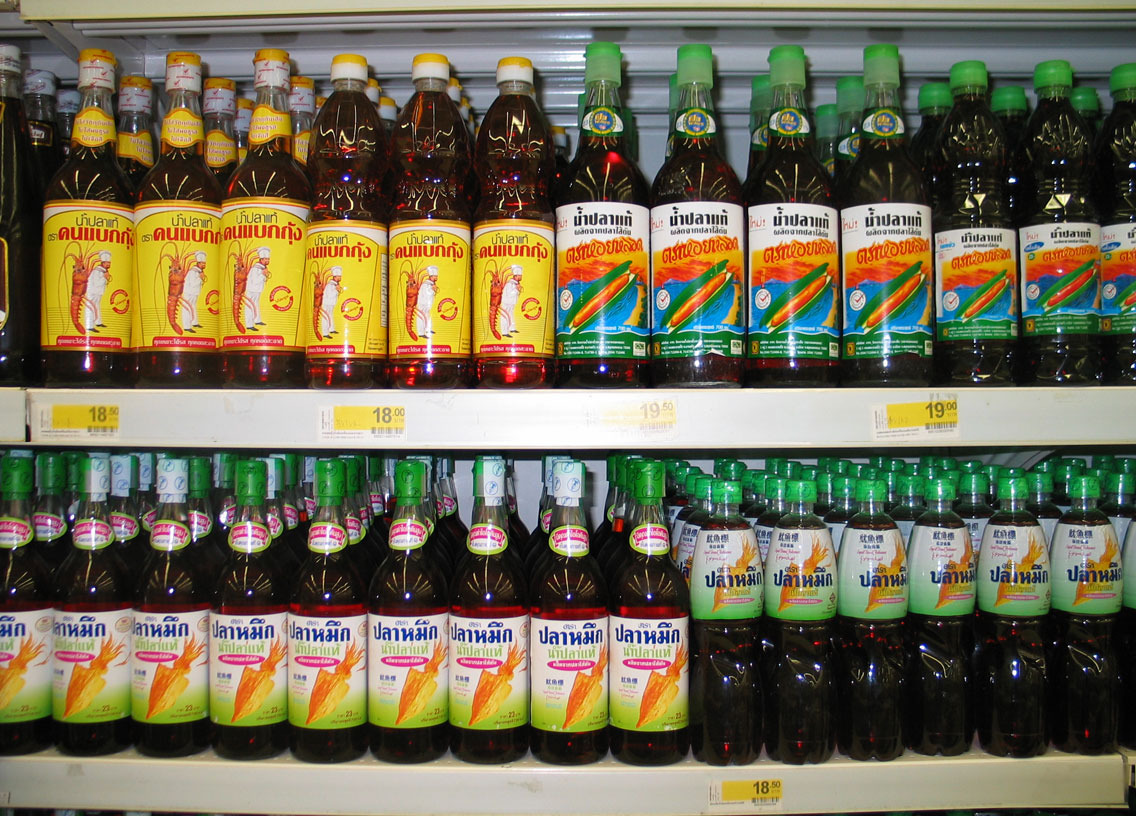
Several brands of Thai nam pla (fish sauce)

Nam pla (Thai: น้ำปลา, literally “fish water”) is the most common fish sauce used in Thailand. It is considered an essential seasoning in Thai cooking, and is produced commercially in several coastal provinces.

== Overview ==
Nam pla ranges from inexpensive brands to premium bottlings. In Thailand it is placed on tables in street stalls, diners, and hotel restaurants alike, in much the same way soy sauce is provided in Japan.

Most production is industrial rather than home-made. Manufacturers are concentrated in the Gulf-coast provinces of Chonburi and Rayong, and in Mahachai (Samut Sakhon).

== Production ==
The raw material is small marine fish of the family Engraulidae or the genus Corica. Whole fish are mixed with 30–50 percent salt (by weight) and packed into jars or concrete tanks under lids and weight. Protein breakdown is almost complete after a few months; commercial ageing is usually 12–18 months.

In the first pressing or first grade, the first liquid drawn off, and sugar is added before bottling.

In the second pressing or second grade, brine and an amino-acid solution are added to the residue and allowed to steep 5–15 days. The liquid is bottled with a small amount of acetic acid.

In the third pressing or third grade, the remaining solids are boiled with brine and treated with acetic acid and amino acids. The final price is roughly one-third that of first-grade.

Some makers use freshwater fish from the Chao Phraya basin; the spent mash from this process is mixed with roasted-rice powder and rice bran and sold as pla ra (fermented fish paste).

Artificial, caramel-coloured “fish sauces” made without fermentation were banned in the 1980s.

== Culinary use ==
First- and second-grade nam pla are used chiefly as table dipping sauces, while third-grade sauce is used in cooking. A survey of 2,312 recipes in classic Thai cookbooks found nam pla in 1,265 of them, making it the single most frequently used seasoning.

== History ==
Commercial nam pla dates only to the early 20th century. Before that, cooks in the northeast (Isan) used the liquid by-product of homemade fermented fish paste (nam pa daek), while central Thais used imported Vietnamese nước mắm. In 1922 Teochew Chinese immigrants copied nước mắm and marketed their own fish sauce for Thai consumers, naming it nam pla (“fish liquid”). Many present-day producers are descendants of those early Teochew workers.

== See also ==
- Nước mắm – Vietnamese fish sauce
