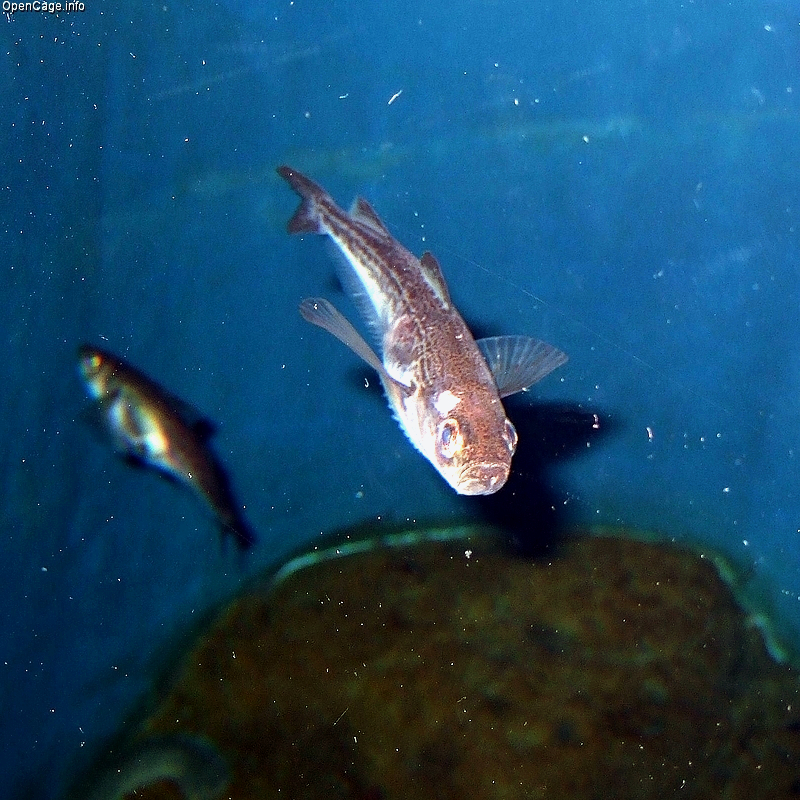
- Arctoscopus japonicus (Japanese sandfish)

Scientific classification
- Kingdom: Animalia
- Phylum: Chordata
- Class: Actinopterygii
- Order: Perciformes
- Suborder: Cottoidei
- Superfamily: Trichodontoidea; Nazarkin & Voskoboinikova, 2000
- Family: Trichodontidae; Bleeker, 1869

Genera
- See text

= Trichodontidae =

Sandfishes Temporal range: Middle Miocene to present

Family of ray-finned fishes

Trichodontidae, the sandfishes, is a small family of ray-finned fishes from the order Perciformes. The species in this family are found in the North Pacific Ocean.

== Taxonomy ==
Trichodontidae was first proposed as a family in 1869 by the Dutch herpetologist and ichthyologist Pieter Bleeker. For a long time the family was thought to be classified within the order Trachiniformes but in 2000 the family was reclassified by the Russian biologists Mikhail Nazarkin and Olga Voskoboinikova the monotypic superfamily Trichodontoidea in the suborder Cottoidei of the order Scorpaeniformes. Other workers have found that if the Scorpaeniformes, as delimited in the 5the edition of Fishes of the World, is not included in the Perciformes it renders the Perciformes paraphyletic. These workers retain the Cottoidei as a suborder within the Perciformes but include the zoarcoids and Sticklebacks and allies as the infraorders Zoarcales and Gasterosteales while reclassifying most of the superfamilies of Fishes of the World as infraorders with the Trichodontidae included in the infraorder Cottales.

== Genera and species ==
The family consists of three monotypic genera, two extant and one extinct:

- Arctoscopus Jordan and Evermann, 1896
  - Arctoscopus japonicus (Steindachner, 1881) (Japanese sandfish)
- †Diaphantes Nazarkin & Voskoboinikova, 2000
  - †Diaphantes tilesii Nazarkin & Voskoboinikova, 2000
- Trichodon Tilesius, 1813
  - Trichodon trichodon (Tilesius, 1813) (Pacific sandfish)

† means extinct

== Characteristics ==
Trichodontid sandfishes are characterised by being small deep, highly compressed bodies with an overall silvery colour. They have a large oblique, upward pointing mouth which has 2 or 3 rows of small sharp teeth on the jaws and vomer. There is a fleshy fringe on the lips. There are 5 obvious spines on the preoperculum. They have 2 dorsal fins, the first dorsal fin contains between 8 and 16 spines and is clearly separated from the second dorsal fin which may have a single spine, or none, and between 12 and 20 soft rays. The anal fin may hold a single spine, or there may be none, and also has between 28 and 32 soft rays. The large caudal fin is either forked or truncate and the pectoral fins are large and fan-shaped, these fins extend to the middle of the vent and have 21-27 thickened fin rays. The pelvic fins are located on the thorax and contain a single spine and 5 soft rays. There is a single pair of tube-like nostrils and these fishes have no scales although the lateral line canal is well-developed and is situated high on the body parallel and near the base of the dorsal fin. The extant species both have maximum total lengths of around 30 cm (12 in).

== Distribution and habitat ==
Trichodontid sandfishes are found in the North Pacific Ocean from Japan to California where they are found from the intertidal zone down to depths of 400 m (1,300 ft), although they are typically found in less than 200 m (660 ft). They prefer soft substrates with a flat topography.

== Biology ==
Trichodontid sandfishes are mainly nocturnal and are attracted to lights on the surface. During the day they rest partially buried in the substrate with only the highest parts of the fish visible. They feed on small invertebrates.
