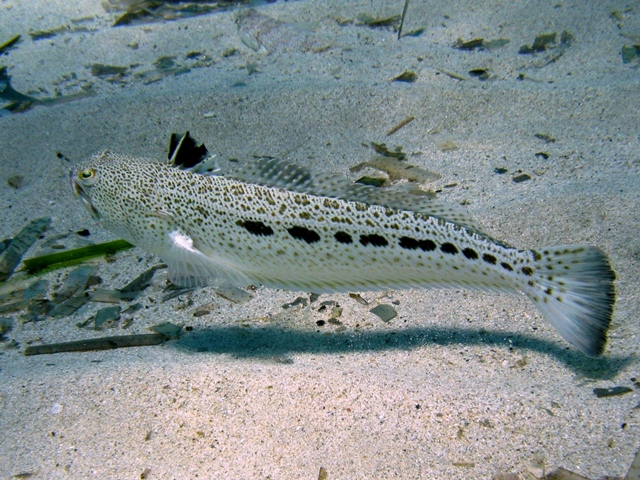
- Trachinus araneus, Sardinia
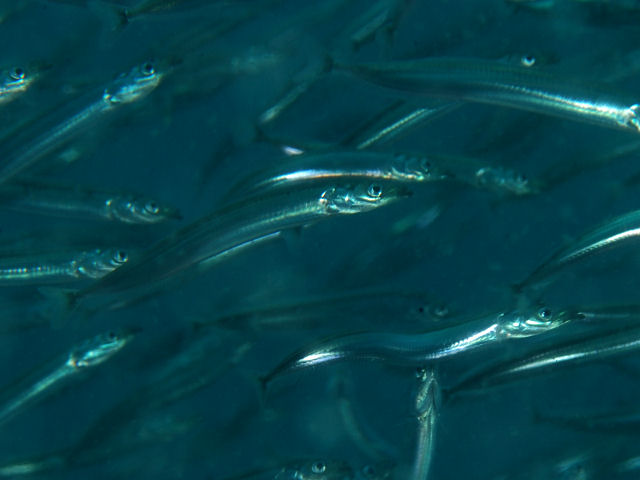
- Ammodytes personatus

Scientific classification
- Kingdom: Animalia
- Phylum: Chordata
- Class: Actinopterygii
- Clade: Percomorpha
- Order: Trachiniformes

Families
- see text

= Trachiniformes =

Trachiniformes Temporal range: Early Eocene to present

Polyphyletic order of fishes

Trachiniformes is an order of percomorph bony fish, whose contents are traditionally placed in suborder Trachinoidei of Perciformes.

However, Trachiniformes is recovered as polyphyletic in recent large scale molecular phylogenetic studies. Trachinidae itself is recovered as part of Percoidei, while other families respectively belong to Scombriformes, Gobiiformes, new orders Uranoscopiformes and Pempheriformes, and other clades in Perciformes.

== Families ==
The following families make up the Trachiniformes: (with respectively belonging taxa following the molecular phylogenies)

- Ammodytidae Bonaparte, 1832 - sandeels or sandlances (considered as part of Uranoscopiformes).
- †Callipterygidae Jordan, 1905 (fossil; Eocene of Italy)
- Chiasmodontidae Jordan & Gilbert, 1883 - the swallowers (considered as part of Scombriformes).
- Champsodontidae Jordan & Snyder, 1902 - gulpers, gapers or crocodile toothfishes (considered as part of Pempheriformes).
- Cheimarrichthyidae Regan, 1913 - New Zealand torrentfishes (considered as part of Uranoscopiformes).
- Creediidae Waite, 1899 - sandburrowers (considered as part of Pempheriformes).
- Leptoscopidae Gill, 1859 - southern sandfishes (considered as part of Pempheriformes).
- Percophidae Swainson, 1839 - duckbills (as a polyphyly, respectively part of Pempheriformes and Perciformes (Notothenioidei and Bembropoidei)).
- Pinguipedidae Günther, 1860 - sandperches (considered as part of Uranoscopiformes).
- Trachinidae Rafinesque, 181 - weeverfishes (considered as part of Percoidei, belong to Perciformes).
- Trichodontidae Bleeker, 1859 - sandfish (considered as a part of Cottoidei, belong to Scorpaeniformes).
- Trichonotidae Günther, 1861 - sanddivers (considered to form the monotypic Trichonotoidei, belong to Gobiiformes).
- Uranoscopidae Bonaparte, 1831 - stargazers (considered as part of Uranoscopiformes).
