= Flinders Reef =

Coordinates: 26°59′18″S 153°26′31.4″E

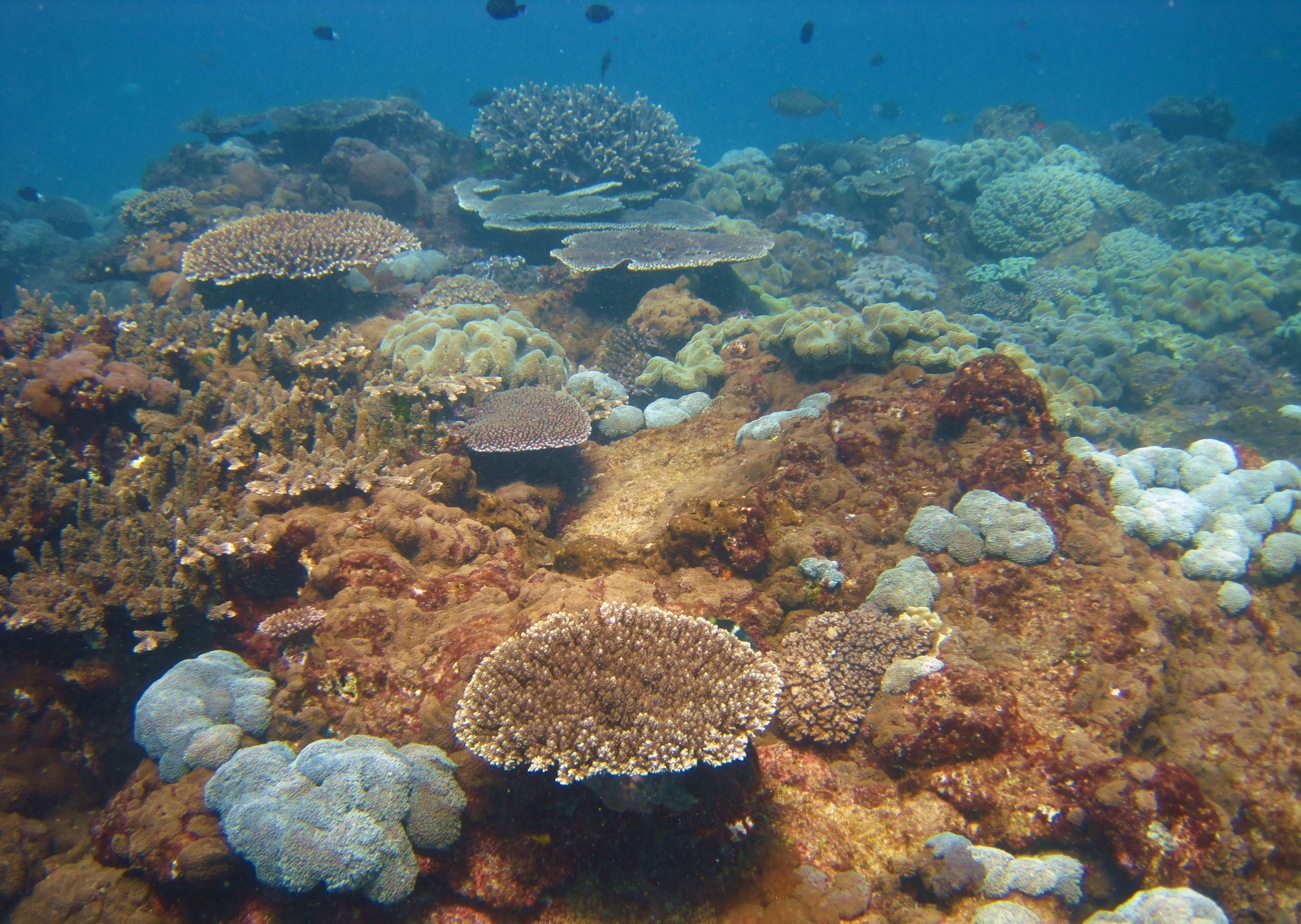
Coral in the reef

Flinders Reef is a small isolated reef near Moreton Island, 5 kilometres (3 mi) north-east of Cape Moreton in South East Queensland, Australia. It has the highest number of coral species of any subtropical reef system along Australia's east coast and is the nearest true coral reef to Brisbane. Flinders Reef is one of South East Queensland's most popular dive sites. The reef is located within the Moreton Bay Marine Park and is monitored by the Reef Check conservation program. The reef is located within the Tweed–Moreton marine biogeographic region.

There is a second Flinders Reef in the Coral Sea 120 nautical miles (220 km) north-east of Townsville. A weather station there is monitored by the Australian Government. A third Flinders Reef exists offshore from the town of 1770.

== Fauna ==
The reef has more than 175 fish species. There are more species and varieties of corals in this one area than any other single reef on the Great Barrier Reef. The diverse amount of marine life include schools of wrasse, sweetlip, trevally, parrotfish, bat, surgeon, turtles and tropical fish. Manta rays, wobbegongs and leopard sharks are among the larger creatures that reside here. Sightings of whaler sharks are sometimes seen on the eastern side of Flinders. During the months of June to September, humpback whales can be seen on the surface as they pass by.

The Australian bluefish, Sixgill stingray, the rare Narrowbar swellshark have been found on the reef.

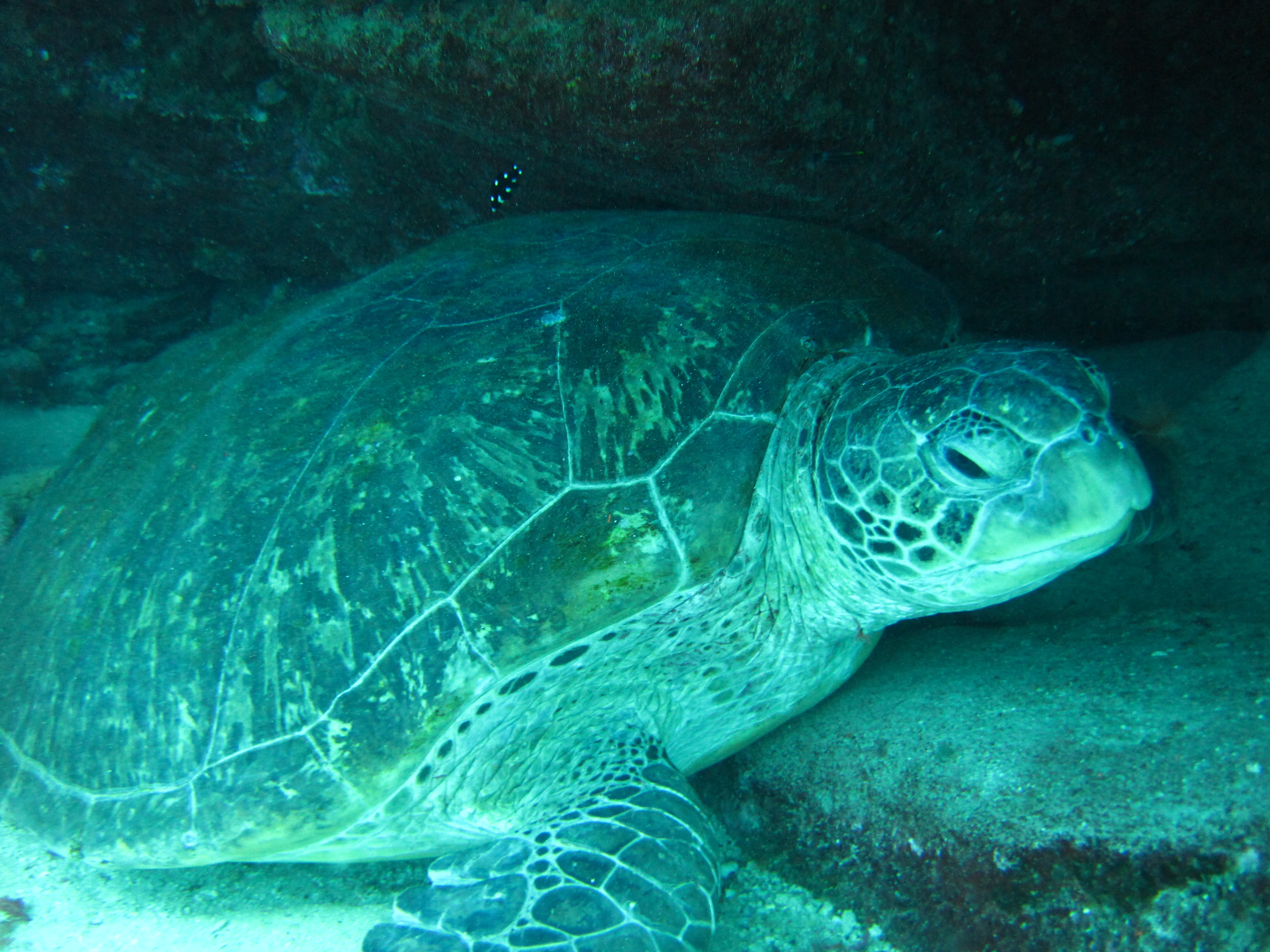
Green sea turtle

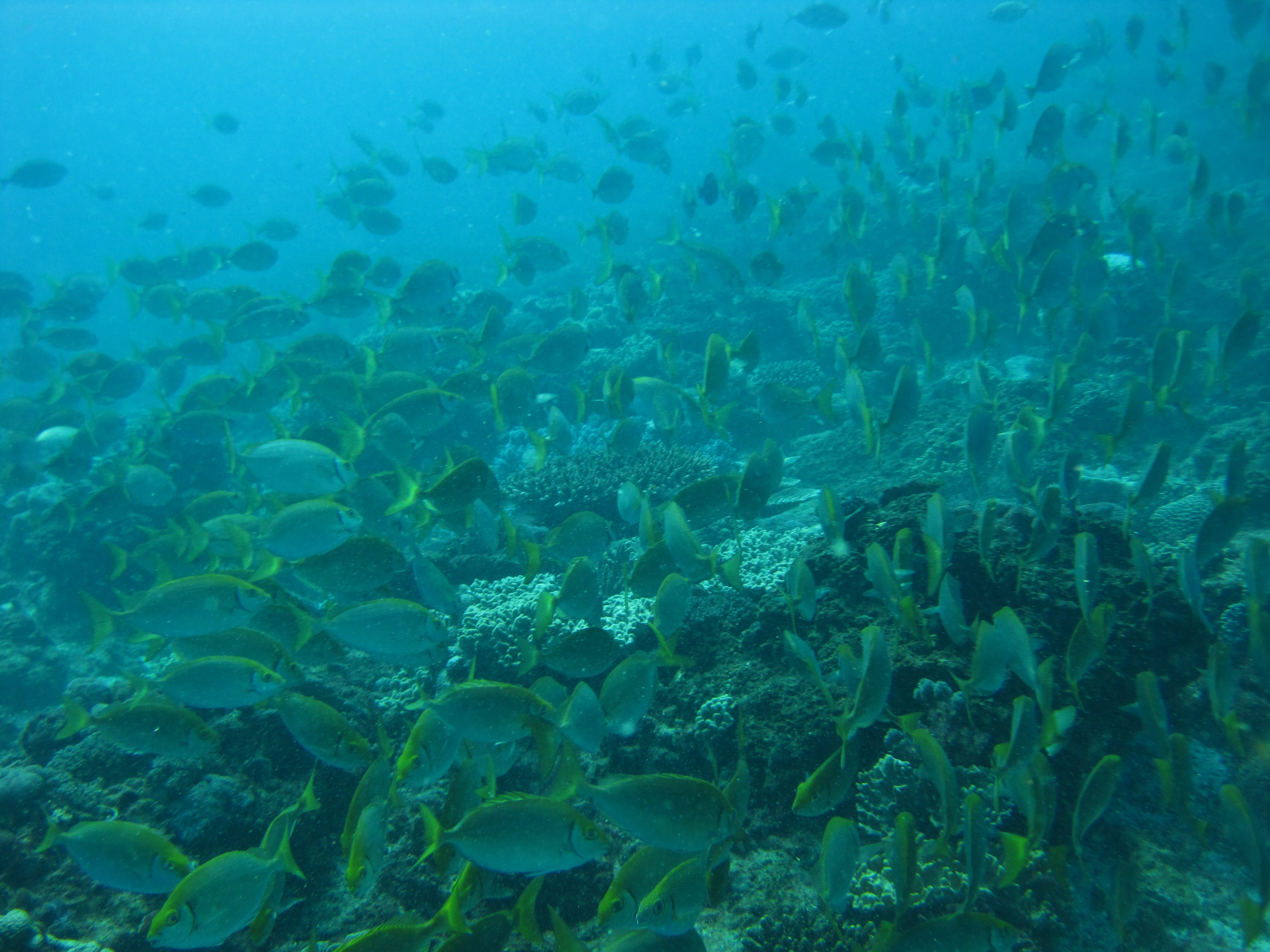
School of fish

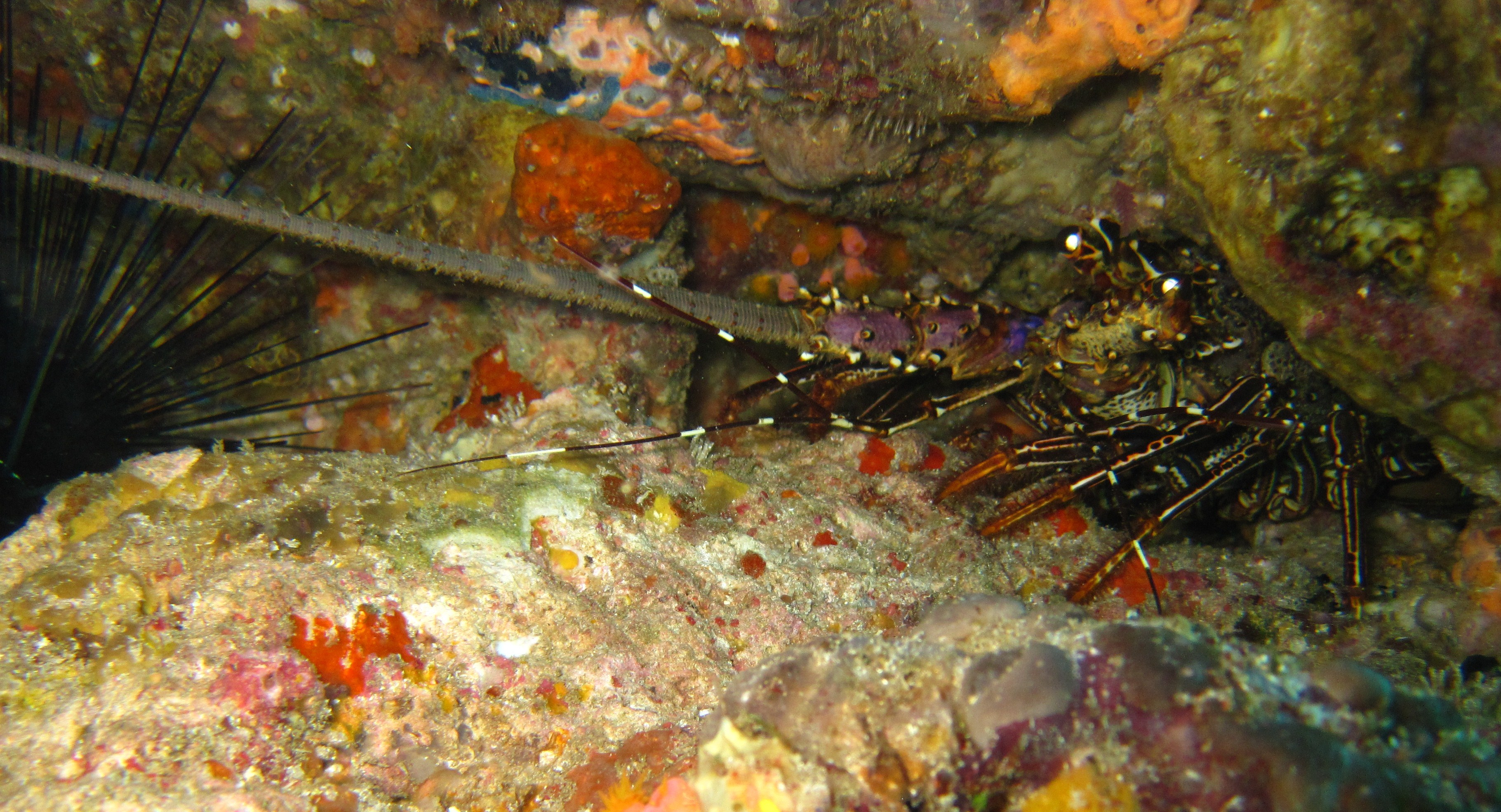
Crayfish

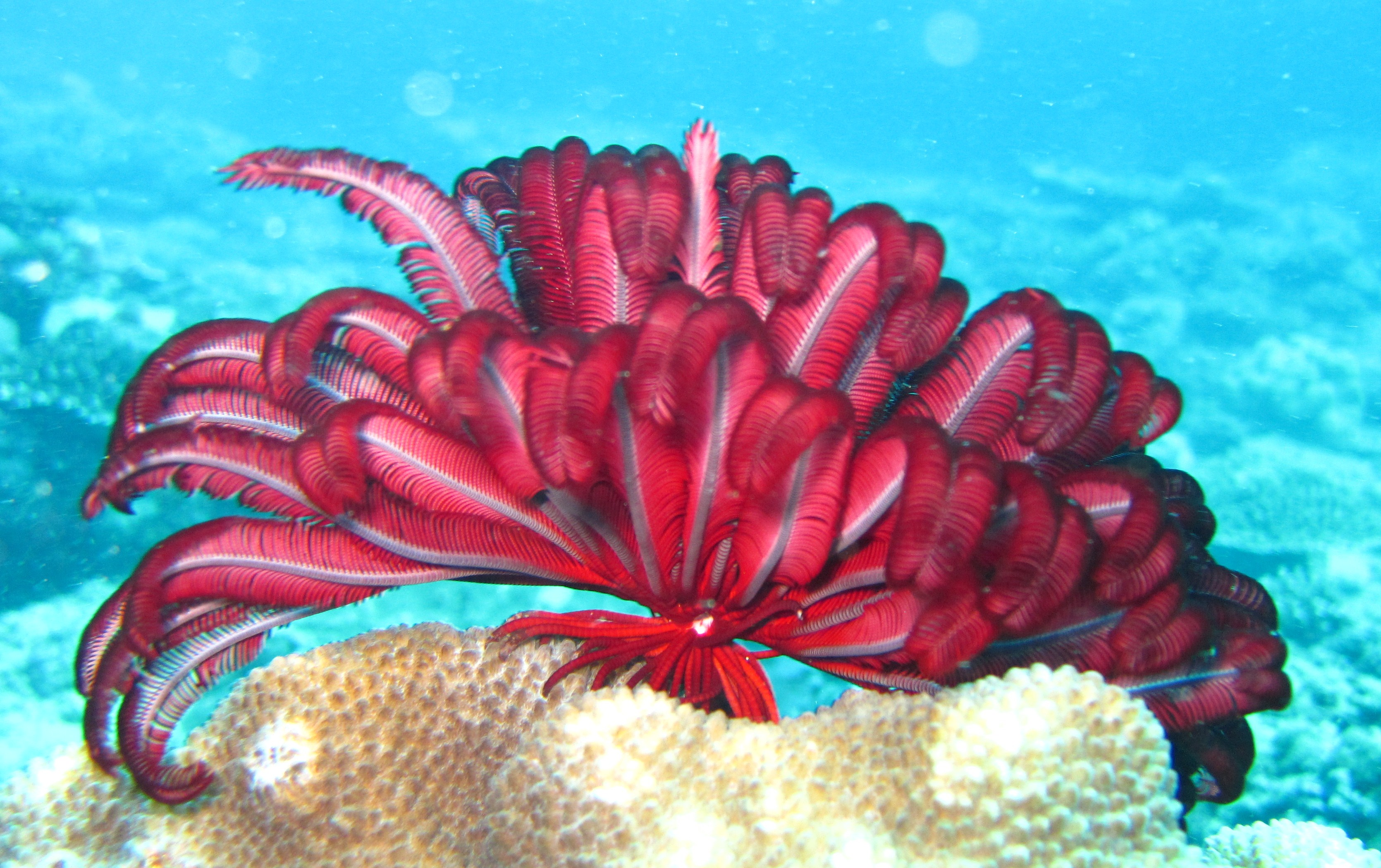
Himerometra robustipinna

== History ==
The reef is named after Matthew Flinders who discovered the reef before discovering what would become the city of Brisbane.

In 1986 the Australian Army ship Crusader (AV2767) was sunk near the reef and has become a popular dive wreck. The reef was zoned as a marine park in 1998. The reef was not affected by the 2009 southeast Queensland oil spill.

The reef is often the location for small fishing boat wrecks, and rarely, diving incidents including the death of a Brisbane man in March 2005. It was the site of a helicopter rescue after a dive ship ran aground on the reef in December 2008.

== See also ==
- List of reefs
- Moreton Bay
- Protected areas of Queensland
