= T. cornutus =

T. cornutus may refer to:

- Trachinus cornutus, a weever species in the genus Trachinus
- Triaenobunus cornutus, a harvestman species in the genus Triaenobunus
- Turbo cornutus, a mollusc species

== See also ==
- Cornutus (disambiguation)
