= Creedia haswelli =

Scientific classification
- Kingdom: Animalia
- Phylum: Chordata
- Class: Actinopterygii
- Order: Acropomatiformes
- Family: Creediidae
- Genus: Creedia
- Species: C. haswelli

Binomial name
- Creedia haswelli (E. P. Ramsay, 1881)

Synonyms
- Hemerocoetes haswelli Ramsay, 1881

Species of sandburrower

Creedia haswelli, the slender sandburrower, is a species of marine ray-finned fish belonging to the family Creediidae, the sandburrowers. This species is found in Southern Australia. This species reaches a length of 7.5 cm (3.0 in).

== Taxonomy ==
Creedia haswelli was first formally described as Hemerocoetes haswelli in 1881 by the Australian zoologist Edward Pierson Ramsay with its type locality given as Port Head in Port Jackson in New South Wales. This species is classified within the genus Creedia, which contains 4 species, which is the type genus of the family Creediidae. The 5th edition of Fishes of the World classifies this family within the order Trachiniformes.

== Etymology ==
Creedia haswelli is named in honour of Scots-born Australian zoologist William Aitcheson Haswell.
