= Sailfin weever =

Conservation status
- Data Deficient (IUCN 3.1)

Scientific classification
- Domain: Eukaryota
- Kingdom: Animalia
- Phylum: Chordata
- Class: Actinopterygii
- Order: Perciformes
- Family: Trachinidae
- Genus: Trachinus
- Species: T. collignoni

Binomial name
- Trachinus collignoni Roux, 1957

Species of fish

The sailfin weever, Trachinus collignoni, is a fish of the family Trachinidae, order Perciformes, and class Actinopterygii. Widespread in the Eastern Atlantic along the tropical coast of west Africa, Gabon and Congo, probably further north and south. Marine tropical fish, up to 15 centimetres (5.9 in) in length.
