= Striped weever =

Conservation status
- Least Concern (IUCN 3.1)

Scientific classification
- Domain: Eukaryota
- Kingdom: Animalia
- Phylum: Chordata
- Class: Actinopterygii
- Order: Perciformes
- Family: Trachinidae
- Genus: Trachinus
- Species: T. lineolatus

Binomial name
- Trachinus lineolatus Fischer, 1885

Species of fish

The striped weever, Trachinus lineolatus, is a fish of the family Trachinidae. Widespread in the Eastern Atlantic from Guinea-Bissau to São Tomé Island and Gabon, it is a marine tropical demersal fish, up to 15 centimetres (5.9 in) in length.
