= Limnichthys rendahli =

Scientific classification
- Domain: Eukaryota
- Kingdom: Animalia
- Phylum: Chordata
- Class: Actinopterygii
- Order: Acropomatiformes
- Family: Creediidae
- Genus: Limnichthys
- Species: L. rendahli

Binomial name
- Limnichthys rendahli Parrott, 1958

Species of ray-finned fish

Limnichthys rendahli is a species of sandburrower endemic to the waters around New Zealand to depths of about 150 m, on sandy or gravelly bottoms. Its length is between 3 and 8 cm.
