= Creedia partimsquamigera =

Scientific classification
- Kingdom: Animalia
- Phylum: Chordata
- Class: Actinopterygii
- Order: Acropomatiformes
- Family: Creediidae
- Genus: Creedia
- Species: C. partimsquamigera

Binomial name
- Creedia partimsquamigera J. S. Nelson, 1983

Species of sandburrower

Creedia partimsquamigera, the half-scaled sand-diver, is a species of sandburrowers found around Sydney, Australia. This species reaches a length of 7.0 cm (2.8 in).
