= Creedia alleni =

Scientific classification
- Domain: Eukaryota
- Kingdom: Animalia
- Phylum: Chordata
- Class: Actinopterygii
- Order: Acropomatiformes
- Family: Creediidae
- Genus: Creedia
- Species: C. alleni

Binomial name
- Creedia alleni J. S. Nelson, 1983

Species of sandburrower

Creedia alleni is a species of sandburrowers found in the Eastern Indian Ocean in Australia. This species reaches a length of 4 cm (1.6 in).

== Etymology ==
The sandburrower is named in honor of Gerald R. Allen (b. 1942), of the Western Australia Museum in Perth, who was the one who brought this species to Nelson's attention.
