= Trachinus pellegrini =

Cape Verde weever

Conservation status
- Least Concern (IUCN 3.1)

Scientific classification
- Domain: Eukaryota
- Kingdom: Animalia
- Phylum: Chordata
- Class: Actinopterygii
- Order: Perciformes
- Family: Trachinidae
- Genus: Trachinus
- Species: T. pellegrini

Binomial name
- Trachinus pellegrini Cadenat, 1937

Species of fish

Trachinus pellegrini, the Cape Verde weever, is a fish of the family Trachinidae. Widespread in the eastern Atlantic along the coasts of Senegal to Nigeria, including the Canary Islands and Cape Verde, and also reported from Mauritania, it is a marine tropical demersal fish, up to 20 centimetres (7.9 in) in length. The species was named and described by Jean Cadenat in 1937 and the specific name honours the French ichthyologist Jacques Pellegrin (1873–1944), who worked at the Muséum National d'Histoire Naturelle in Paris.
