= Creedia bilineata =

Scientific classification
- Domain: Eukaryota
- Kingdom: Animalia
- Phylum: Chordata
- Class: Actinopterygii
- Order: Acropomatiformes
- Family: Creediidae
- Genus: Creedia
- Species: C. bilineata

Binomial name
- Creedia bilineata Shimada & Yoshino, 1987

Species of sandburrower

Creedia bilineata is a species of sandburrowers found in the Northwest Pacific Ocean around Japan. This species reaches a length of 3.2 cm (1.3 in).

== Etymology ==
The sandburrower is named because it has two lines on the sides of the fish.
