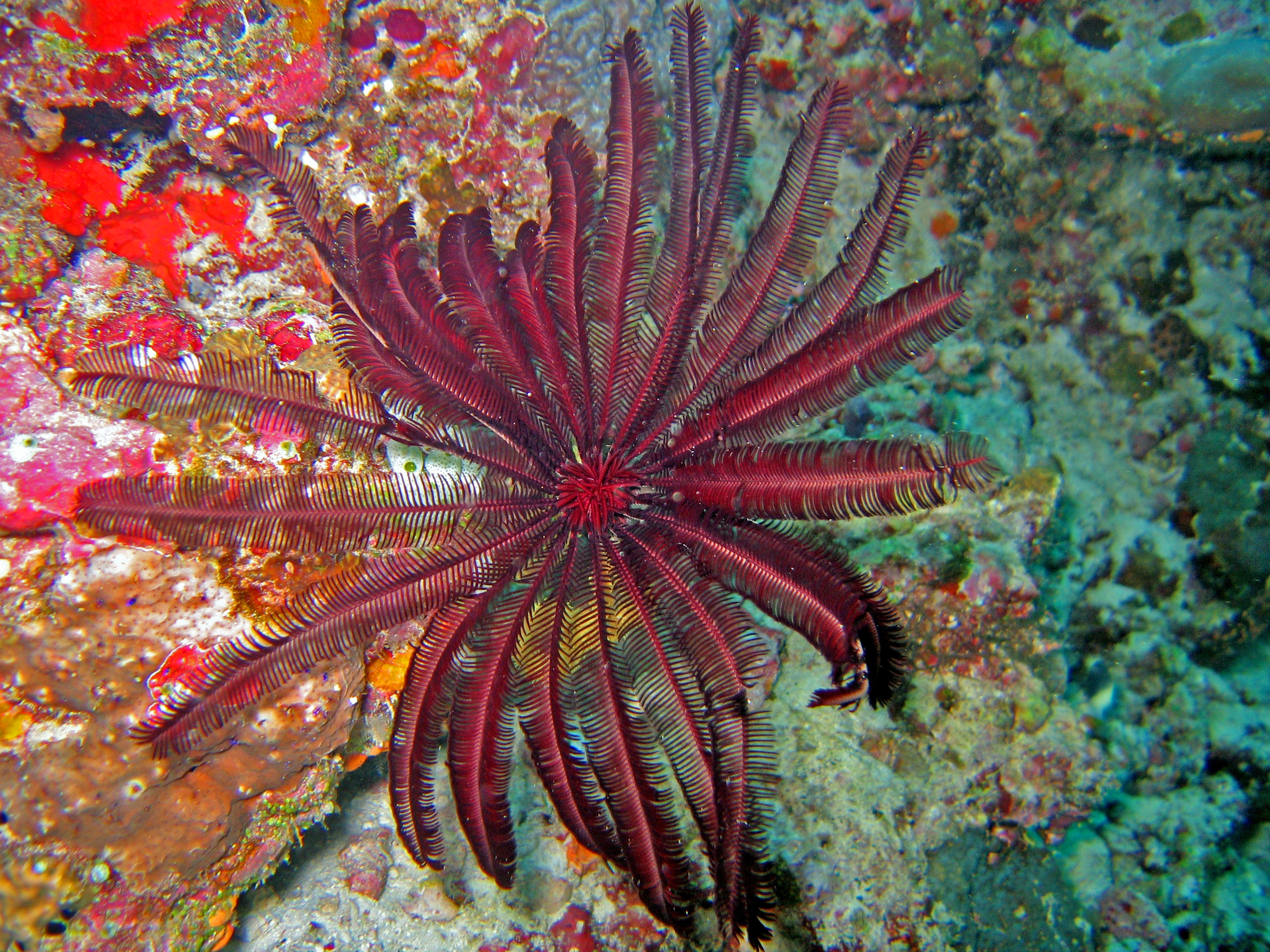
- Himerometra robustipinna

Scientific classification
- Kingdom: Animalia
- Phylum: Echinodermata
- Class: Crinoidea
- Superorder: Articulata
- Order: Comatulida
- Family: Himerometridae
- Genus: Himerometra; A.H. Clark, 1907

= Himerometra =

Genus of crinoids

Himerometra is a genus of crinoids belonging to the family Himerometridae.

== Species ==
- Himerometra bartschi AH Clark, 1908
- Himerometra martensi Hartlaub, 1890
- Himerometra persica AH Clark, 1907
- Himerometra palmata ?
- Himerometra robustipinna Carpenter, 1881
- Himerometra sol AH Clark, 1912
