= Narrowbar swellshark =

Conservation status
- Data Deficient (IUCN 3.1)

Scientific classification
- Kingdom: Animalia
- Phylum: Chordata
- Class: Chondrichthyes
- Subclass: Elasmobranchii
- Division: Selachii
- Order: Carcharhiniformes
- Family: Scyliorhinidae
- Genus: Cephaloscyllium
- Species: C. zebrum

Binomial name
- Cephaloscyllium zebrum Last & W. T. White, 2008

Species of shark

The narrowbar swellshark (Cephaloscyllium zebrum) is a rare species of catshark, and part of the family Scyliorhinidae, known only from two specimens collected near Flinders Reef off northeastern Australia. This species reaches at least 44.5 cm (17.5 in) in length, and has a stocky body with a short, broad head. It can be readily identified by its zebra-like dorsal color pattern of transverse brown bars on a yellowish background. Like other swellsharks, it can inflate its body as a defensive measure.

== Taxonomy ==
In 1994, Commonwealth Scientific and Industrial Research Organisation (CSIRO) chief researchers Peter Last and John Stevens applied the provisional name Cephaloscyllium "sp. D" to two striped swellsharks trawled from Flinders Reef in December 1985. One was a 44.5 cm (17.5 in) long male, and the other a 43.5 cm (17.1 in) long female. In 2008, this species was formally described by Peter Last and William White in a CSIRO publication, and given the specific epithet zebrum in reference to its unique color pattern. The male specimen was designated as the holotype and the female a paratype.

== Distribution and habitat ==
The narrowbar swellshark has only been found at a depth of 444–454 m (1,457–1,490 ft) on the upper continental slope, near Flinders Reef off the Australian state of Queensland. Its distribution may be wider than is known.

== Description ==
A small Cephaloscyllium species at around 44 cm (17 in) long, the narrowbar swellshark has a robust body and a short, broad, and flattened head. The snout is rounded, with the nostrils preceded by laterally expanded skin flaps that do not reach the long and narrow mouth. The slit-like eyes are placed high on the head and followed by tiny spiracles. There are no furrows at the corners of the mouth. The tooth rows number 60–61 in the upper jaw and 59–62 in the lower jaw. The teeth are small, most having three cusps in the male specimen and five cusps in the female specimen. The upper teeth are exposed when the mouth is closed. The fourth and fifth gill slits lie over the pectoral fin and are shorter than the first three.

The pectoral fins are broad and moderate in size, with narrowly rounded tips. The first dorsal fin is roughly triangular and originates over the middle of the pelvic fin bases. The second dorsal fin is much smaller than the first, low, and long-based, originating behind the anal fin origin. The pelvic fins are small, with elongate claspers in males. The anal fin is rounded and much larger and deeper than the second dorsal fin. The medium-sized caudal fin has a distinct lower lobe and a strong ventral notch near the tip of the upper lobe. The body is densely covered by fine, arrowhead-shaped dermal denticles bearing median and lateral ridges. The dorsal coloration is unique among swellsharks, consisting of 31–34 closely spaced, transverse dark brown bars on a creamy yellow background; on the snout the bars are irregular, while towards the tail every other bar becomes faint. The underside is pale and unmarked.

== Biology and ecology ==
Almost nothing is known of the natural history of the narrowbar swellshark. Like other Cephaloscyllium species, when threatened it is apparently capable of inflating its body.

== Human interactions ==
The International Union for Conservation of Nature (IUCN) has listed the narrowbar swellshark under Data Deficient until more information is available, while noting that there is little fishing activity in the region where it occurs.
