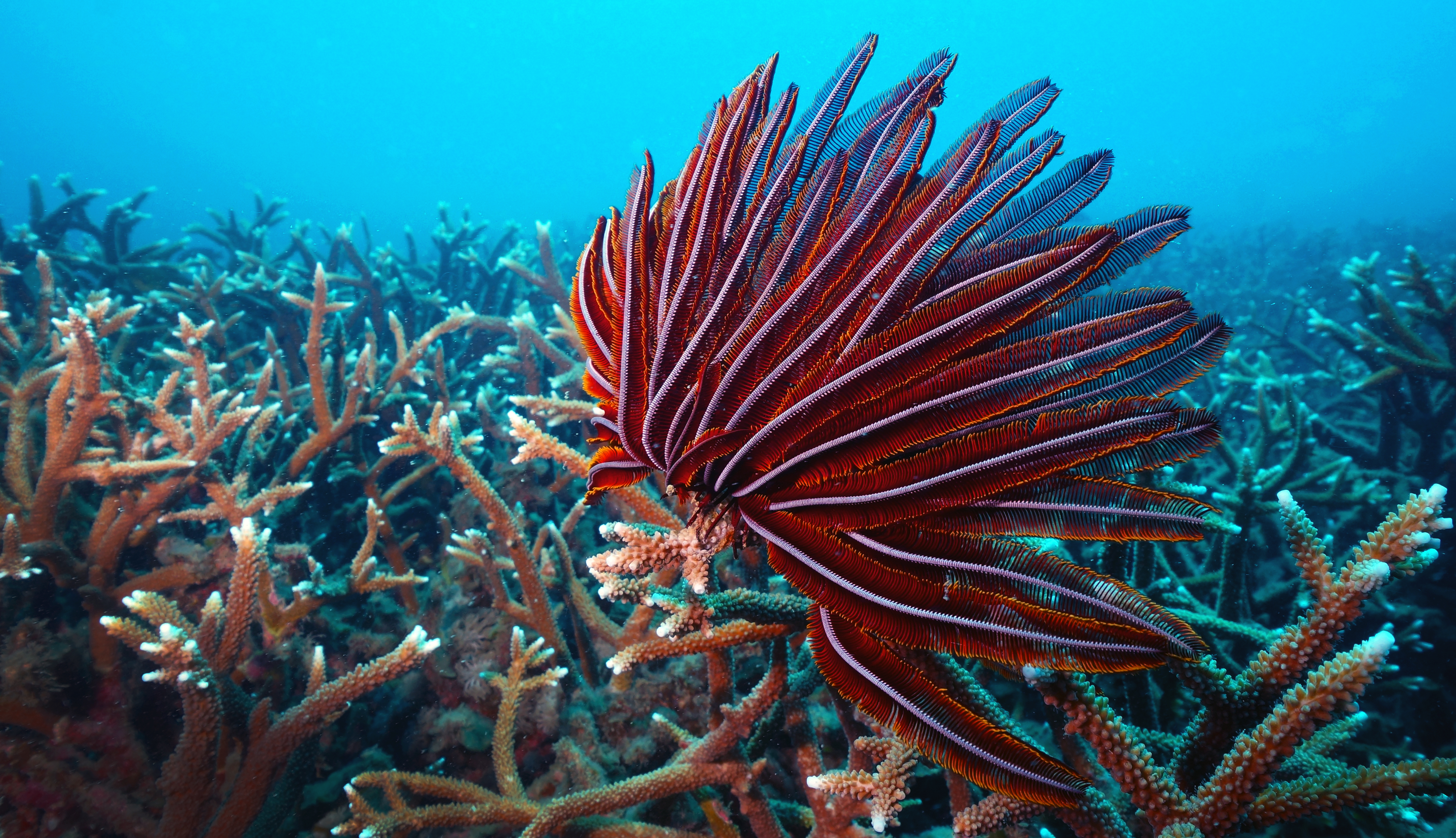

Scientific classification
- Kingdom: Animalia
- Phylum: Echinodermata
- Class: Crinoidea
- Superorder: Articulata
- Order: Comatulida
- Family: Himerometridae
- Genus: Himerometra
- Species: H. robustipinna

Binomial name
- Himerometra robustipinna (Carpenter, 1881)

Synonyms
- Actinometra robustipinna Carpenter, 1881; Antedon crassipinna Hartlaub, 1890; Antedon inopinata Bell, 1894; Antedon kraepelini Hartlaub, 1890; Himerometra kraepelini AH Clark, 1907; Himerometra magnipinna AH Clark, 1908; Himerometra pulcher AH Clark, 1912

= Himerometra robustipinna =

Species of crinoid

Himerometra robustipinna is a species of crinoid belonging to the family Himerometridaem first described as Actinometra robustipinna by Philip Herbert Carpenter in 1881.

== Description ==
Himerometra robustipinna can reach a diameter of about 35 to 40 cm (14 to 16 in). It has a cup-shaped body with 33-62 arms (usually ~45) about 20 cm (8 in) long, extended out from the central disc. Mouth and anus are both on the upper side of the body. Usually this species has reddish or maroon arms, but it may have yellow or pale brown brachials with maroon pinnules. It feeds on detritus, phytoplankton and zooplankton caught by means of a sticky substance on the arms. It can cling onto corals with short appendages called cirri, but it also can freely swim. The larvae of this feather star swim freely with plankton for a few weeks, then they settle down growing into a stalked form. Mature specimen break the stalk becoming free-living.

== Distribution ==
This species is widespread in the western Pacific and in the Indian Ocean, from Bay of Bengal up to China Sea, Great Barrier Reef, Indonesia, Philippines, South Japan.

== Habitat ==
Himerometra robustipinna lives in the coastal waters with a coral reef ecosystem, relatively strong currents, clear water and plankton availability, at a depth of 0 – 57 m.
