= Schizochirus =

Scientific classification
- Kingdom: Animalia
- Phylum: Chordata
- Class: Actinopterygii
- Division: Teleostei
- Order: Acropomatiformes
- Family: Creediidae
- Genus: Schizochirus
- Species: S. insolens

Binomial name
- Schizochirus insolens Waite, 1904

Species of ray-finned fish

Schizochirus insolens, the brokenfin sandburrower, is a species of sandburrower native to the coastal waters and bays of eastern Australia from Rockhampton, Queensland to Sydney. This species grows to a length of 5.3 centimetres (2.1 in) SL. This species is the only known member of its genus.
