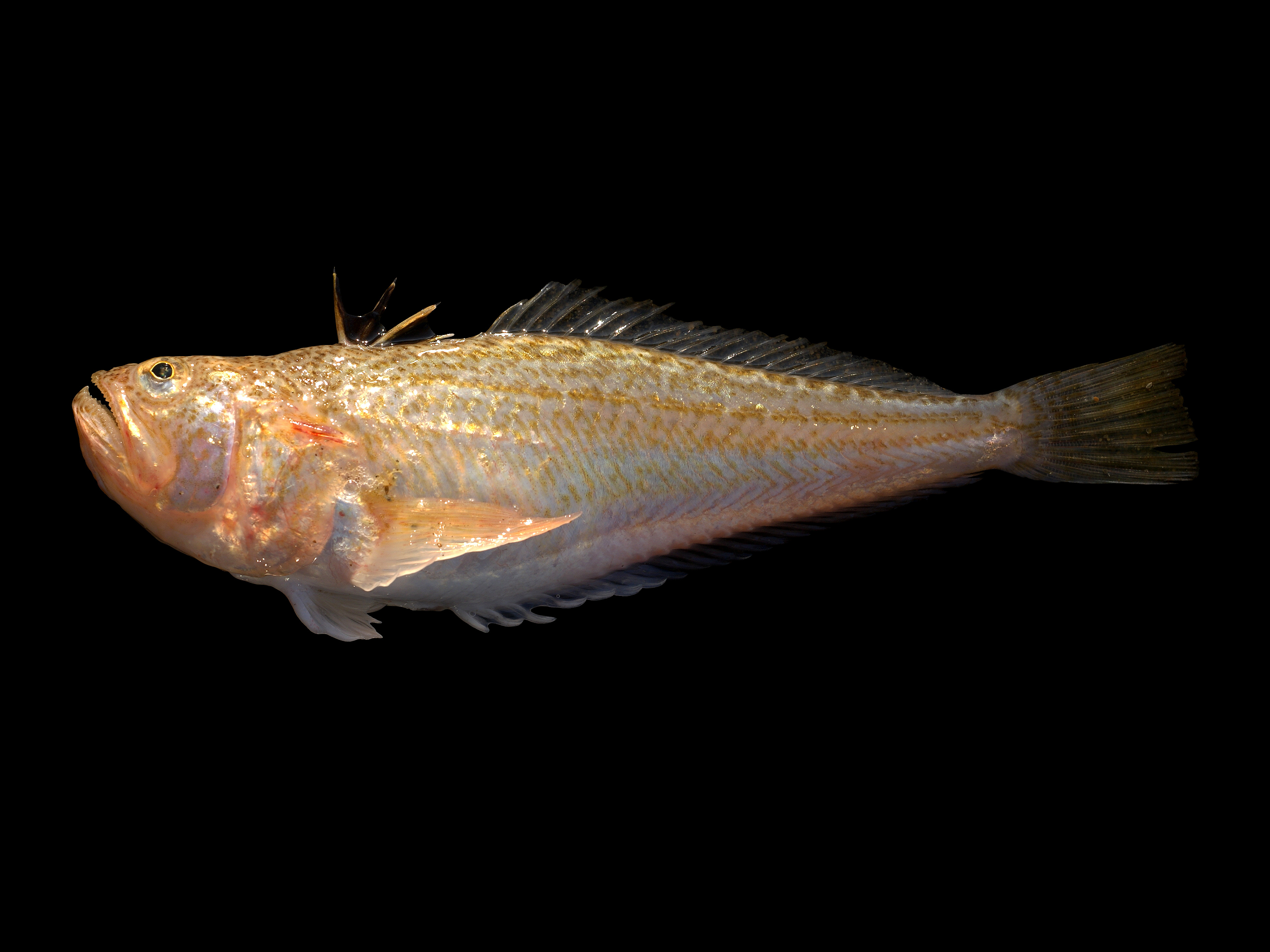

Conservation status
- Least Concern (IUCN 3.1)

Scientific classification
- Kingdom: Animalia
- Phylum: Chordata
- Class: Actinopterygii
- Order: Perciformes
- Family: Trachinidae
- Genus: Echiichthys; Bleeker, 1861
- Species: E. vipera

Binomial name
- Echiichthys vipera (Cuvier, 1829)

Synonyms
- Trigla trachinus Bloch & Schneider, 1801; Trachinus vipera Cuvier, 1829; Trachinus horridus Gronow, 1854

= Lesser weever =

Species of fish

The lesser weever (Echiichthys vipera) is a venomous weever of the family Trachinidae, in the order Perciformes, and the class Actinopterygii. It is generally found on the sandy sea beds of the open sea, near the shore. Lesser weevers may sting swimmers badly if disturbed in the water, and fishermen when they clean their fishing nets.

The lesser weever grows up to 27.7 cm (10.9 in) long, but generally less than 10 cm (3.9 in), with an elongated body. Its color can be described as greyish-brown on the back and silvery-white on the sides. It has no spines in front of its eyes.

== Habitat ==
Lesser weever fish occur in the eastern Atlantic from the North Sea around the British Isles to Morocco and Madeira, and in the Mediterranean. It is typically found resting on the bottom, partially buried with its eyes and tip of the first dorsal fin exposed.

== Biology ==
The lesser weever is littoral and benthic, living on sandy, muddy bottoms, ranging from a few meters deep to 150 m (in winter). Resting on the bottom, its position can be described as with eyes buried and the tip of the first dorsal fin exposed. Because of its venom and its occurrence near beaches, it is considered to be one of Europe's most dangerous weever species. The venom glands are located on its first dorsal fin, which is completely black, and on the gill cover. This species has the most potent toxin of all the weevers. The venom contains a cytolysin, trachinine, as well as serotonin, histamine-realising substances and various enzymes.

== Effect on humans ==
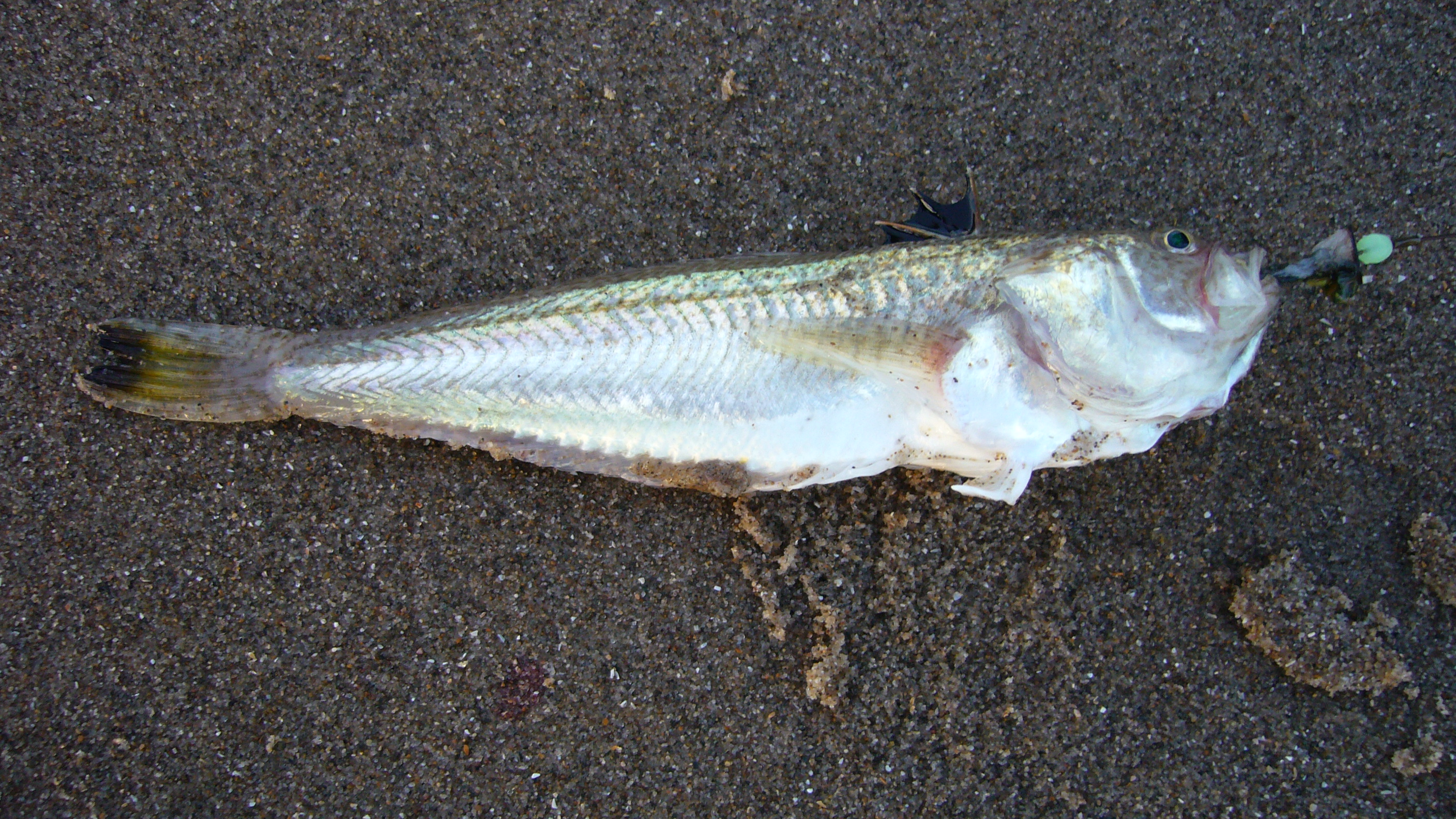
Lesser weever fish, caught whilst beach fishing at Prestatyn, North Wales. Note the highly distinctive venomous dorsal spines (separated by almost-black-coloured skin) and dark-tipped tail

The sting of a weever causes acute and intense pain, which is frequently radiated to the area around the limb. The pain intensity reaches its peak 30 minutes after the sting, and then slowly decreases, but some pain (or other sensation, such as a tingle) may continue to affect the area for up to 24 hours. Very rarely, pain can be propagated to the tributary lymph nodes, i.e. those in the groin (when the sting is on the sole of the foot), or those in the armpit (if the sting is on the hands).

Common and minor symptoms include severe pain, itching, swelling, heat, redness, numbness, tingling, nausea, vomiting, joint aches, headaches, abdominal cramps, lightheadedness, increased urination and tremors.

Rare and severe symptoms include abnormal heart rhythms, weakness, shortness of breath, seizures, decreased blood pressure, gangrene, tissue degeneration and unconsciousness.

The best first aid is to wash the wound, and then to immerse it in very hot water for at least an hour, to ease the pain and help destroy the protein-based venom. Water temperature for immersion should be 40 °C (104 °F) or as hot as the patient can tolerate. Also, reassure the patient of the relative harmlessness of the sting.

== See also ==
- Greater weever
- Weever
