= Myopsaron =

Scientific classification
- Kingdom: Animalia
- Phylum: Chordata
- Class: Actinopterygii
- Division: Teleostei
- Order: Acropomatiformes
- Family: Creediidae
- Genus: Myopsaron
- Species: M. nelsoni

Binomial name
- Myopsaron nelsoni Shibukawa, 2010

Species of ray-finned fish

Myopsaron nelsoni, is a species of sandburrower only known from around the Ogasawara Islands, Japan, where it has been collected at depths of from 51 to 99 metres (167 to 325 ft) over flat, sandy bottoms. This species grows to a length of 3.6 centimetres (1.4 in) SL. This species is the only known member of its genus.
