= Apodocreedia =

Conservation status
- Data Deficient (IUCN 3.1)

Scientific classification
- Kingdom: Animalia
- Phylum: Chordata
- Class: Actinopterygii
- Order: Acropomatiformes
- Family: Creediidae
- Genus: Apodocreedia de Beaufort, 1948
- Species: A. vanderhorsti

Binomial name
- Apodocreedia vanderhorsti de Beaufort, 1948

Genus of ray-finned fishes

Apodocreedia vanderhorsti, the longfin burrower, is a species of sandburrower native to the Indian Ocean coast of southern Africa where it can be found from Delagoa Bay, Mozambique to Durban, South Africa. It occurs from the intertidal zone to a depth of approximately 16 metres (52 ft). This species grows to a length of 8 centimetres (3.1 in) TL. This species is the only known member of the genus Apodocreedia.
