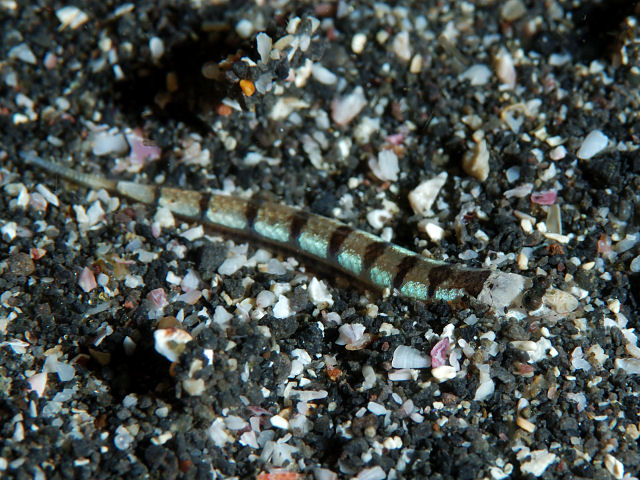

Conservation status
- Least Concern (IUCN 3.1)

Scientific classification
- Kingdom: Animalia
- Phylum: Chordata
- Class: Actinopterygii
- Order: Acropomatiformes
- Family: Creediidae
- Genus: Limnichthys
- Species: L. fasciatus

Binomial name
- Limnichthys fasciatus Waite, 1904

= Limnichthys fasciatus =

Barred sand burrower

Species of ray-finned fish

Limnichthys fasciatus, the barred sand burrower, is a species of sandburrower. It is noted for its highly developed eyes, with a structure similar to the eyes of a chameleon, which has led it to be described as marine chameleon. Its fully grown length measures between 20 millimetres (0.79 in) and 40 millimetres (1.6 in). The species is native to reefs in the Indo-Pacific. The fish preys on plankton prey by surprise attacking it from a hiding in loose sand, with only the eyes protruding from the sand.

== Vision ==
A unique property of this species is its vision. The cornea is 1/7th of the thickness of the entire eye, and has a convex shape due to a lens embedded in the cornea. The cornea can focus, which allows the fish to have depth perception without moving its head. The lens itself is flattened. Its eye is also notable for its high density of retinal ganglion cells compared to other species of fish. Because of the rapid and accurate attack on prey, it is assumed the fish has good eyesight.
