= Guinean weever =

Conservation status
- Least Concern (IUCN 3.1)

Scientific classification
- Kingdom: Animalia
- Phylum: Chordata
- Class: Actinopterygii
- Order: Perciformes
- Family: Trachinidae
- Genus: Trachinus
- Species: T. armatus

Binomial name
- Trachinus armatus Bleeker, 1861

Species of fish

The Guinean weever (Trachinus armatus) is a fish of the family Trachinidae, widespread in the eastern Atlantic along the coasts of Africa from Mauritania to Angola. A marine, tropical, demersal fish, it grows up to 35 centimetres (14 in) length.
