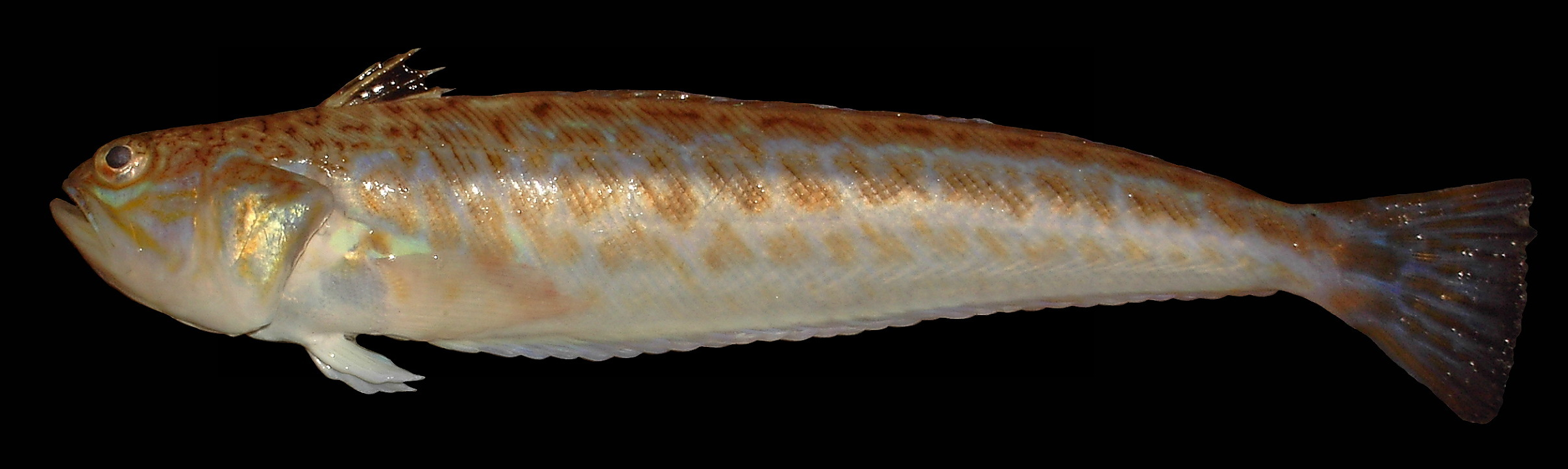

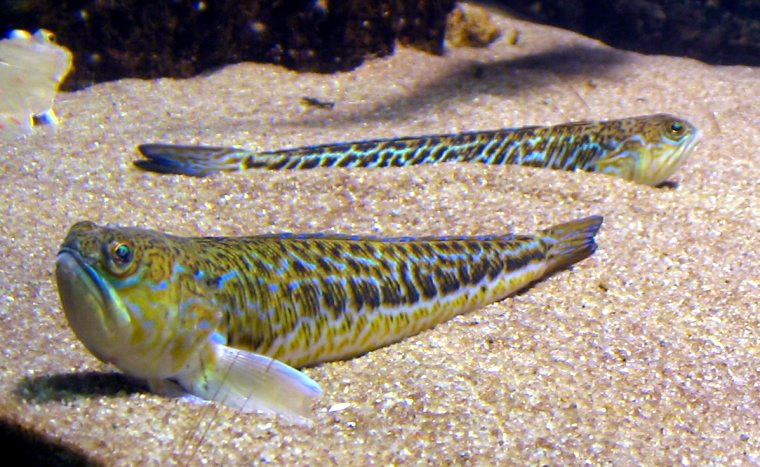

Conservation status
- Least Concern (IUCN 3.1)

Scientific classification
- Kingdom: Animalia
- Phylum: Chordata
- Class: Actinopterygii
- Division: Teleostei
- Order: Perciformes
- Family: Trachinidae
- Genus: Trachinus
- Species: T. draco

Binomial name
- Trachinus draco Linnaeus, 1758

Synonyms
- Trachinus lineatus Bloch & Schneider, 1801

= Greater weever =

Species of fish

The greater weever (Trachinus draco) is a species of marine ray-finned fish in the family Trachinidae. It is a benthic fish widely distributed along the eastern Atlantic coastline (from Norway to Morocco), extending to the Mediterranean, Aegean and Black Seas. The greater weever is mostly and notoriously known for its venomous spines, which can inflict serious injuries on humans through accidental stinging. Because of this, the greater weever is classified as one of the most venomous fishes in the Mediterranean.

== Etymology ==
The term "weever" is thought to originate from the Anglo-Saxon word "wivre", which translates to "viper".

== Description ==
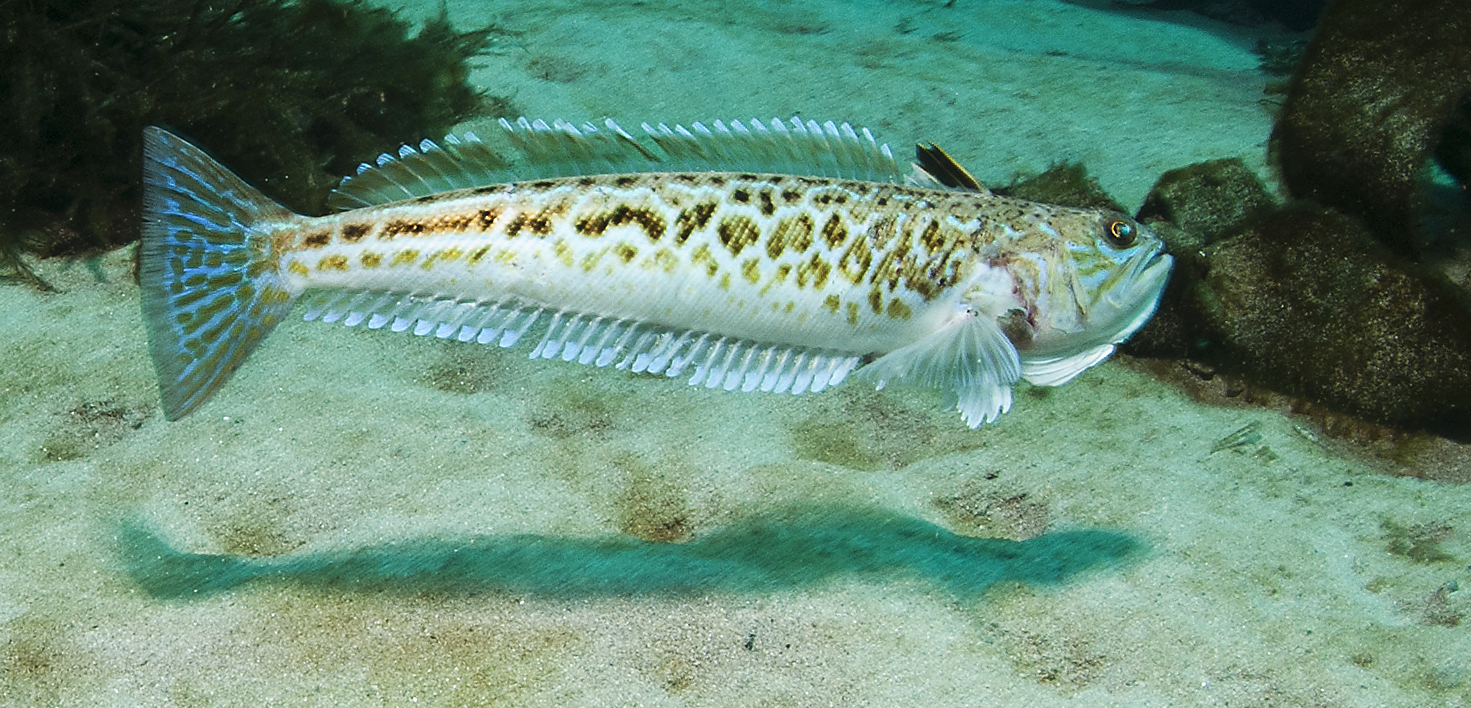
Greater weever

The greater weever is an elongated and laterally flattened fish with a distinct superior mouth that is inclined upwards. The lower jaw is longer than the upper jaw. The head is compact flat and relatively big and the eyes sit almost on top of it. The upper rim of the eye has two to three small spines, in front of each eye. The five to seven spiny fin rays on its first dorsal fin and the thorns on each of the gill covers have venom glands at their basis.

=== Colouration ===
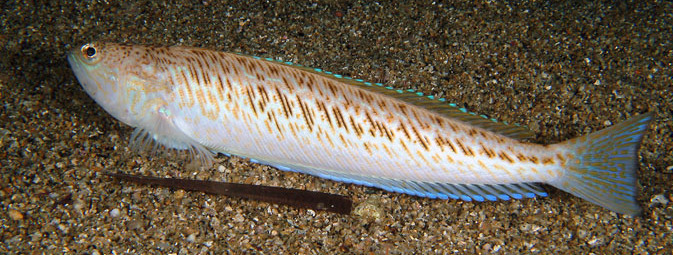
Greater weever

The greater weever is greenish brown with a varying count of dark marks on the upper side of the head. The flank is hued in a yellowish brown with bright blue and yellow discontinuous stripes that run crooked to the front of the fish. Additionally, oblique black stripes can be found laterally (this pattern is described as tiger-like by Müller).

=== Body dimensions ===
The body dimensions of Trachinus draco are described very differently by different authors and seem to differ based on the geographical location where the study has been carried out.

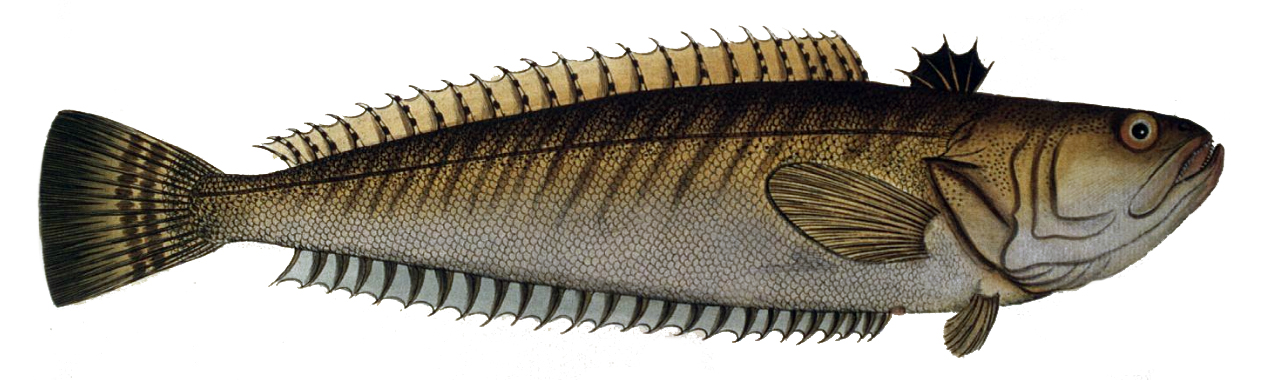
Greater weever

In the Eastern Black Sea, the length distribution of mature fishes ranges from 10 cm (3.9 in) up to a maximum of 25.8 cm (10.2 in) for females and from 9.5 to 22.5 cm (3.7 to 8.9 in) for males. The weight ranges from 6.96 to 131.76 g (0.246 to 4.648 oz) for females and from 5.34 to 75.84 g (0.188 to 2.675 oz) for males. While the largest female recorded in the Eastern Black Sea was 25.8 cm (10.2 in) long, the findings in other studies suggest, that Trachinus draco has a much bigger range in size than that found in this study. In the Algarve Coast of Southern Portugal, the largest female found by Santos et al. had a total maximum length of 39.6 cm (15.6 in). But also in the Black Sea specimens have been observed, that outrange the largest female found by Ak & Genç in 2013. The largest female found by Ak et al. in the Black Sea had a total maximum length of 35 cm (14 in). For Ak & Genç it seems to be clear that many factors contribute to the varying size of Trachinus draco like "temperature, salinity, food (quantity, quality and size), sex, time of year and stage of maturity". The record weight according to the International Game Fish Association is a 1.74 kg (3 lb 13 oz) specimen, caught off La Gomera in the Canary Islands in 2005.

== Ecology and behaviour ==
=== Depth ===
The greater weever has been shown to occur in depths ranging from shallow water up to 150 m (490 ft), where it inhabits mostly muddy or sandy grounds.

=== Diet and feeding behaviour ===
The greater weever is an ambush predator that digs itself into fine sand during daytime, with only its eyes and the tip of the dorsal fin exposed. There it lurks until potential prey approaches, which it then attacks in a swift and sudden manner. At night, the greater weever is believed to swim around freely, even pelagically. This is supported by the finding that prey caught during daytime is already mostly digested by the night of the same day.

As hinted above, the greater weever is a carnivore. According to catches in the Adriatic Sea suggests, it feeds mainly on smaller fish, decapods and opossum shrimps (also known as mysids); in general, these items make up to over 90% of the total relative importance (IRI). The diet contains also isopods, amphipods, cephalopods and bivalves. The most common prey that can be identified to the rank of species are Liocarcinus depurator, Galathea strigosa (both of which are decapods) and Anchialina agilis (a mysid).

The compounds of the diet alters significantly with fish size. While the relatively small mysids are the most common prey for greater weevers under a size of 20 cm (7.9 in), their importance in the diet composition decreases with size, as does the importance of amphipods. On the other hand, the share of cephalopods and fishes increase with size.

The feeding habit of T. draco in the eastern Adriatic Sea differs very little over the year and decapods have been the most common prey through all seasons but peaked through summer and autumn while teleostei consumption peaked in winter. In Danish waters on the other hand Merlangius merlangus and to smaller extent Clupeoides were the main feeding source in the time of winter. The frequency of empty stomachs, in the specimens found in the eastern Adriatic Sea was around 15% in general, but differed significantly through the year. In winter the frequency of empty stomachs was highest, with a maximum at around 43.3% and was lowest in summer with 6.8% and in autumn with 7.8%. These findings were somewhat similar to those in Danish waters. In Kattegat the amount of empty stomachs has been observed in the months of January to April and is described as "very high, close to 100% in some month". Those findings may be due to the lower water temperature of around 12 to 13 °C and the therefore lowered metabolism and feeding activity respectively. Aquarium experiments with stable light, temperature, salinity and sustained food supply on the contrary suggest an endogenous feeding pattern because even under such conditions the fishes refused to eat in the time from January to April and from October to March.

=== Reproduction and spawning behaviour ===
The reproduction period of the greater weever seems to begin in June and last until October. This very broad range is limited by the observations of Ole Bagge (2004), who states that his findings strongly indicate that the spawning time of is indeed restricted to the period between June and August with a peak in July. Bagge also says that there have been no findings of greater weever in spawning condition from September to May.

The greater weever is oviparous and lays its eggs into the pelagic zone. Each egg has a size of about 4.8–6.8 mm (0.19–0.27 in) and hatches after approximately three months; the eggs and larvae can both be found in the pelagic zone and as a part of zooplankton. The eggs may have a need for relatively warm water with a relatively low salinity to hatch in greater numbers.

The greater weever is probably not territorial, even in the mating season, and it has not been observed to carry out any form of parental care.

== Toxicity ==
=== Venomous apparatus ===
The venomous apparatus of T. draco consists of one spine on each operculum and five to eight dorsal spines. The spines on the operculum point towards the cauda, or tail, and are slightly bent downwards. The opercular spines arise from the upper edge of the operculum and are connected to the operculum with one third of their complete length. The other two thirds of their length lies free along the operculum. The total length of the opercular spines is approximately 27 mm. The spine itself is "covered by an integumentary sheath". If this sheath ruptures because there is force applied to the spine, it allows the venom to leak from the venom gland cells and to run through a deep groove along the spine and into the wound caused by the sting. Each of the dorsal spines is covered in an individual integumentary sheet. The spines are connected through a fine interspinous membrane. The spines have different length and are by that arranged in a curve like manner. The spines observed by Russel & Emery (1960) had minimum lengths of 5 mm and maximum lengths of 29 mm and were quite heterogeneous in their appearance on a microscopic level. The dorsal spines are all bent very slightly towards the tail of the fish. The mechanism of envenomation is quite similar to that of the opercular spines.

=== Venom glands ===
The glands producing T. draco's venom are located in the derma of the fish. The venom glands are cased in connective tissue coated with a basal lamina which has a length of 0.1 μm. The venom glands are built up of polygonal cells with a long axis length of 40–50 μm. These cells show a relatively heterogeneous cytoplasm with noticeable large vacuoles and heterogeneous granular (Verdiglione, Mammola, Gargano, & Montesi, 2003). As in the tissue of the lesser weever (Echiichthys vipera) supporting cells can be found in T. draco which develop from epidermal cells. These supporting cells form pockets inside the venom glands which are filled with differentiated glandular cells. The supporting cells most probably play a role in the cohesiveness of the venom gland and in the regeneration of the glandular cells.

=== Toxin ===
The potentially lethal protein component in the crude venom of T. draco is a 105 kDa polypeptide which is called Dracotoxin. The crude venom of T. draco has been shown to have membrane depolarizing and haemolytic characteristics. Those characteristics could be retraced to said single protein component. The depolarisation effect however could not be explained by well-established approaches. Neither does the depolarisation effect take place through Na+ or K+-channels nor through Na+-K+-ATPase activity. The weever sting is often followed by first ischemic and subsequently hyperemic effects in the tissue surrounding the sting. These effects might be related to the high concentrations of histamines and catecholamines found in the venom. While Church & Hodgson (2002) suggest a cholinesterase activity of the toxin itself, Haavaldsen & Fonnum (1963) interpreted their finding of a high concentration of cholinesterase in the venom as a sign for a cholinergic mechanism in the production of the venom because cholinesterase activity hasn't yet been described in the venoms of the animal kingdom. As Russel & Emery (1960) stated, the toxin extract of T. draco has a greyish colour but is clear in its appearance. It is said to have a "fishy taste" and "ammoniacal odor". The pH value of the extract seems to be 6.78 and is with that slightly sour. The toxin of the closely related lesser weever T. vipera has been shown to contain 5-Hydroxy-Triptamine also called Serotonin but in the toxin of T. draco this finding could not be confirmed. The toxicity of the venom was dependent on the way of extraction. The highest toxicity was measured in live fish which were shock frozen and laired in −70 °C-freezers. Under such conditions the minimal lethal dose for mice was 1.8 μg/g while at least 110 mg could be extracted from an average sized fish.

=== Relationship with humans ===
The most common incident regarding humans is strongly connected with T. draco's typical behaviour: burrowing in the sand of shallow waters. Especially in the summer a bather may easily step, jump or fall onto the venomous spines of a buried greater weever. The other occasion where humans are at risk to get stung by T. draco is when fishermen are handling the fish if caught in a net. The venom of the greater weever is best-known for the excruciating pain it provokes a short period of time after the initial sting which can last from a few hours to days. There are in fact cases reported in which victims of a weever sting were still affected by it after a period of 4 months, even if this seems to be a rare scenario. The pain can in some cases reach up to a 10/10 on the numeric rating scale. In a reported case from 1782, a fisherman who had been stung, amputated his own finger to relieve the pain. Even if there are reported cases of fatal accidents with T. draco, it is widely believed that those are due to secondary infections and sepsis rather than to the toxin itself.

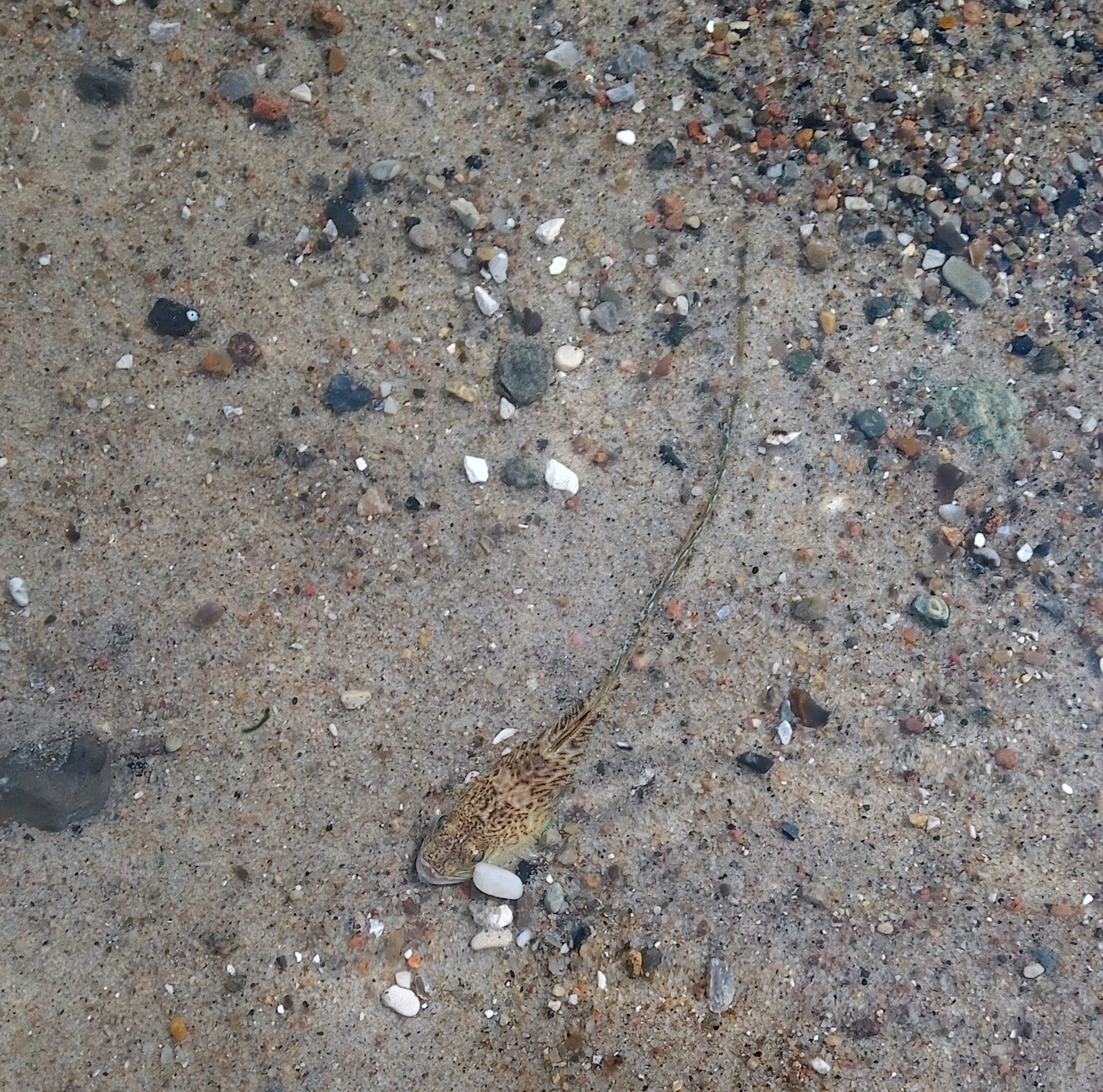
A greater weever, half-buried in the sand in shallow water.

=== Treatment ===
There are many recommended treatments for a sting of the greater weever. These recommendations reach from the application of hot water or vinegar to more arcane methods like fish liver or tobacco juice.

The application of any kind of heat, preferably dousing the affected limb into hot water (40–42 °C) and administering first aid in an attempt to ease the pain, is recommended. It is thereafter prudent to clean the wound and consult a physician, as antibiotics, further analgesics or even a tetanus prophylaxis may be necessary .

== Relationship with humans ==
The greater weever is sold commercially in France, where it is seen as a delicacy, and is often caught as by-catch. It is also commercially available in Spain, where it is often mixed with other by-catch fish (such as gurnards and the annular seabream) and sold collectively under the name of "morralla".
