= Crystallodytes =

Scientific classification
- Domain: Eukaryota
- Kingdom: Animalia
- Phylum: Chordata
- Class: Actinopterygii
- Order: Acropomatiformes
- Family: Creediidae
- Genus: Crystallodytes; Fowler, 1923

Type species
- Crystallodytes cookei Fowler, 1923

Genus of ray-finned fishes

Crystallodytes is a genus of sandburrowers native to the Pacific Ocean.

== Species ==
There are currently three recognized species in this genus:

- Crystallodytes cookei Fowler, 1923 (Cooke's Sandburrower)
- Crystallodytes enderburyensis Schultz, 1943 (South Pacific sandburrower)
- Crystallodytes pauciradiatus J. S. Nelson & J. E. Randall, 1985 (Rapanui sandburrower)
