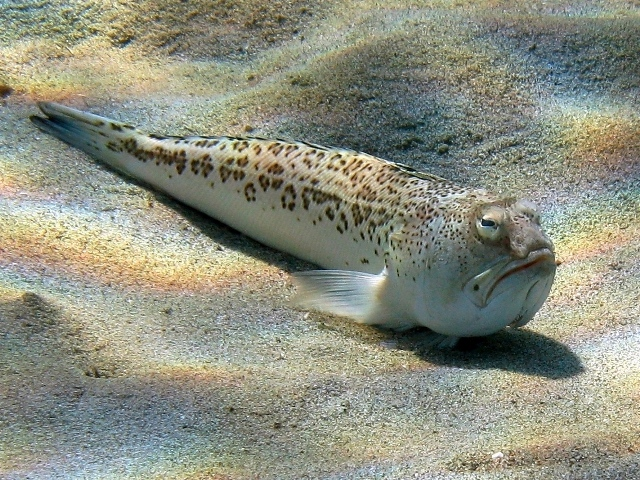
- Starry weever in Kato Koufonisi, Greece

Conservation status
- Least Concern (IUCN 3.1)

Scientific classification
- Kingdom: Animalia
- Phylum: Chordata
- Class: Actinopterygii
- Order: Perciformes
- Family: Trachinidae
- Genus: Trachinus
- Species: T. radiatus

Binomial name
- Trachinus radiatus Cuvier, 1829

Synonyms
- Pseudotrachinus pardalis Bleeker, 1861; Pseudotrachinus radiatus (Cuvier, 1829); Trachinus pardalis (Bleeker, 1861); Trachinus vainus Rafinesque, 1810

= Starry weever =

Species of fish

The starry weever, or streaked weever (Trachinus radiatus) is a fish of the family Trachinidae widespread in the eastern Atlantic from Gibraltar to the Gulf of Guinea, and probably further south; it is also known from the Mediterranean Sea. A marine subtropical fish, it grows up to 50 cm (20 in) in length.

== Description ==
The starry weever is moderately laterally compressed. The eyes are small, the snout is short and blunt, and the operculum bears a robust venomous spine. Five fan-shaped groups of bony ridges are on the top of the head just behind the eye. The dorsal fin is in two parts, the anterior portion has six or seven spines and the posterior portion has no spines, but 24 to 29 soft rays. The anal fin has two spines and 25 to 29 soft rays. This fish can grow to a maximum length around 50 cm (20 in), but a more common length is 25 cm (10 in). The dorsal colouring is generally whitish, yellowish, or grey, sometimes with some violet or pinkish shades on the head and neck. Numerous brownish or blackish speckles are on the back and sides, some, especially on the flanks near the lateral line, forming ring shapes.

== Behaviour ==
Like other members of the weever family, the starry weever lives on the seabed, burying itself in the sediment so that only its eyes and the anterior dorsal fin are above the surface. Poison glands are located at the base of this fin and on the spine on the gill cover. This fish is an ambush predator, remaining stationary in the sand ready to grab any passing prey of suitable size with its wide, upward-pointing mouth. Its diet consists largely of shrimp and other crustaceans, and small fish.
