= Creedia =

Scientific classification
- Domain: Eukaryota
- Kingdom: Animalia
- Phylum: Chordata
- Class: Actinopterygii
- Order: Acropomatiformes
- Family: Creediidae
- Genus: Creedia; J. D. Ogilby, 1898

Type species
- Creedia clathrisquamis J. D. Ogilby, 1898

Genus of ray-finned fishes

Creedia is a genus of sandburrowers native to the Indian and western Pacific oceans.

== Species ==
There are currently four recognized species in this genus:

- Creedia alleni J. S. Nelson, 1983
- Creedia bilineata Shimada & Yoshino, 1987
- Creedia haswelli (E. P. Ramsay, 1881) (Slender sand-diver)
- Creedia partimsquamigera J. S. Nelson, 1983 (Half-scaled sand-diver)
