= Chalixodytes =

Scientific classification
- Domain: Eukaryota
- Kingdom: Animalia
- Phylum: Chordata
- Class: Actinopterygii
- Order: Acropomatiformes
- Family: Creediidae
- Genus: Chalixodytes; L. P. Schultz, 1943

Type species
- Chalixodytes tauensis L. P. Schultz, 1943

Genus of ray-finned fishes

Chalixodytes is a genus of sandburrowers native to the Indian and the Pacific oceans.

== Species ==
There are currently two recognized species in this genus:

- Chalixodytes chameleontoculis J. L. B. Smith, 1957 (Sand dart)
- Chalixodytes tauensis L. P. Schultz, 1943 (Saddled sandburrower)

C. chameleontoculis is regarded by many authorities as a synonym of C. tauensis, which would mean that this genus is monotypic.
