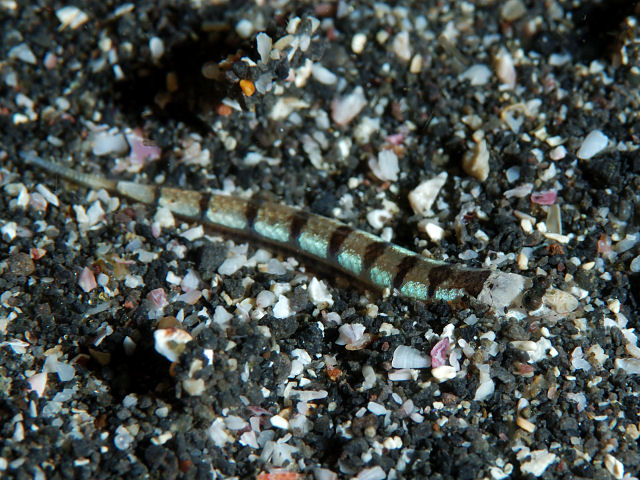
- Limnichthys fasciatus

Scientific classification
- Domain: Eukaryota
- Kingdom: Animalia
- Phylum: Chordata
- Class: Actinopterygii
- Order: Acropomatiformes
- Family: Creediidae
- Genus: Limnichthys; Waite, 1904

Type species
- Limnichthys fasciatus Waite, 1904

= Limnichthys =

Genus of ray-finned fishes

Limnichthys is a genus of sandburrowers native to the Indian and Pacific oceans.

== Species ==
There are currently six recognized species in this genus:

- Limnichthys fasciatus Waite, 1904 (barred sand burrower)
- Limnichthys marisrubri R. Fricke & Golani, 2012
- Limnichthys nitidus J. L. B. Smith, 1958 (sand submarine)
- Limnichthys orientalis Yoshino, Kon & Okabe, 1999
- Limnichthys polyactis J. S. Nelson, 1978 (tommyfish)
- Limnichthys rendahli Parrott, 1958
