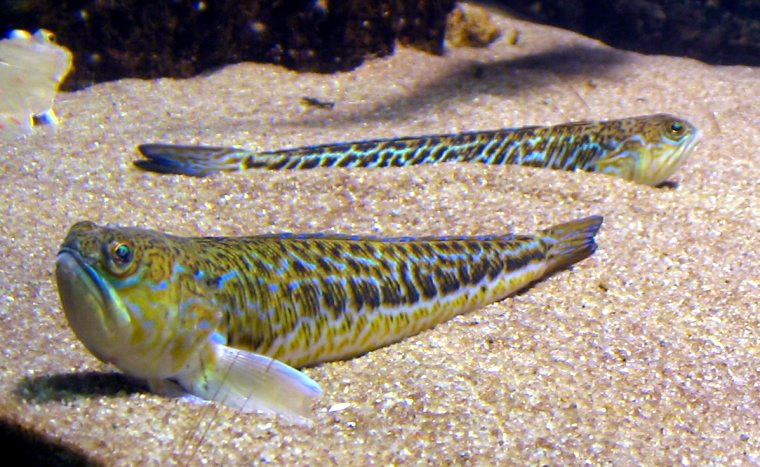
- Trachinus draco

Scientific classification
- Kingdom: Animalia
- Phylum: Chordata
- Class: Actinopterygii
- Division: Teleostei
- Order: Perciformes
- Family: Trachinidae
- Genus: Trachinus; Linnaeus, 1758

Type species
- Trachinus draco Linnaeus, 1758

Synonyms
- Corystion Rafinesque, 1810; Pseudotrachinus Bleeker, 1861

= Trachinus =

Trachinus Temporal range: Oligocene-Holocene

Genus of fishes

Trachinus is a genus of ray-finned fish in the weever family Trachinidae consisting of eight extant species and a few extinct species. All species of the genus inhabit the waters of the eastern Atlantic Ocean with the exception of T. cornutus, which inhabits the southeastern part of the Pacific Ocean. Three of the seven Atlantic species occur near the coasts of Europe.

== Etymology ==
The genus name, given by Linnaeus, is from trachina, which is the Medieval Latin name for the fish. This name is in turn is from the Ancient Greek word τρᾱχύς (trachýs, meaning "rough").

== Species list ==
The eight extant species of the genus are:

- Trachinus araneus Cuvier, 1829 (spotted weever)
- Trachinus armatus Bleeker, 1861 (Guinean weever)
- Trachinus collignoni Roux, 1957 (sailfin weever)
- Trachinus cornutus Guichenot, 1848
- Trachinus draco Linnaeus, 1758 (greater weever)
- Trachinus lineolatus Fischer, 1885 (striped weever)
- Trachinus pellegrini Cadenat, 1937 (Cape Verde weever)
- Trachinus radiatus Cuvier, 1829 (starry weever)

Three extinct species have also been placed in this genus:

- † Trachinus minutus (Jonet, 1958) (Oligocene, Carpathian Mountains)
- † Trachinus dracunculus Heckel, 1849 (Miocene, Piemonte, Italy)
- † Trachinus maroccanus Than-Marchese et al., 2023 (Pliocene, Morocco)

== Sources ==
- Trachinus at FishBase
