= Callipteryx =

Callipteryx Temporal range: Early Eocene

Scientific classification
- Kingdom: Animalia
- Phylum: Chordata
- Class: Actinopterygii
- Order: Perciformes (?)
- Family: †Callipterygidae; Jordan, 1905
- Genus: †Callipteryx; Agassiz, 1838
- Species: †C. speciosus

Binomial name
- †Callipteryx speciosus Agassiz, 1838

Synonyms
- †C. recticaudus Agassiz, 1838

Extinct genus of fishes

Callipteryx is an extinct genus of prehistoric marine percomorph fish that lived during the early Eocene. It is the only known member of the extinct family Callipterygidae. It contains a single species, C. speciosus (=C. recticaudus), known from the famous Monte Bolca site of Italy.

It was initially thought to have been a relative of weeverfishes. However, a more recent analysis suggests that it cannot be classified within any of the known percomorph groups. It may potentially be an indeterminate perciform.

== See also ==
- Prehistoric fish
- List of prehistoric bony fish
