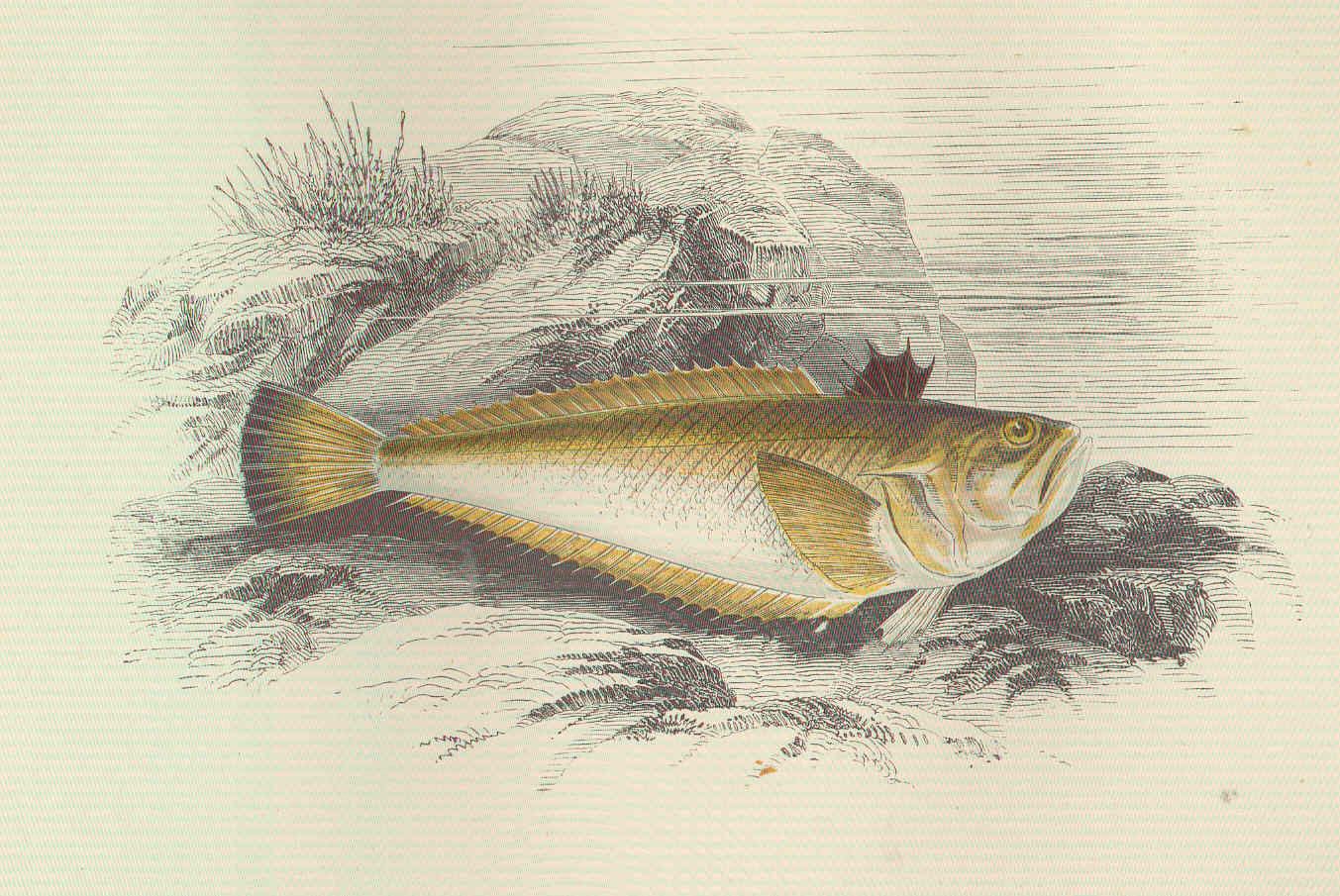
- Lesser weever, Echiichthys vipera

Scientific classification
- Kingdom: Animalia
- Phylum: Chordata
- Class: Actinopterygii
- Division: Teleostei
- Order: Perciformes
- Suborder: Percoidei
- Family: Trachinidae; Rafinesque, 1815

Genera
- Echiichtys; Trachinus; See text for species.

= Weever =

Weevers

Family of ray-finned fishes

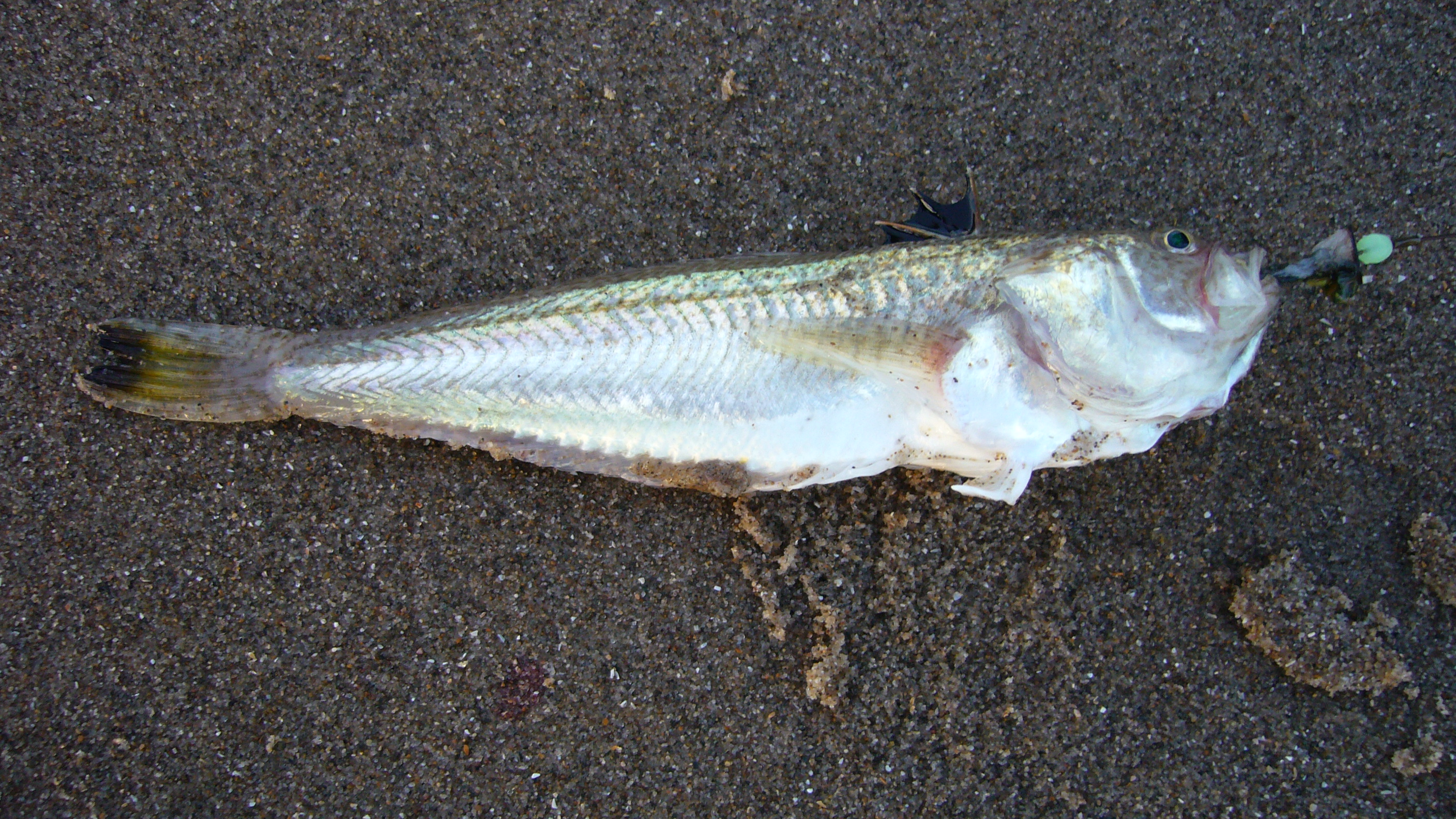
Lesser weever fish, caught from the beach at Prestatyn, North Wales. Note the highly distinctive venomous dorsal spines (separated by almost black skin) and dark-tipped tail.

Weevers (or weeverfish) are nine extant species of ray-finned fishes of the family Trachinidae in the order Perciformes, part of the wider clade Percomorpha. They are long (up to 37 cm), mainly brown in color, and have venomous spines on their first dorsal fin and gills. During the day, weevers bury themselves in sand, just showing their eyes, and snatch prey as it comes past, which consists of shrimp and small fish.

Weevers are unusual in not having swim bladders, as have most bony fish, and as a result sink as soon as they stop actively swimming. With the exception of T. cornutus from the southeast Pacific, all species in this family are restricted to the eastern Atlantic (including the Mediterranean). An extinct relative, Callipteryx, is known from the Monte Bolca lagerstätte of the Lutetian epoch.

Weevers are sometimes used as an ingredient in the recipe for bouillabaisse.

Weevers are sometimes erroneously called 'weaver fish', although the word is unrelated. In fact the word 'weever' is believed to derive from the Old French word wivre, meaning serpent or dragon, from the Latin vipera. It is sometimes also known as the viperfish, although it is not related to the viperfish proper (i.e. the stomiids of the genus Chauliodus).

In Australia sand perches of the family Mugilidae are also known as weevers.

In Portugal and Spain the weever is known spider-fish or spider (peixe-aranha, in Portuguese; araña, in Spanish; aranya, in Catalan).

== Species ==
The 9 extant species in two genera are:

- Genus Echiichthys
  - Lesser weever, E. vipera (Cuvier, 1829)
- Genus Trachinus
  - Spotted weever, T. araneus Cuvier, 1829
  - Guinean weever, T. armatus Bleeker, 1861
  - Sailfin weever, T. collignoni Roux, 1957
  - Trachinus cornutus Guichenot, 1848.
  - Greater weever, T. draco Linnaeus, 1758
  - Striped weever, T. lineolatus Fischer, 1885
  - Cape Verde weever, T. pellegrini Cadenat, 1937
  - Starry weever, T. radiatus Cuvier, 1829

== Interaction with humans ==
=== Stings: causes, frequency and prevention ===
Most human stings are inflicted by the lesser weever, which habitually remains buried in sandy areas of shallow water and is thus more likely to come into contact with bathers than other species (such as the greater weever, which prefers deeper water); stings from other species are generally limited to anglers and commercial fishermen. Even very shallow water (sometimes little more than damp sand) may harbour lesser weevers. The vast majority of injuries occur to the foot and are the result of stepping on buried fish; other common sites of injury are the hands and buttocks.

Stings are most common in the hours before and after low tide (especially at springs), so one possible precaution is to avoid bathing or paddling at these times. Weever stings have been known to penetrate wet suit boots even through a rubber sole (if thin), and bathers and surfers should wear sandals, "jelly shoes", or wetsuit boots with relatively hard soles, and avoid sitting or "rolling" in the shallows. Stings also increase in frequency during the summer (to a maximum in August), but this is probably the result of the greater number of bathers.

The lesser weever can be found from the southern North Sea to the Mediterranean, and is common around the south coast of the United Kingdom and Ireland, the Atlantic coast of France, Portugal and Spain, and the northern coast of the Mediterranean. The high number of bathers found on popular tourist beaches in these areas means stings are common, although individual chances of being stung are low. The South Wales Evening Post stated (on 8 August 2000) that around 40 weever stings are recorded in the Swansea and Gower area every year, but many victims do not seek medical assistance and go uncounted.

=== Symptoms ===
At first many victims believe they have simply scratched themselves on a sharp stone or shell, although this barely hurts; significant pain begins 2–3 minutes afterwards. Weever stings cause severe pain; common descriptions from victims are "extremely painful" and "much worse than a wasp (or bee) sting".

Common and minor symptoms include severe pain, itching, swelling, heat, redness, numbness, tingling, nausea, vomiting, joint aches, headaches, abdominal cramps, lightheadedness, increased urination and tremors.

Rare and severe symptoms include abnormal heart rhythms, weakness, shortness of breath, seizures, decreased blood pressure, gangrene, tissue degeneration and unconsciousness.

=== Treatment ===
Although extremely unpleasant, weever stings are not generally dangerous and the pain will ease considerably within a few hours even if untreated. Complete recovery may take a week or more; in a few cases, victims have reported swelling and/or stiffness persisting for months after envenomation.

First aid treatment consists of immersing the affected area in hot water (as hot as the victim can tolerate without being scalded), which will accelerate denaturation of the protein-based venom. The use of hot water will reduce the pain felt by the victim after a few minutes. Usual experience is that the pain then fades within 10 to 20 minutes, as the water cools. Folklore often suggests the addition of substances to the hot water, including urine, vinegar, and Epsom salts, but this is of limited or no value. Heat should be applied for at least 15 minutes, but the longer the delay (before heat is applied), the longer the treatment should be continued. Once the pain has eased, the injury should be checked for the remains of broken spines, and any found need to be removed. Over-the-counter analgesics, such as aspirin or ibuprofen, may be of assistance in management of pain and can also reduce edema.

Medical advice should be sought if any of the symptoms listed above as rare or severe are observed, if swelling spreads beyond the immediate area of injury (e.g. from hand to arm), if symptoms persist, or if any other factor causes concern. Medical treatment consists of symptom management, analgesia (often with opiates) and the same heat treatment as for first aid - more systemic treatment using histamine antagonists may assist in reducing local inflammation.

=== Fatalities ===
The only recorded death in the UK occurred in 1933, when a fisherman off Dungeness suffered multiple stings. The victim may have died of other medical causes exacerbated by the stings.
