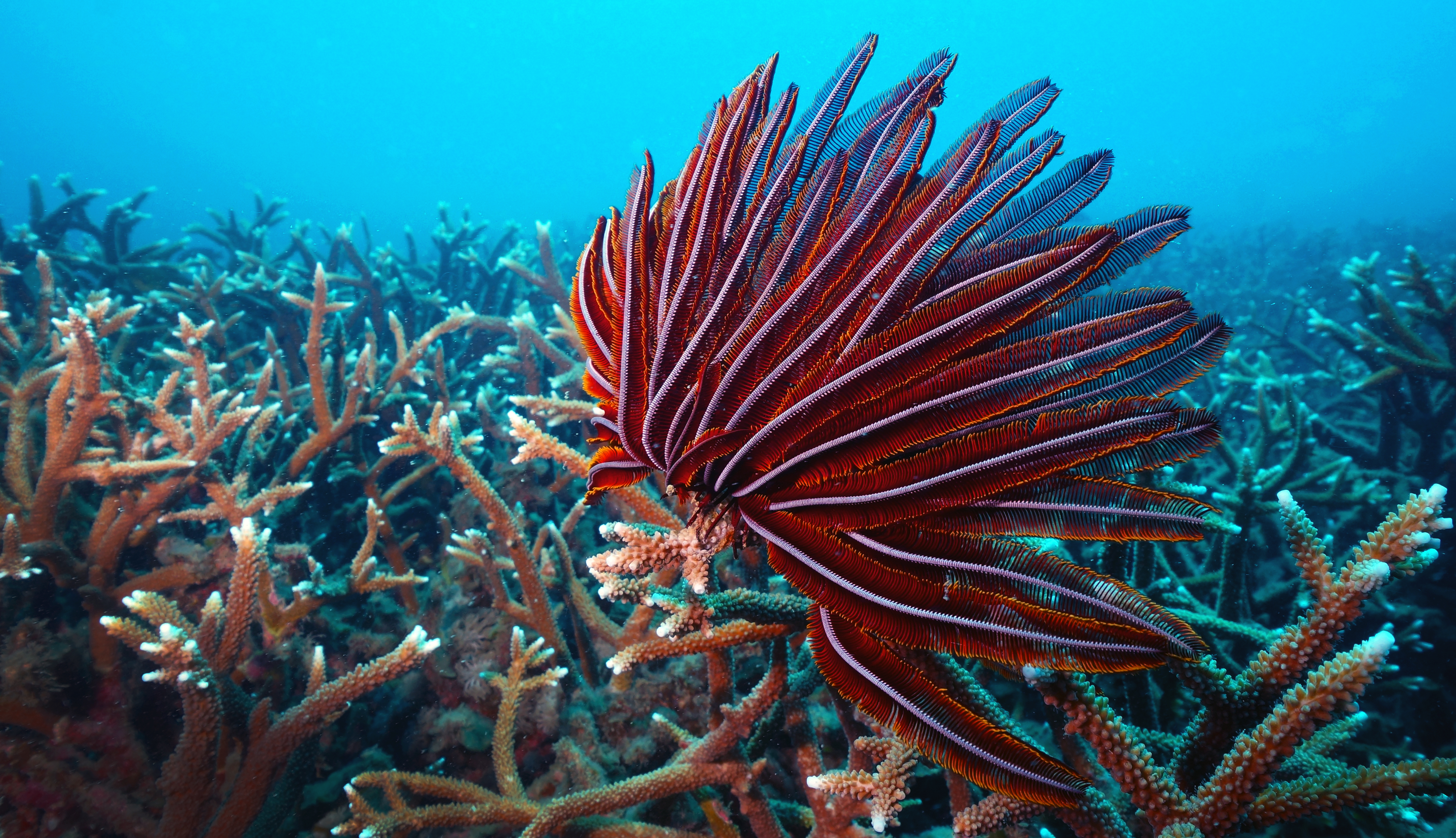
- Himerometra robustipinna

Scientific classification
- Kingdom: Animalia
- Phylum: Echinodermata
- Class: Crinoidea
- Superorder: Articulata
- Order: Comatulida
- Superfamily: Himerometroidea
- Family: Himerometridae; A.H. Clark, 1907

= Himerometridae =

Family of echinoderms

Himerometridae is a family of echinoderms belonging to the order Comatulida.

Genera:

- Amphimetra Clark, 1909
- Craspedometra Clark, 1909
- Heterometra Clark, 1909
- Himerometra Clark, 1907
- Homalometra Clark, 1918
