= Trachinus cornutus =

Scientific classification
- Kingdom: Animalia
- Phylum: Chordata
- Class: Actinopterygii
- Order: Perciformes
- Family: Trachinidae
- Genus: Trachinus
- Species: T. cornutus

Binomial name
- Trachinus cornutus Guichenot, 1848

Species of fish

Trachinus cornutus is a species of weeverfish. Unlike all other extent weevers, which are found in the Eastern Atlantic and Mediterranean Sea, T. cornutus is widespread in the southeastern Pacific along the coasts of Chile, it is a marine subtropical demersal fish.
