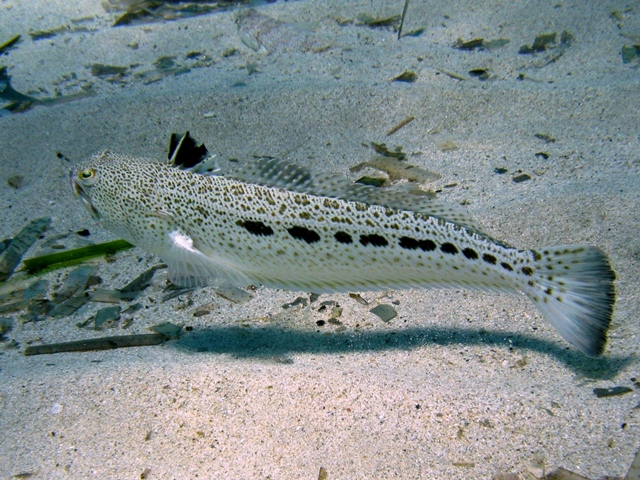

Conservation status
- Least Concern (IUCN 3.1)

Scientific classification
- Kingdom: Animalia
- Phylum: Chordata
- Class: Actinopterygii
- Order: Perciformes
- Family: Trachinidae
- Genus: Trachinus
- Species: T. araneus

Binomial name
- Trachinus araneus Cuvier, 1829

= Spotted weever =

Species of fish

The spotted weever (Trachinus araneus) is a fish of the family Trachinidae, order Perciformes, and class Actinopterygii.

It is up to 45 cm long, brown and yellow on the head and back, paler below with darker spots along the sides. The body is long and laterally flattened, the mouth almost vertical in the head. The front half of the first dorsal fin is black and consists of three spines, which are highly poisonous, as are the backward-facing spines on the extremities of the gill covers.

The spotted weever lives close to the bottom down to about 100 m. It prefers a subtropical climate; the coordinates are 45°N - 18°S, 19°W -36°E.

The spotted weever can be found from Portugal to Angola and the Mediterranean. It is of minor commercial importance. It inhabits the shallow waters to about 100m depth near rocks and sea grass nearby, burrowing in the bottom. Just as other weevers, it feeds on small fish and crustaceans.
