= Tropical fish =

Fish found in aquatic tropical environments

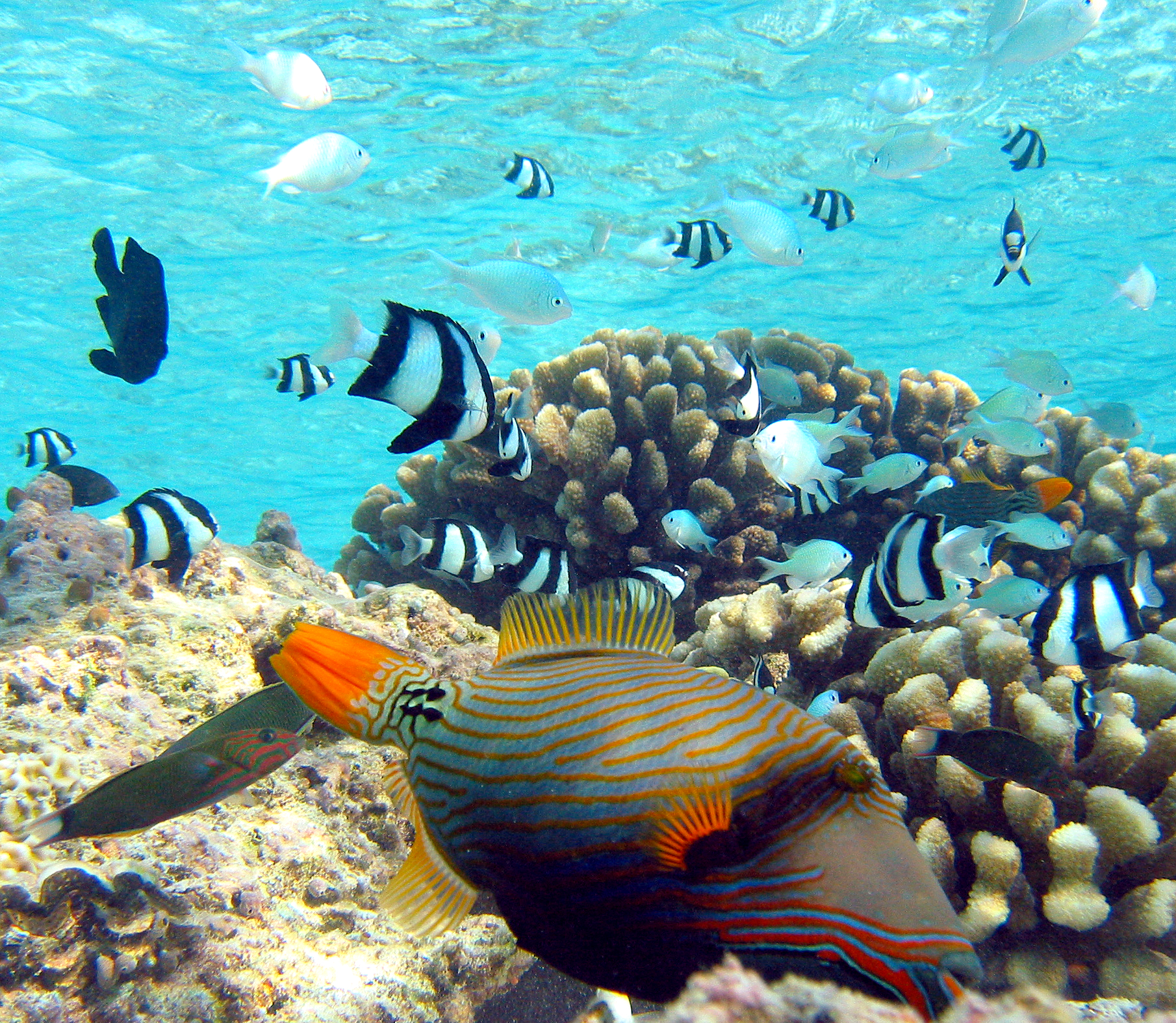
Many tropical fish are coral reef fish

Tropical fish are fish found in aquatic tropical environments around the world. Fishkeepers often keep tropical fish in freshwater and saltwater aquariums. The term "tropical fish" is not a taxonomic group, but rather is a general term for fish found in such environments, particularly those kept in aquariums.

== Aquarium fish ==
Tropical fish is a term commonly used to refer to fish that are kept in heated aquariums. Freshwater tropical fish are more commonly kept than saltwater tropical fish due to the common availability of fresh water sources, such as tap water, whereas salt water is not commonly available and has to be recreated by using fresh water with sea salt additions. Salt water has to be monitored to maintain the correct salinity because of the effects of evaporation. Freshwater tropical aquariums can be maintained by simply topping up with fresh water. Tropical fish are popular choices for aquariums due to their often bright coloration, which typically derives from both pigmented cells and iridescent cells. Tropical fish may include wild-caught specimens, individuals born in captivity including lines selectively bred for special physical features, such as long fins, or particular colorations, such as albino. Some fish may be hybrids of more than one species.

== Freshwater tropical fish ==
Most fish that are sold as tropical fish are freshwater species. Most species available are generally bred from fish farms in Asia and Florida where tropical temperatures make the commercial production more viable. Mass production of tropical fish from farms has led to many inexpensive fish available to aquarists. Tropical freshwater fish are the most popular group of fish because of the low price and ease of keeping in aquaria. Some species are difficult to breed in captivity and so are still sourced from the wild. These species are generally more expensive. Among the bred-in-captivity species, the most expensive freshwater species include arowanas and flowerhorn cichlids. Some male flowerhorns are sterile due to many cross breedings.

== Saltwater tropical fish ==
Marine fish that are sold as tropical fish are generally sourced from the wild, usually from the coral reefs around the world. This is because only a few species of marine fish have been successfully bred in captivity with any regularity. The price of marine fish coupled with the difficulty in keeping them alive in aquaria makes them less of a popular choice for aquarists to keep. However, because of the more vivid colours, patterns and behaviour of marine fish compared to freshwater fish, they are still reasonably popular. The advances in filtration technology and increase in available knowledge on how to maintain marine fish as well as the increasing number of aquarium-bred species is seeing a gradual rise in their popularity.

== Coral reef tropical fish ==
Many marine tropical fish, particularly those of interest to fishkeepers, are those that live among or in close relation to coral reefs. Coral reefs form complex ecosystems with tremendous biodiversity. Among ocean inhabitants, tropical fish stand out as particularly colorful. Hundreds of species can exist in a small area of a healthy reef, many of them hidden or well camouflaged. Reef fish have developed many ingenious specialisations adapted to survival on the reefs.

Some recreational scuba divers keep lists of fish species they have observed while diving, especially in tropical marine environments.

Coral reefs occupy less than 1% of the surface area of the world oceans, yet they provide a home for 25% of all marine fish species. Reef habitats are a sharp contrast to the open water habitats that make up the other 99% of the world's oceans.

However, loss and degradation of coral reef habitat, increasing pollution, and overfishing including the use of destructive fishing practices, are threatening the survival of the coral reefs and the associated reef fish.
