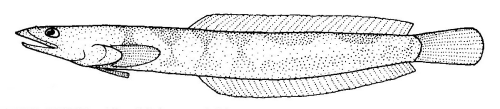
- New Zealand sand diver, Tewara cranwellae Drawing by Dr Tony Ayling

Scientific classification
- Domain: Eukaryota
- Kingdom: Animalia
- Phylum: Chordata
- Class: Actinopterygii
- Order: Acropomatiformes
- Family: Creediidae; Waite, 1899

Genera
- Apodocreedia; Chalixodytes; Creedia; Crystallodytes; Limnichthys; Myopsaron; Schizochirus; Tewara

Synonyms
- Limnichthyidae Regan, 1913

= Sandburrower =

Sandburrowers

Family of ray-finned fishes

The sandburrowers or simply burrowers are a family, Creediidae, of ray-finned fishes in the order Acropomatiformes.

They are native to coastal waters the Indian and Pacific Oceans. They are very small fishes; with the exception of the larger Donaldson's sandburrower, Limnichthys donaldsoni, most species reach only 3 to 7 cm in length. They live in shallow waters close to the shore, burrowing into sandy areas swept by currents or by surf.

== See also ==
- List of fish families
