= Bass (fish) =

Name of various types of fish

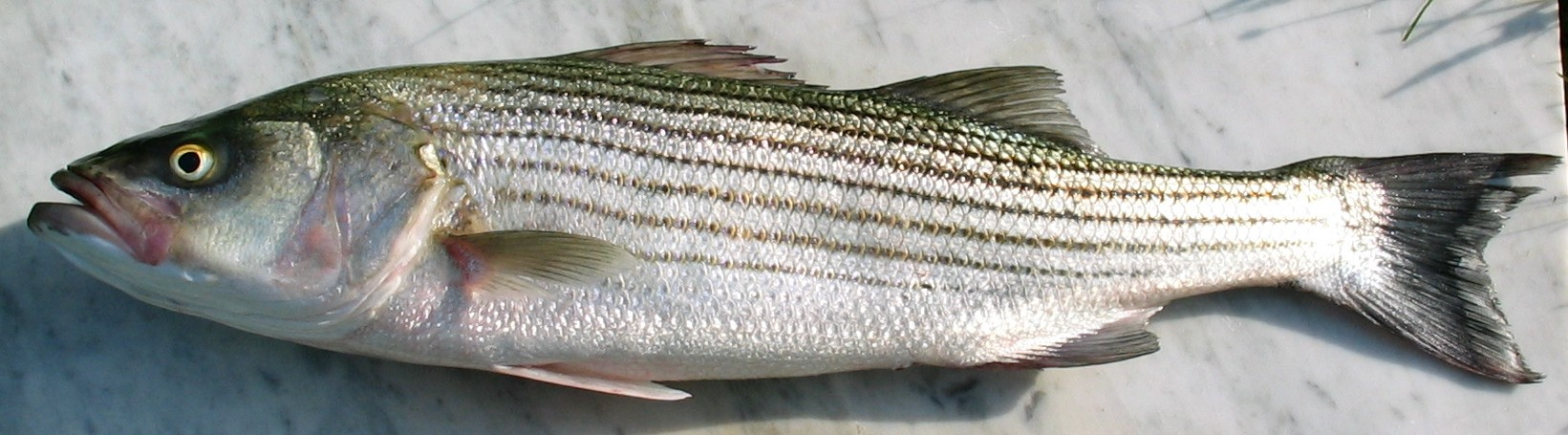
Striped bass (Morone saxatilis)

Bass (/bæs/;pl.: bass) is a common name shared by many species of ray-finned fish from the large clade Percomorpha, mainly belonging to the orders Perciformes and Moroniformes, encompassing both freshwater and marine species. The word bass comes from Middle English bars, meaning "perch", despite that none of the commonly referred bass species belong to the perch family Percidae.

== Common types ==
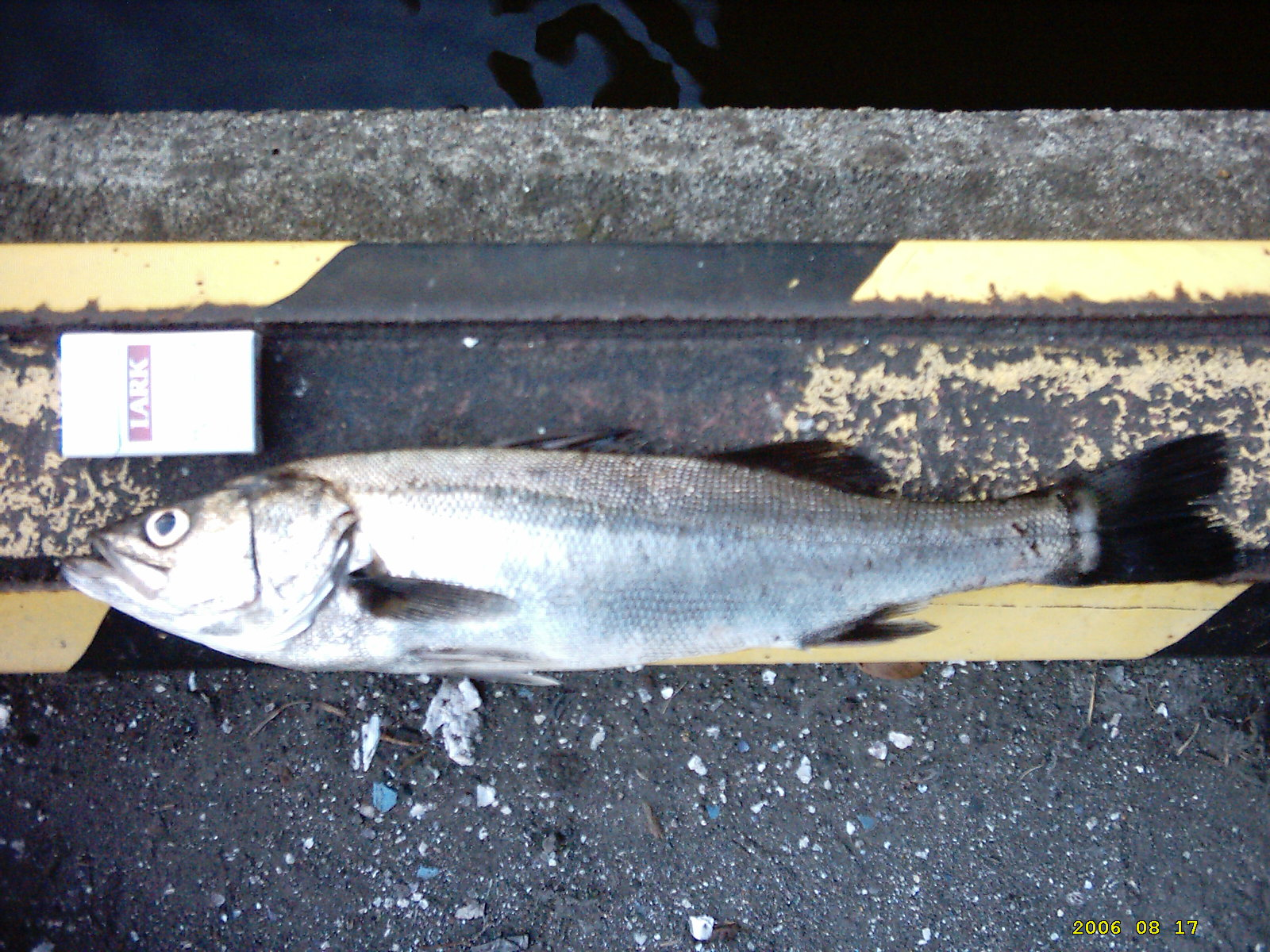
Lateolabrax japonicus

- The black basses, such as the Choctaw bass (Micropterus haiaka), Guadalupe bass (M. treculii), largemouth bass (M. nigricans), Florida bass (M. salmoides), smallmouth bass (M. dolomieu), and spotted bass (M. punctulatus), belong to the genus Micropterus of the sunfish family Centrarchidae.
- The temperate basses, such as the European seabass/branzino (Dicentrarchus labrax), striped bass (Morone saxatilis), yellow bass (M. mississippiensis) and white bass (M. chrysops), belong to the two extant genera Dicentrarchus and Morone of the family Moronidae.
- The Asian seabasses, such as the Japanese seabass (Lateolabrax japonicus) and blackfin seabass (L. latus), belong to the genus Lateolabrax of the family Lateolabracidae.

== Other species known as bass ==
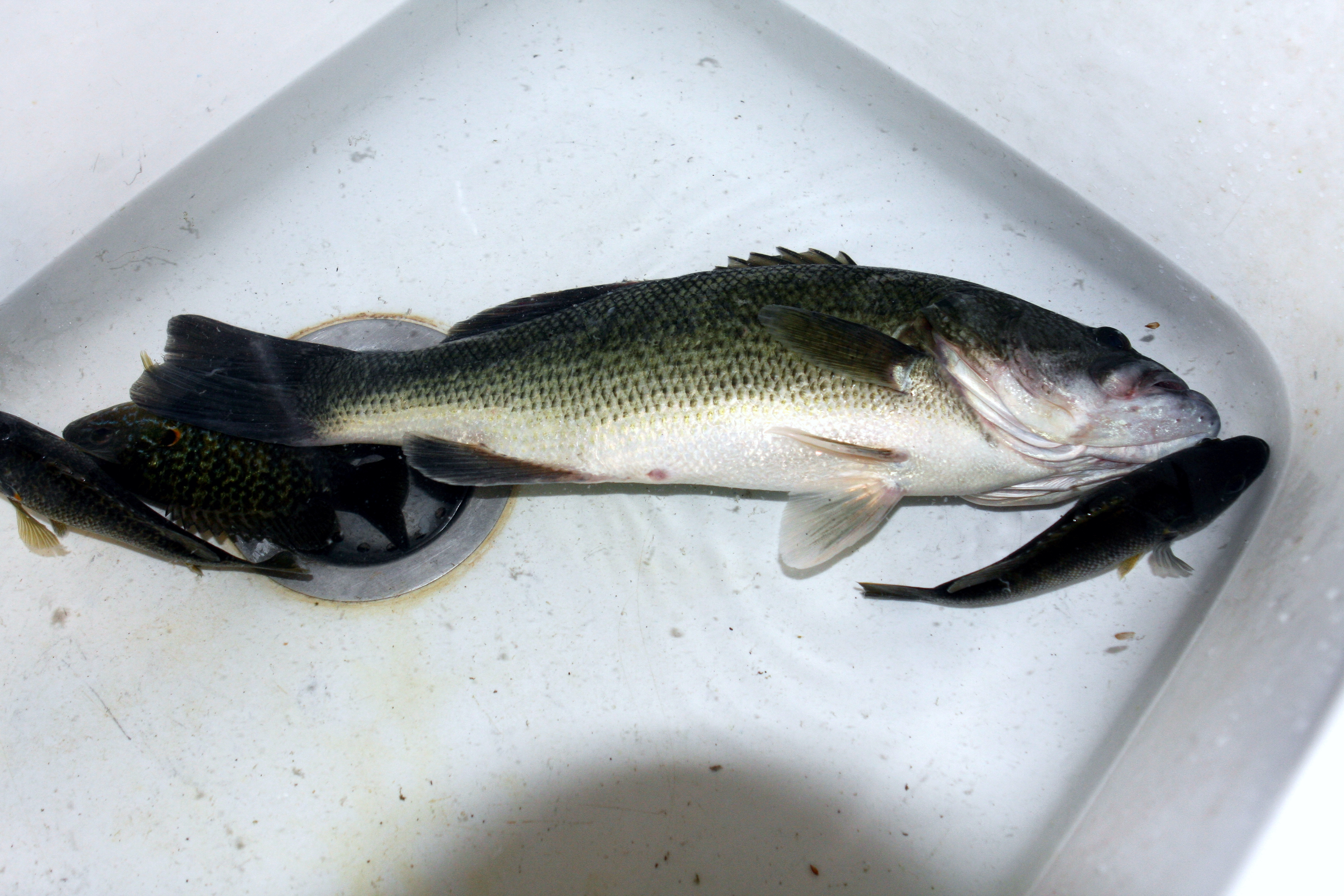
Micropterus salmoides — largemouth bass with assorted sunfish

Many species are also known as basses, including:

=== Order Centrarchiformes ===
- The Australian bass, Percalates novemaculeatus, a member of the temperate perch family Percichthyidae.
- The rock bass (Ambloplites rupestris), and all fish in the genus Ambloplites (shadow bass A. ariommus, Roanoke bass A. cavifrons, and the Ozark bass A. constellatus). They reside in the sunfish family Centrarchidae, along with the black basses.

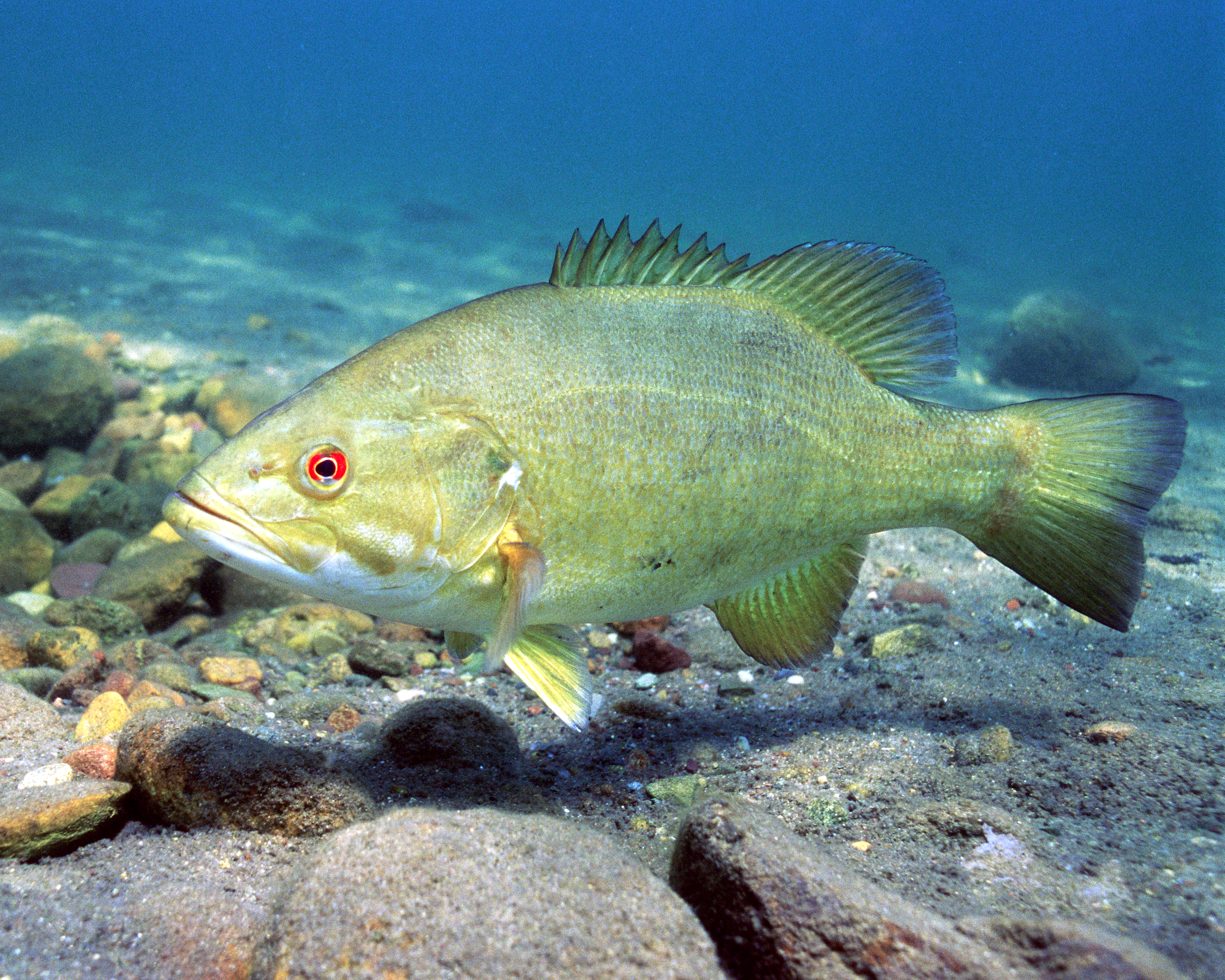
"Micropterus dolomieu" — smallmouth bass.

=== Oceanic basses, order Acropmatiformes ===
- The giant sea bass Stereolepis gigas, also known as the giant black sea bass. They are related to the wreckfish family Polyprionidae, in which Atlantic wreckfish (Polyprion americanus) can be called stone bass or bass groper.
- Malakichthyidae, the temperate ocean-basses, such as the Grape-eye seabass (Hemilutjanus macrophthalmos).
  - Malakichthyidae was previously merged with Acropmatidae, the laternbellies, which still includes the rosy seabass, or blackthroat seaperch (Doederleinia berycoides).
  - Multiple species in the genus Malakichthys
- Family Howellidae, the oceanic basslets
- Family Synagropidae, the splitfin ocean-basses
- This order includes the Asian seabasses mentioned above

=== The suborder Percoidei, or order Perciformes, the perches, groupers and allies ===
- Family Serranidae, the sea basses and basslets
  - Genus Centropristis, composing of black sea bass, Centropristis striata, bank sea bass C. ocyurus, and rock sea bass C. philadelphica.
  - The rock basses of the genus Paralabrax in the Eastern Pacific from California to Chile. This includes the kelp/calico bass (Paralabrax clathratus), barred sand bass (P. nebulifer), and spotted sand bass (P. maculatofasciatus), which are popular gamefish in California.
  - Serranus, the dwarf sea basses and combers.
- Several fish in the family Anthiadidae, the Anthias, fairy basslets, or streamer basses.
- Family Liopropomatidae, the painted basslets.
- Some species of grouper and hind (family Epinephelidae), formerly under Serranidae, are sometimes called bass.
  - Leather bass (Dermatolepis dermatolepis)
- Family Dinopercidae, the cavebasses.
  - Cavebass, or lampfish (Dinoperca petersi)
  - Chapin's Barred Seabass (Centrarchops atlanticus)

=== Other ===
- The Chilean sea bass, Dissostichus eleginoides, also known as the Patagonian toothfish, is a member of the cod icefish family Nototheniidae.
- White seabass (Atractoscion nobilis), a member of the drums/croakers Sciaenidae.
  - Another member of this family, the red drum (Sciaenops ocellatus), may also be known as the spottail bass.
- The butterfly peacock bass, Cichla ocellaris, is a member of the cichlid family, Cichlidae. They are prized game fish along with its relatives in the genus Cichla (many of which are also named peacock bass), such as the similarly popular speckled peacock bass (C. temensis).
- Family Latidae, the lates perches.
  - Black Sand Bass (Psammoperca datnioides)
  - The spikey bass (Hypopterus macropterus)
- Basslets or fairy basslets in the family Grammatidae.
- Red bass or two-spot red snapper Lutjanus bohar, along with some other snappers of the family Lutjanidae.

== Fishing (Black Basses) ==
Largemouth, smallmouth, and spotted bass are the most popular game fish in North America. Appearing commonly in 33 states.

Bass fishing is also very popular in South Africa, Japan, and Cuba, in other areas where the fish are introduced. They are often found in lakes, rivers, creeks, and near dams.

When fishing, lures (bass worms), live bait, spinner baits, jig bait, jerkbait and crank bait will work well. Lures that mimic baitfish, worms, crayfish, frogs, and mice are all effective. Fishing with a small mepps or rooster tail in-line spinner is very effective for creek fishing, when bass are scouting for small baitfish. In open water, lures that cover the water quickly such as spoons, spinners and lipless crankbaits.

During the fall and winter months, bass will be less active and eat less. In this situation, one can fish with suspending lures or slow lures like ned rig, suspending jerkbaits. In the summertime, one can throw lures that float or sink 2–4ft since bass come to shallow areas and prefer faster lures. One of the better times to fish for bass is spawning season as they are on shallower parts of the water as well with being more aggressive towards anything near its eggs. Depending on weather conditions it causes the fish to move to different spots of water, With harsh sunlight and extreme cold they go deeper in the water whereas cooler temperatures they go to the shallow areas.
