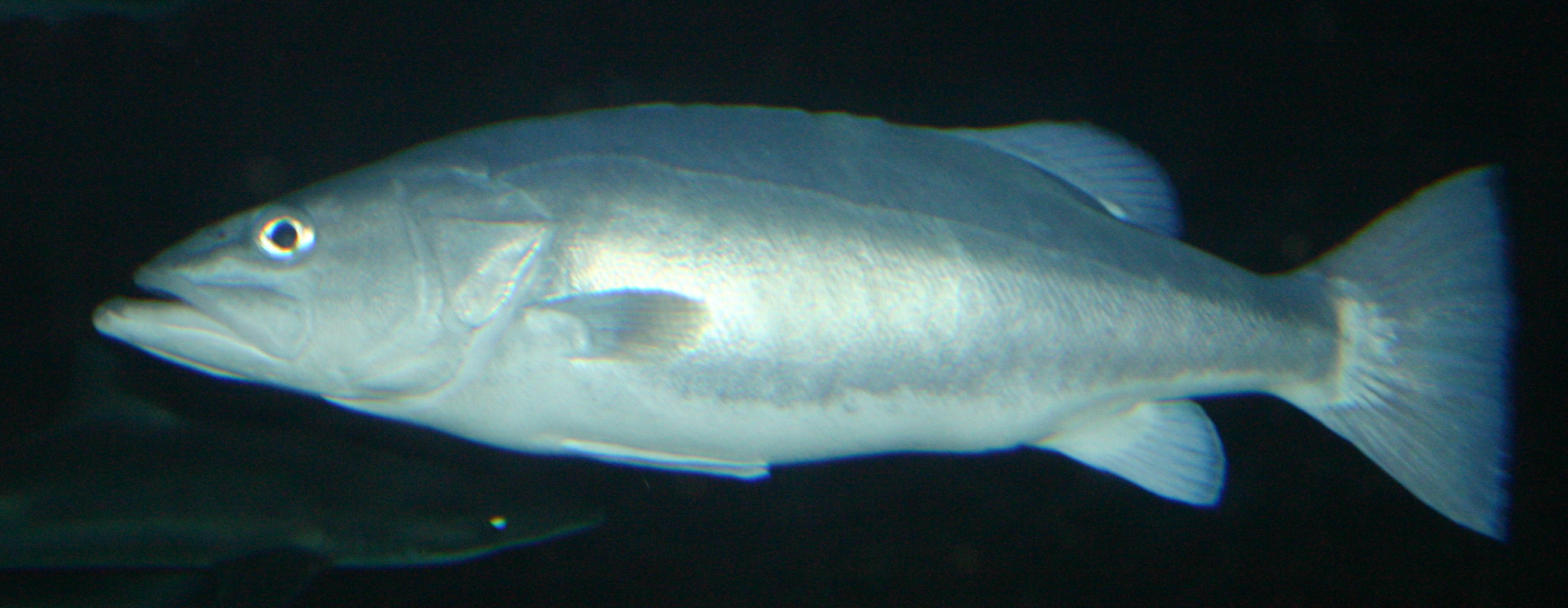
- Hāpuku from Kelly Tarlton's Sea Life Aquarium, Auckland.

Scientific classification
- Kingdom: Animalia
- Phylum: Chordata
- Class: Actinopterygii
- Division: Teleostei
- Order: Acropomatiformes
- Family: Polyprionidae
- Genus: Polyprion
- Species: P. oxygeneios

Binomial name
- Polyprion oxygeneios (Schneider & Forster, 1801)

Synonyms
- Epinephelus oxygeneios Schneider & Forster, 1801; Perca prognatha Forster, 1801; Polyprion prognathus (Forster, 1801); Polyprion knerii Steindachner, 1875; Polyprion yanezi de Buen, 1959

= Hāpuku =

Species of fish

The hāpuku, hapuka or whapuku (Polyprion oxygeneios), also known as groper, is a wreckfish of the family Polyprionidae, found around southern Australia, southern South America, South Africa, Tristan da Cunha and New Zealand at depths between 30 and 800 m. Its length is between 60 and 180 cm, and it can weigh up to 100 kg. It is sometimes described locally as cod, although that properly refers to other fish.

== Description ==
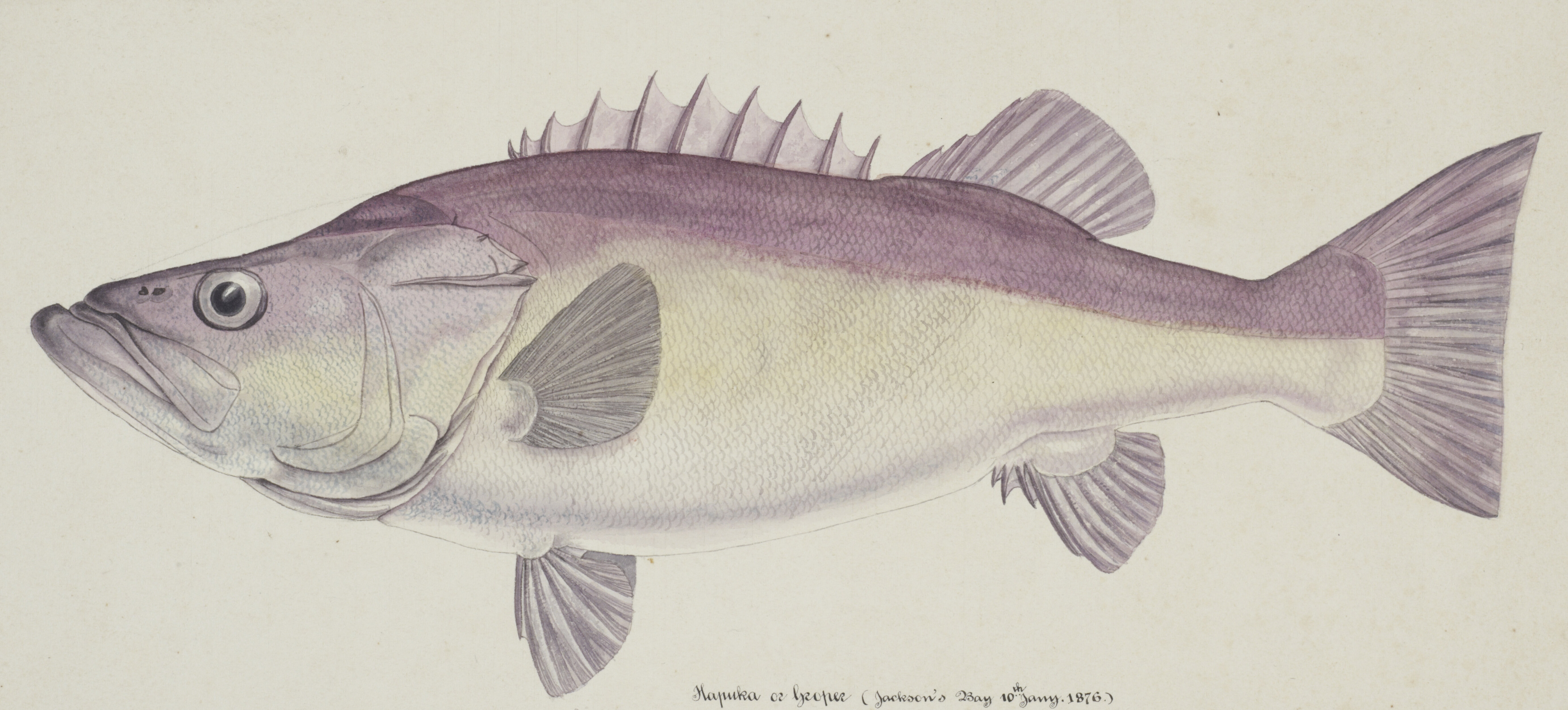
Polyprion oxygeneios by Frank Edward Clarke

Hāpuku are grey in colour with silvery white underbellies, with juveniles generally being blue in colour. They have 10 dorsal spines running along their back, a rounded anal fin and rounded pectoral fins, and a large, powerful, square-shaped tail. Its lower jaw protrudes from the top, and their very large eyes are adapted for hunting and inhabiting low-light conditions.

=== Habitat and feeding ===
Juveniles are thought to be pelagic, switching to demersal when they are about 50 cm in length. They inhabit temperate and subtropical waters of the southern Indian Ocean and Pacific Ocean, being found in Chile, southeastern Australia and New Zealand. They can be found in waters between 10 m and 800 m deep, but generally prefer waters deeper than 50 m. They are usually found living in cracks, caverns, or caves when found in shallow waters. They are voracious predators, feeding on a large range of other fish species, invertebrates and crustaceans, including red cod and blue cod, hoki, crabs and crayfish. The fish has an overlapping range with the Atlantic wreckfish, its closest known relative.

In the 19th century, the fish was found around the shores of New Zealand, but by the 20th century it was found almost exclusively in deeper waters.

=== Age and growth ===
Hāpuku are a large, slow growing, long-lived species. They reach sexual maturity between 10 and 13 years and have lifespans up to 60 years. They can grow as large as 100 kg, but are usually found around the 25 kg mark. They have an average size of 80–100 cm but can grow up to 180 cm in length.

== In a human context ==
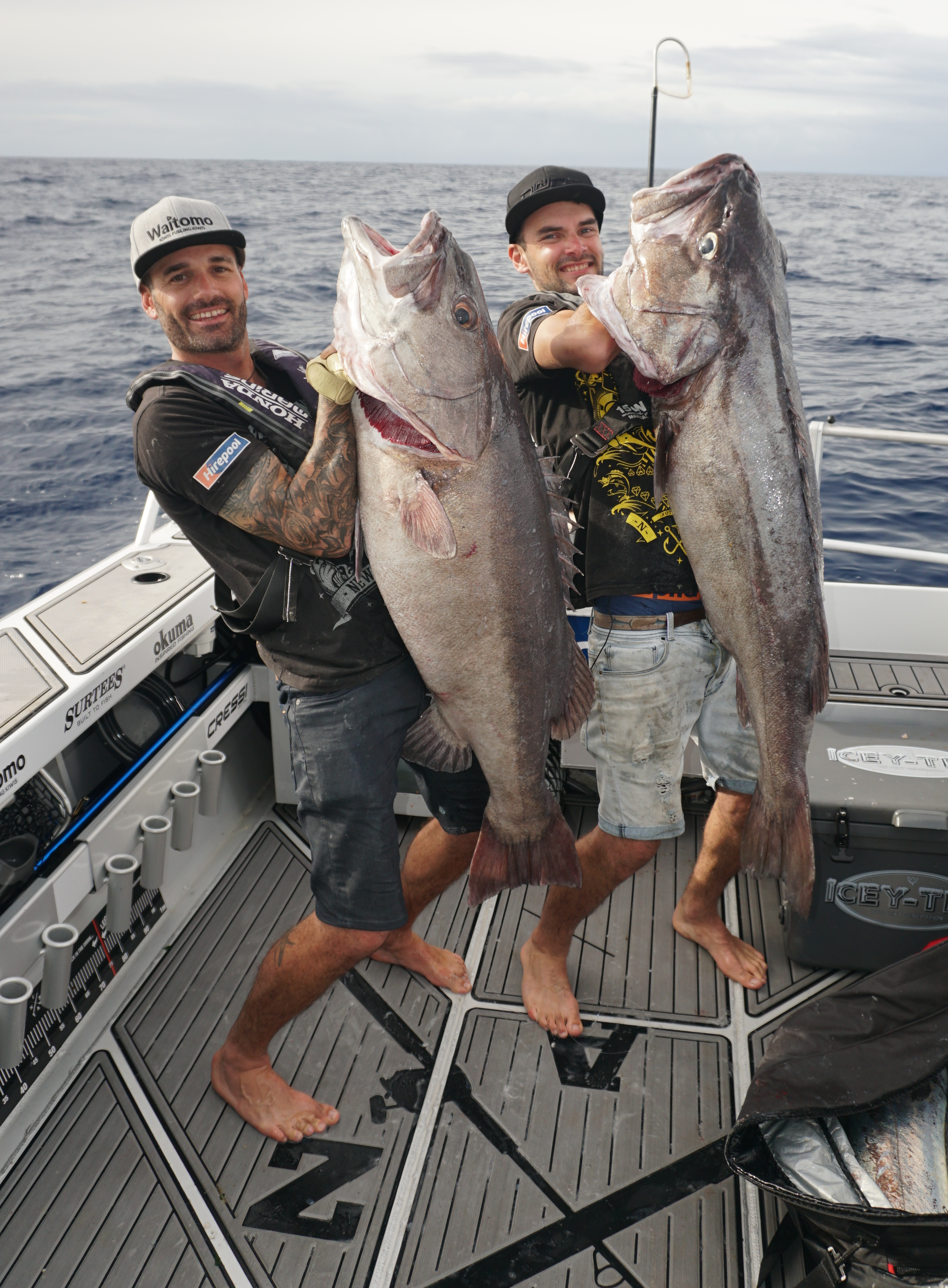
Hāpuku fishing in New Zealand

The hāpuku is a traditional food for Māori, considered one of the most prestigious fish. The name hāpuku originated in Polynesian languages, typically used to refer to fish in the Epinephelus genus, and in Māori the word hāpuku became a verb, meaning to cram food into your mouth. The name hapuka appears to be a corruption of the fish's Māori language name by early European settlers. Hāpuku fisheries were passed down through generations, and the best locations were thought to be far off-shore. Traditionally, the hāpuku was thought to be able to tell when its name was being used, so the name rarawai was used in its place during fishing expeditions.

=== Modern consumption ===
In the 1940s, a fishing industry developed around hāpuku in New Zealand. The meat was canned, and oil was extracted from the liver of the fish.

In the 21st century, hāpuku are a highly rated eating fish, reaching top value on both the local and international markets. Chefs who have tasted farmed hāpuku have stated that it outperforms wild-caught hāpuku.

In New Zealand for the year of 2008, hāpuku had a commercial value of NZ$37 million with an export value of $4.29 million at a price of $10.29 per kg. Hāpuku is fished both commercially and recreationally in New Zealand. It is highly sought after, but catches are relatively low; this species is managed in the New Zealand Quota Management System (QMS). Currently, no size restriction in New Zealand is in place, but a bag limit of five fish per day exists.

=== Aquaculture ===
Significant interest has been expressed globally for development of this species for aquaculture. In Europe, a very similar species of wreckfish is highly prized and considered a local delicacy. Because of this, the Polyprion spp. have been overfished in most areas. In New Zealand, the National Institute of Water and Atmospheric Research (NIWA) have embraced hāpuku as an opportunity for New Zealand to expand, and have identified markets for this species locally in New Zealand and Australia, and internationally in Europe and Asia.

=== Research and development ===
Since 2003, NIWA has accumulated the world's largest broodstock resource for hāpuku, and these broodstocks are held in large spawning tanks at Bream Bay Aquaculture Park. Each tank has its own controlled environment which is designed to maintain the optimum temperature and light for natural spawning. NIWA have now progressed through every aspect of hatchery technology development for hapuku. The complications encountered in this process were similar to those of other commercialised finfish species, such as halibut, turbot, sea bass, and sea bream. These complications were overcome with specific solutions developed for the early rearing of hapuku. The main technical complications that have been overcome are:

- The system design for the successful incubation of egg and yolk-sac larvae.
- Initiation of first feeding.
- The transition from live feed to formulated feeds to produce weaned juveniles ready for on-growing and transfer to sea cages.

Currently, the sea cage trials and tank trials are base-lining the performance for hāpuku. These early on-growing trials and results are revealing considerable growth potential in aquaculture for this species.

NIWA has been running a broodstock selection programme since 2007, and the results are showing which broodstock are producing the surviving first generation. With this information, it will soon be possible to start selecting desirable performance traits for the breeding programme. NIWA's aim is to maintain the competitive edge for hāpuku farming as it increases, and become an important species for New Zealand's aquaculture sector.
