= Avitolabrax =

Avitolabrax Temporal range: Early Miocene

Scientific classification
- Kingdom: Animalia
- Phylum: Chordata
- Class: Actinopterygii
- Order: Acropomatiformes
- Family: Lateolabracidae
- Genus: †Avitolabrax; Takai, 1942
- Species: †A. denticulatus

Binomial name
- †Avitolabrax denticulatus Takai, 1942

Extinct genus of ray-finned fishes

Avitolabrax is an extinct genus of marine ray-finned fish that lived during the early part of the Miocene epoch. It has a single known species, A. denticulatus, from the Siramizu Formation of Fukushima, Japan.

Initially described as a "serranid" when that family was thought to be more expansive, later studies suggest that it may be ancestral to the extant genus Lateolabrax, potentially making it the earliest member of the family Lateolabracidae.
