= Paralabrax dewegeri =

Conservation status
- Least Concern (IUCN 3.1)

Scientific classification
- Kingdom: Animalia
- Phylum: Chordata
- Class: Actinopterygii
- Division: Teleostei
- Order: Perciformes
- Family: Serranidae
- Genus: Paralabrax
- Species: P. dewegeri

Binomial name
- Paralabrax dewegeri (Metzelaar, 1919)

Synonyms
- Prionodes dewegeri (Metzelaar, 1919); Serranus dewegeri Metzelaar, 1919

Species of fish

Paralabrax dewegeri, the vieja, vieja parrot rock-bass or meo viejo, is a species of marine ray-finned fish, a sea bass from the subfamily Serraninae, classified as part of the family Serranidae which includes the groupers and anthias. It is found in the western Atlantic along the northern coast of South America.

== Description ==
Paralabrax dewegeri has an elongate compressed body with a pointed head. The preoperculum is smoothly rounded and has fine serrations along its edge. There are three spines on the gill cover, the topmost spine is blunt and rather small while the other two are sharp. The dorsal fin has 10 spines and 14 soft rays while the anal fin has three spines and seven soft rays, with the ends of the soft rayed parts of these fins being rounded. The caudal fin is truncate. The body is brown in colour, fading to yellowish brown on its lower part with seven vertical dark brown bars on the lower part of the body. There is a large dark brown spot at the base of the pectoral fins which has a pale yellowish brown line running behind it. The paired fins are dark brown. This species attains a maximum published total length of 43 centimetres (17 in), although 35 centimetres (14 in) is more common, and it has a maximum weight of 1.3 kilograms (2.9 lb).

== Distribution ==
Paralabrax dewegeri is found in the western Atlantic Ocean, where it is found along the northern coast of South America from the Gulf of Venezuela eastwards to Fortaleza in Brazil. It also occurs in Curaçao and Trinidad and Tobago.

== Habitat and biology ==
Paralabrax dewegeri is found in water with depths of between 10 and 25 metres (33 and 82 ft) over semi-hard or soft substrates and among soft corals. Juveniles are found in beds of the sea grass Thalassia. It is a carnivorous species which has a diet largely made up of crustaceans but it also feeds on fishes, molluscs, worms and brittle stars. Females attain sexual maturity at about 11 centimetres (4.3 in) and this species is a protogynous hermaphrodite.

== Taxonomy ==
Paralabrax dewegeri was first formally described as Prionodes dewegeri in 1919 by the Dutch ichthyologist Jan Metzelaar (1891-1929) with the type locality given as Guanta in Venezuela. It is the sister taxon to P. callaensis of the eastern Pacific Ocean and, in turn, these two species hare a common ancestor with the Galapagos endemic P. albomaculatus.

== Utilisation ==
Paralabrax dewegeri is said to have palatable flesh but it is of little commercial importance to fisheries because of its relatively small size.
