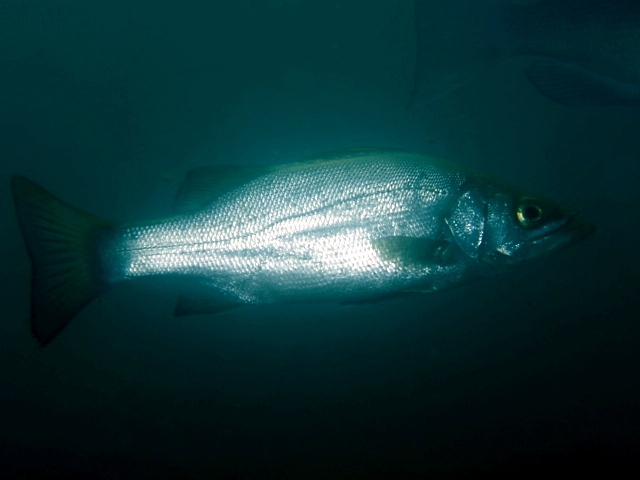

Scientific classification
- Kingdom: Animalia
- Phylum: Chordata
- Class: Actinopterygii
- Division: Teleostei
- Order: Acropomatiformes
- Family: Lateolabracidae
- Genus: Lateolabrax
- Species: L. latus

Binomial name
- Lateolabrax latus Katayama, 1957

= Blackfin seabass =

Species of fish

The blackfin seabass (Lateolabrax latus) is a Perciforme fish in the family lateolabracidae, found primarily in the shallow waters of the Pacific coast of Asia, in Japan and in South Korea. There are only two species in the genus Lateolabrax, known as Asian seabasses. As a perciforme, the blackfin seabass is among the largest order of fish in the ocean. Blackfin seabass live in shallow, tidal or rocky surf zones, partially as a way to escape competition with the Japanese seabass Lateolabrax japonicus, a close and almost identical relative of theirs, and partially for the breeding opportunity in brackish water by the mouths of rivers.

== Morphology ==
"Lateolabrax latus" — Blackfin seabass.

The blackfin seabass is a perciforme fish, or perch-like fish; it has a long, silver, elongated body, and a slight fork in the tail. The blackfin seabass is often compared to the Atlantic Striped Bass in size and appearance; Both bass species have a lower jaw which protrudes over the upper jaw, and similar dorsal and anal fins, but the blackfin lacks stripes running along either side of its body. As a perch-like fish, the blackfin seabass contains spines along the dorsal and anal fins and pectoral fins along the sides of its body for defense against predation. The largest blackfin sea bass caught, on record, is 24 lbs. The longest seabass recorded was 94 cm.

== Distribution ==
The blackfin seabass is found in rocky surf zones or tidal areas of shallow water along the coast of Japan, South Korea, and Vietnam. An anadromous fish, it is known to spawn in intertidal zones, eelbeds, and mouths of rivers (although it spends most of its time in the surf). The blackfin seabass is endemic to the area of Southeast Asia and Japan, meaning that it is specific to that geographic area and can only be found there.

== Environmental Factors ==
While there is a geographical separation between blackfin seabass and their closest morphological relative, the Japanese seabass, the two often interact. The two species often engage in heavy interspecific competition, which can harm spawning rates for either fish. The relationship between the two species is complicated and ambiguous: the two are known to engage both competition and sympatry. Japanese and blackfin seabass are easily confused. It is understood that the two share a morphological parent, or common ancestor, the Lateolabrax Bleeker.

== Fishing ==
The blackfin seabass plays a primary and important position in commercial and recreational fishing on the coast of Japan. Both members of the genus Lateolabrax, the Japanese Seabass and the Blackfin Seabass, impact the fishing landscape of Japan. Fishing in Japan constitutes a substantial facet of the Japanese citizen's diet, and most of Japan's population interacts with the fishing industry. The close proximity and commonality of perciforme fish like the blackfin along shores grants them a pivotal role in the fishing industry. The seabass’ role in the fishing infrastructure of Japan adversely affects spawning for the fish species, as well as overfishing; the perciforme order is the most overfished in the world.

== Lifestyle ==
Blackfin seabass spawn at the mouths of rivers, most popularly in Japan. the fish remain larvae for one to three months, and spend their time as larvae in calm eelgrass beds in shallow zones of the ocean and mouths of rivers. As adults, blackfin seabass will return to rocky, inland tidal surf zones. After careful study of their migration and spawning habits, it can be concluded that the blackfin seabass makes frequent changes to their spawning and migration. For example, the seabass recently moved from deeper estuaries in which to spawn to shallower, calmer ones. Scientists attribute this to the availability of food like crustaceans, however, juvenile blackfin seabass are known to practice cannibalism.

The blackfin seabass, Lateolabrax latus, is a species of Asian seabass native to the western Pacific in the coastal waters of central Japan and South Korea. This species is found in shallow waters in rocky areas, in demersal marine environments where the number of large predators such as sharks is low, and the population of prey species such as crustaceans, worms, shellfish, and small fish is high. It can reach a length of 94 cm (37 in) and has been recorded weighing up to 9.1 kg (20 lb). It is a commercially important fish, but is commonly referred to accidentally as the black sea bass (Centropristis). It is also a very popular game fish, and is commonly farmed for a variety of reasons, from being kept in aquariums, game fishing, fertilizer, and food for marine zoo creatures. It is known as the blackfin due to the color of its fins, although the fry and juvenile specimens do not gain this fin color. Despite its size and role as a predatory fish, it is considered harmless to humans, as no attacks from blackfin seabass have ever been reported.

== Use in cuisine ==
The blackfin seabass consumption is widespread in sushi bars and restaurants in different areas of Japan.
