= Paralabrax loro =

Scientific classification
- Kingdom: Animalia
- Phylum: Chordata
- Class: Actinopterygii
- Division: Teleostei
- Order: Perciformes
- Family: Serranidae
- Genus: Paralabrax
- Species: P. loro

Binomial name
- Paralabrax loro Walford, 1936

Species of ray-finned fish

Paralabrax loro, commonly known as the parrot sand bass, is a species of grouper fish in the family Serranidae. It is found in the Pacific Ocean on the coast of lower North America and South America.
