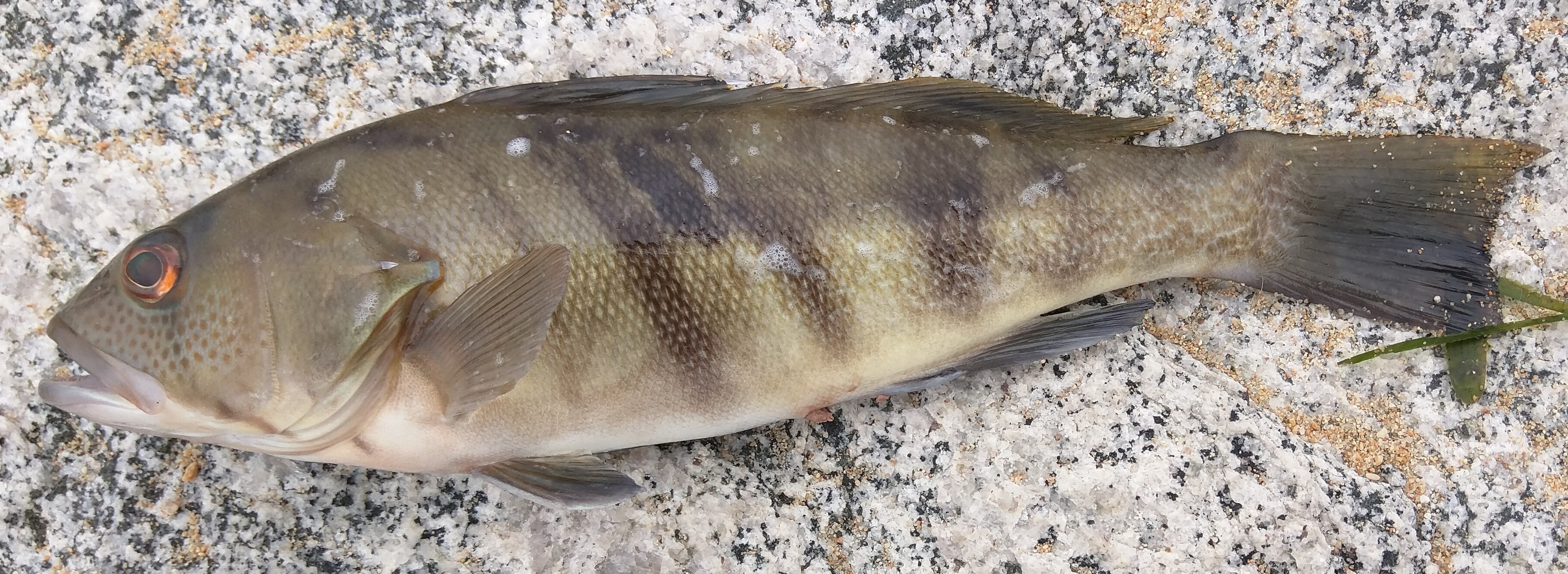

Conservation status
- Least Concern (IUCN 3.1)

Scientific classification
- Kingdom: Animalia
- Phylum: Chordata
- Class: Actinopterygii
- Order: Perciformes
- Family: Serranidae
- Genus: Paralabrax
- Species: P. nebulifer

Binomial name
- Paralabrax nebulifer (Girard, 1854)

Synonyms
- Labrax nebulifer Girard, 1854

= Barred sand bass =

Species of fish

The barred sand bass (Paralabrax nebulifer) is a species of fish in the family Serranidae, the sea basses and groupers. It is native to California and Baja California, where it lives in the coastal waters of the eastern Pacific Ocean.

== Description ==
This species can reach a length of 67.0 centimetres (26.4 in) and a weight of 6.0 kilograms (13.2 lb).

The body is elongated and compressed. It is gray-white in color with dark vertical bars and a whitish belly. It has a large mouth and a slightly protruding lower jaw. Similar species include the spotted sand bass (P. maculatofasciatus), which can be distinguished by small spots all along the body. The barred and spotted sand bass have an elongated third dorsal spine, distinguishing them from the similar kelp bass (P. clathratus), which has dorsal spines of equal length.

== Range ==
Barred sand bass occur from Santa Cruz, California to Magdalena Bay in Baja California Sur.

== Natural history ==
It is usually found on sand bottom among or near rocks. This species lives in shallow waters up to 182.88 feet deep. It is most commonly caught in 60 to 90 feet of water. It lives on sandy bottoms.

The barred sand bass eats other fish, especially plainfin midshipman, and some invertebrates. Juveniles eat many types of small invertebrates and small fish.

The species forms spawning aggregations in the warmer months and is a pelagic spawner, releasing eggs freely into the water. Like other species of genus Paralabrax, the barred sand bass can change sex, with individuals turning from female to male as they age and grow larger, but most do not.

This is a popular sport fish in Southern California. Population studies have been performed by the California Department of Fish and Wildlife. Populations are stable, likely due to recreational fishing regulations and a ban on commercial fishing of the species. It may also benefit from marine protected areas along the California coast.
