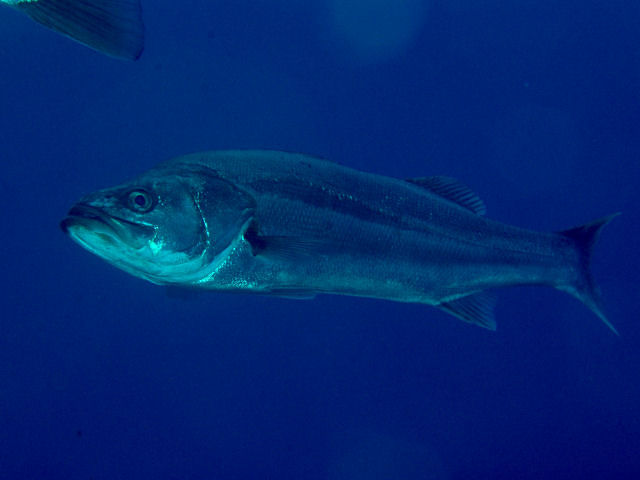

Conservation status
- Least Concern (IUCN 3.1)

Scientific classification
- Kingdom: Animalia
- Phylum: Chordata
- Class: Actinopterygii
- Order: Acropomatiformes
- Family: Lateolabracidae
- Genus: Lateolabrax
- Species: L. japonicus

Binomial name
- Lateolabrax japonicus (Cuvier, 1828)

Synonyms
- Labrax japonicus Cuvier, 1828; Percalabrax japonicus (Cuvier, 1828); Holocentrum maculatum McClelland, 1844; Lateolabrax maculatus (McClelland, 1844); Percalabrax poecilonotus Dabry de Thiersant, 1872; Percalabrax spilonotus Dabry de Thiersant, 1872; Percalabrax tokionensis Döderlein, 1883

= Japanese sea bass =

Species of fish

The Japanese sea bass (Lateolabrax japonicus) is a species of catadromous marine ray-finned fish from the Asian sea bass family Lateolabracidae. It is found in the Western Pacific.

== Vernacular names ==
In the Kantō region and Shizuoka Prefecture, it is called seigo (セイゴ, 鮬) when under 25 cm (9.8 in) in length. At 3 years of age, when it has attained a length of nearly 60 cm (24 in), the name changes to fukko (フッコ) or suzuki (スズキ, 鱸). In the Kansai region, it is called seigo, hane (ハネ) or suzuki, and other regions may have names for this fish different from the ones just listed.

In China, this fish is commonly called 花鲈 (traditional Chinese: 花鱸).

== Description ==
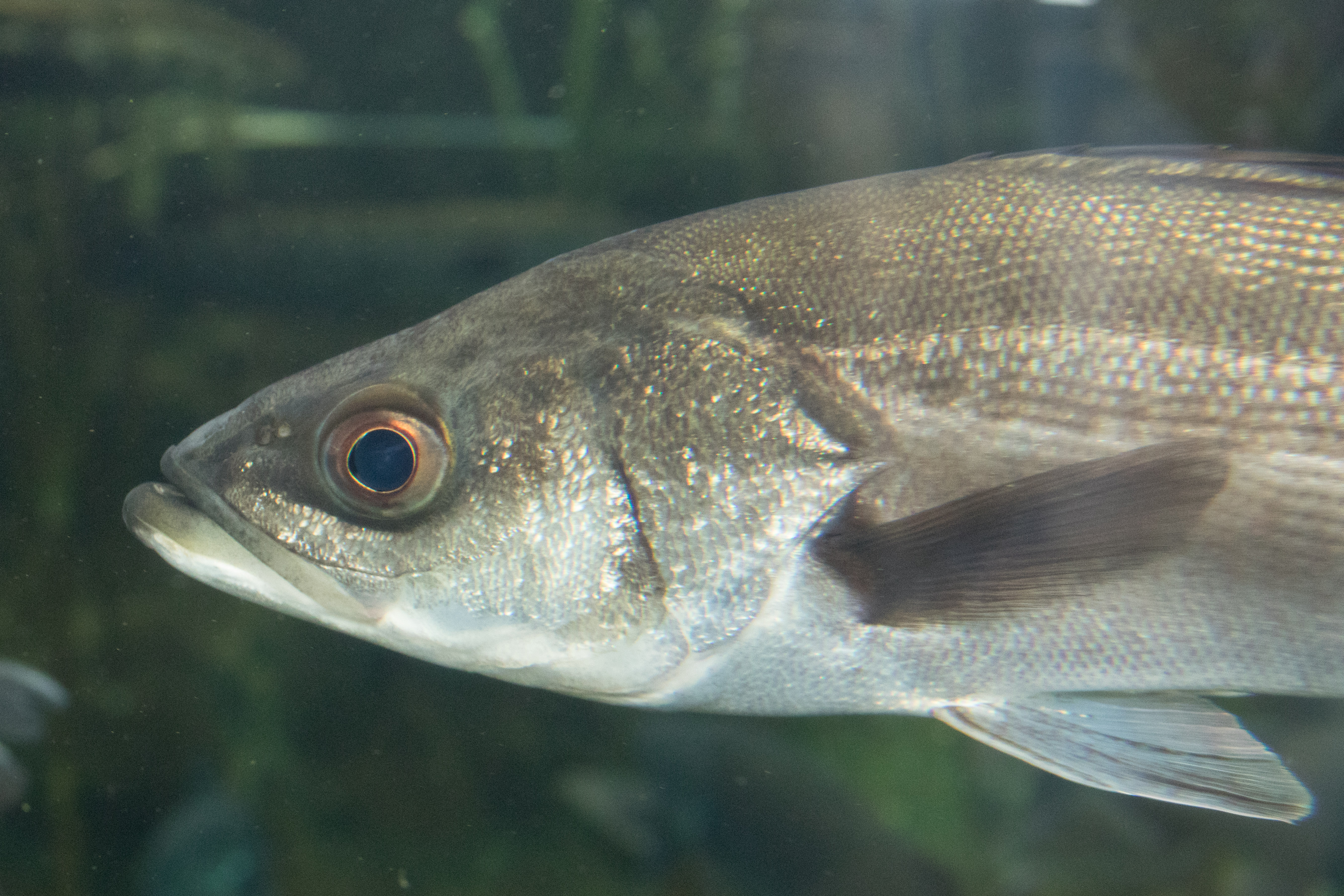
Head of Japanese sea bass.

The Japanese sea bass has a slightly forked tail and a large mouth, with the lower jaw protruding beyond the upper jaw. Younger fish have small black spots on the back and dorsal fin; these tend to be lost in larger fish. The first dorsal fin has 12-15 spines; this is followed by 12-14 soft rays in the second dorsal fin. The anal fin has 3 spines and 7 to 9 soft rays. The maximum recorded total length is 102 cm (3.35 ft), although a more common standard length is 16.1 cm (6.3 in). The maximum published weight is 8.7 kg (19 lb).

== Distribution and habitat ==
The Japanese sea bass is found in the Western Pacific Ocean, where it occurs from Japan to the South China Sea. It occurs on inshore rocky reefs where there is a current.

== Biology ==
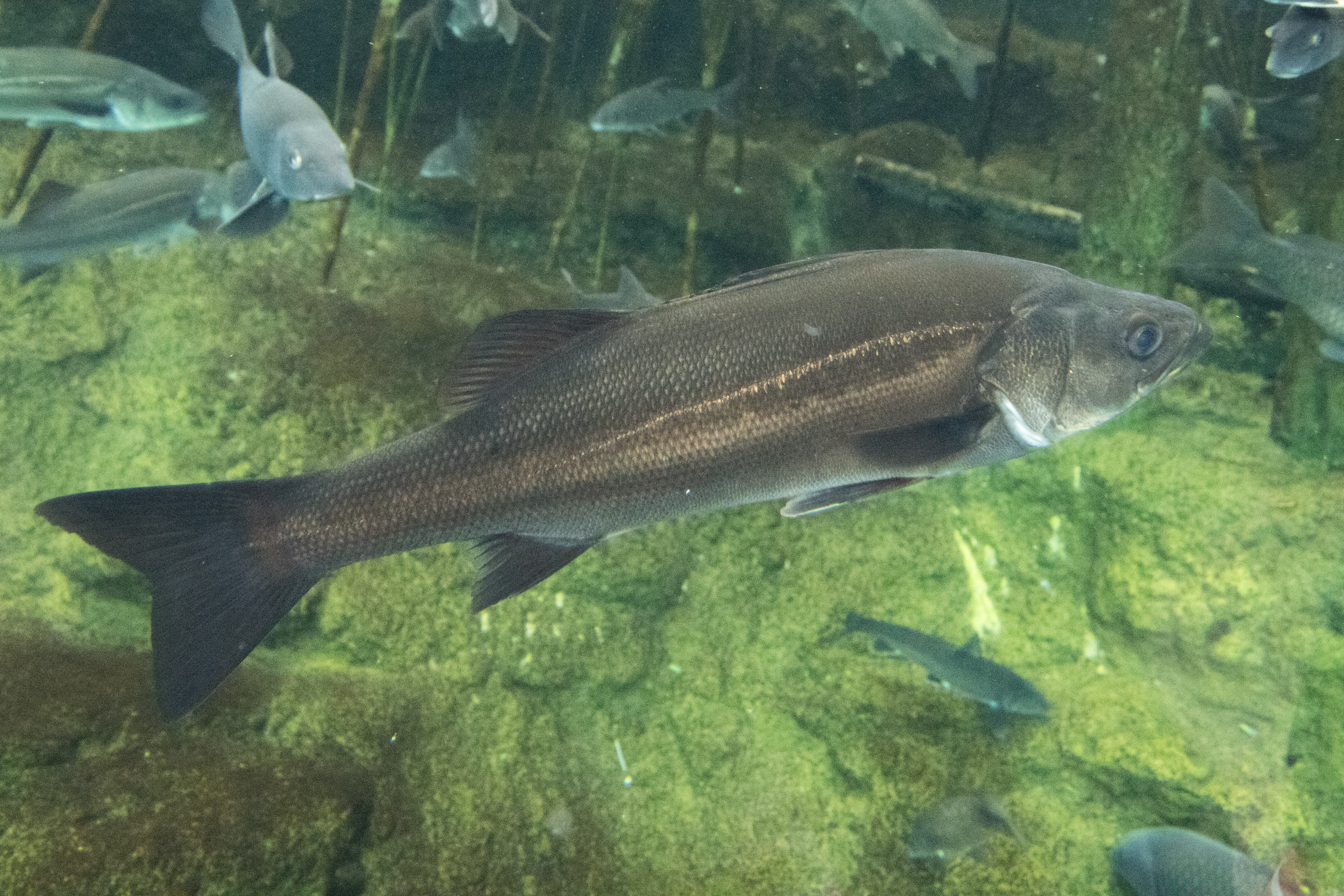
Japanese sea bass specimen in May 2018.

=== Diet ===
The diet of the early larvae is exclusively on smaller zooplankton such as cyclopoids and copepods, with copepods being the dominant component in their diet, making up nearly 70%. As juveniles, the diet includes sardines, anchovies, and shrimp, as well as other small fishes and crustaceans.

=== Reproduction and development ===
The Japanese sea bass is a protandrous hermaphrodite, with the fish reaching sexual maturity as males at around 2 years old and changing into females when they are older. Spawning of this species occurs in the coastal waters around Japan, specifically in the shelf areas with a depth of less than 100 m (330 ft) during late October to late January. The water temperature where the eggs are placed in a significant factor for the survival rate, since they do not tolerate temperatures below 10 °C (50 °F). The eggs are spherical and colorless, and measure about 1.34-1.44 mm in diameter with a single oil globule. Larvae commence feeding at day 4 after hatching, and the transformation from larva to the juvenile stage is around 49 to 70 days of age.

=== Migration ===
Juveniles are dispersed and transported kilometers away from the spawning grounds into coastal areas and river estuaries by tidal currents during late winter or early spring. Some of their nursery habitats are located around Japanese seas, such as Tamara River estuary, Tokyo Bay, Tango Sea, Ariake Bay, and Lake Shinji. Most of the early juveniles migrate to the upriver turbidity maximum zone (TMZ), which is known as an area of high prey concentration in estuaries. Juveniles that migrate to these areas have a better chance to survive than those who remain in coastal areas, since its environmental conditions are more variable, allowing juveniles to have higher growth rate, a lower starvation rate, and less risk of predation.

== Human interactions ==
This species is important commercially in Japan and China, popular as a game fish, and farmed.

== Relationship with Lateolabrax maculatus ==
Lateolabrax maculatus has been treated as a junior synonym of L. japonicus, but more recent authorities have treated it as a valid species with a wide distribution: in the Ariake Sea and off Nagasaki in Japan, and off the coasts of mainland China, Taiwan and Korea (normally off the southern and western coasts).

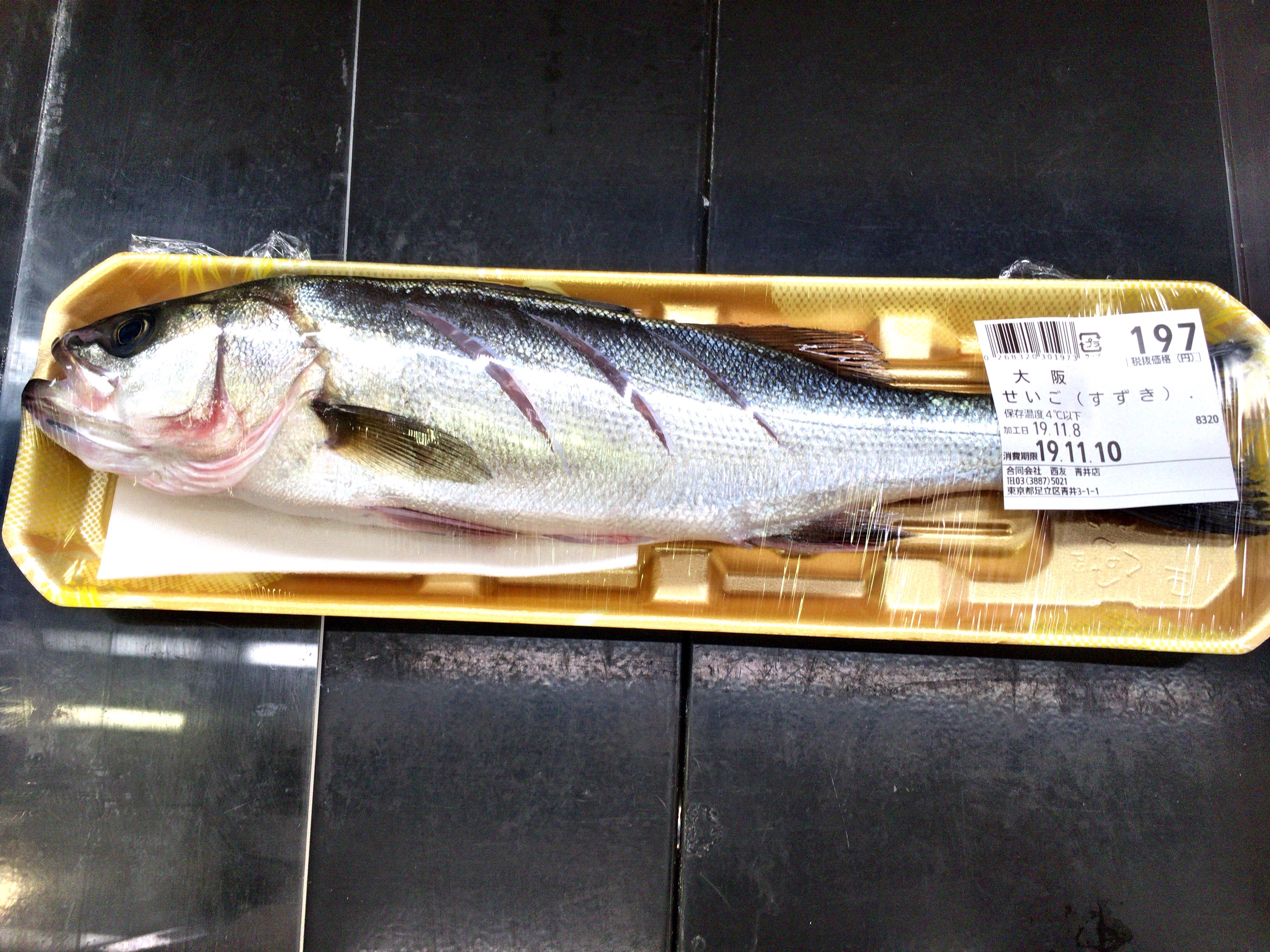
Japanese sea bass being sold as food in Japan
