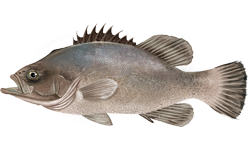
- Atlantic wreckfish, Polyprion americanus

Scientific classification
- Kingdom: Animalia
- Phylum: Chordata
- Class: Actinopterygii
- Order: Acropomatiformes
- Family: Polyprionidae; Bleeker, 1874
- Genus: Polyprion; Oken, 1817

Species
- see text

= Wreckfish =

Genus of ray-finned fish

The wreckfish are a small group of ray-finned fish in the genus Polyprion, belonging to the monotypic family Polyprionidae in the order Acropomatiformes.

They are deep-water marine fish and can be found on the ocean bottom, where they inhabit caves and shipwrecks (thus their common name). Their scientific name is from Greek poly meaning "many" and prion meaning "saw", a reference to their prominent spiny fins.

Atlantic wreckfish (Polyprion americanus) are a long-lived commercial species in the Mediterranean, the south-eastern Pacific and the Atlantic Ocean.

== Taxonomy ==
There are two species:

- Polyprion americanus (Bloch & Schneider, 1801) (Atlantic wreckfish)
- Polyprion oxygeneios (Schneider & Forster, 1801) (Hāpuku)

The genera Lateolabrax and Stereolepis have previously been classified in Polyprionidae, but they are currently placed in their own monogeneric families Lateolabracidae and Stereolepididae.
