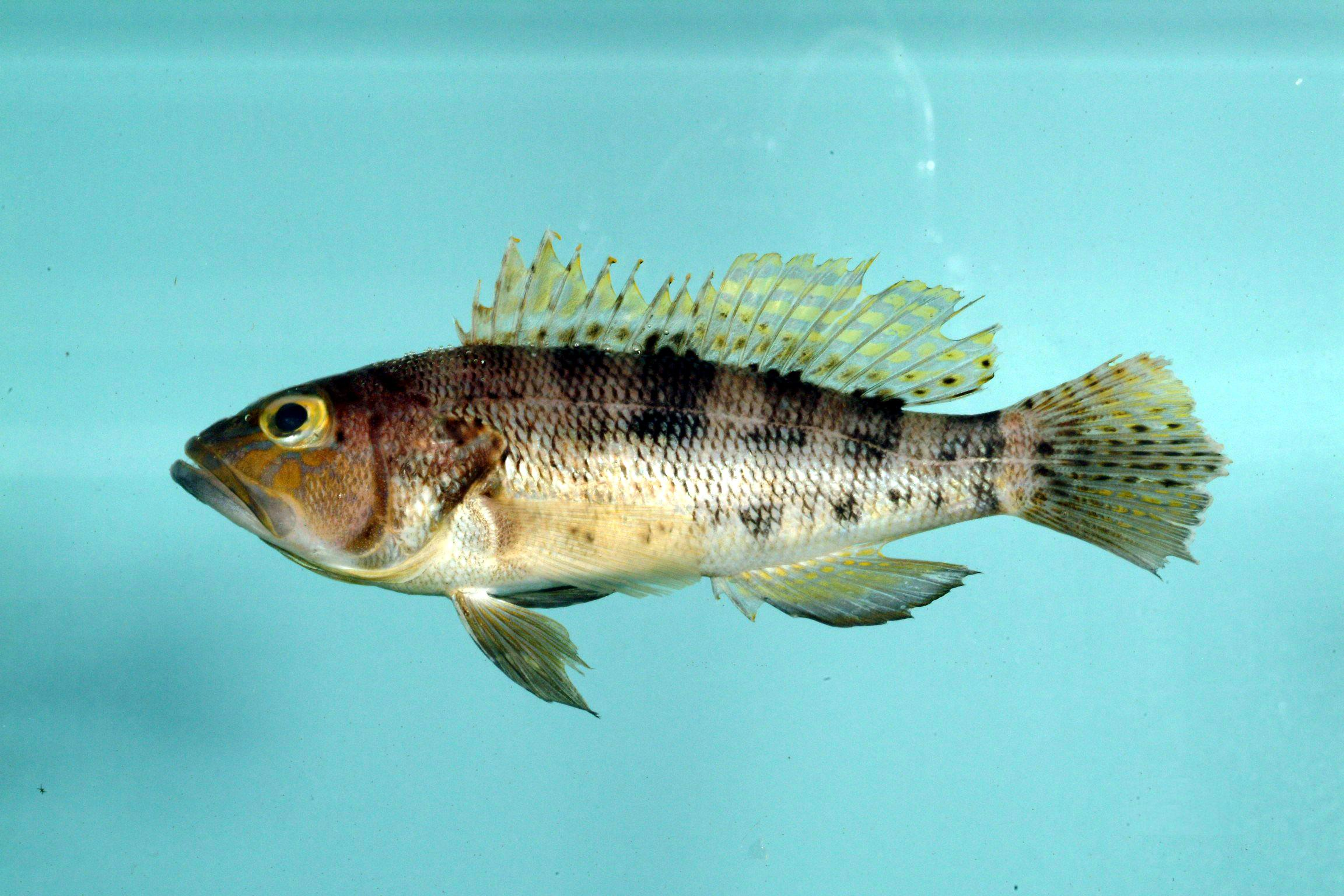
- bank sea bass (Centropristis ocyurus)

Scientific classification
- Kingdom: Animalia
- Phylum: Chordata
- Class: Actinopterygii
- Order: Perciformes
- Family: Serranidae
- Genus: Centropristis; Cuvier, 1829

Type species
- Centropristis nigricans Cuvier, 1829

Species
- 5

= Centropristis =

Genus of fishes

Centropristis is a genus of marine ray-finned fishes which is a member of the subfamily Serraninae of the family Serranidae, which includes the groupers and anthias. There are five species distributed in the western North Atlantic Ocean. Fishes of this genus are known commonly as sea basses.

Black sea bass (C. striata) is of economic importance in commercial and recreational fishing in the waters off of the East Coast of the United States.

Species in genus Centropristis include:

- Centropristis ocyurus (D.S. Jordan & Evermann, 1887) (bank sea bass)
- Centropristis philadelphica (Linnaeus, 1758) (rock sea bass)
- Centropristis rufa Cuvier 1829 (Incertae sedis)
- Centropristis striata (Linnaeus 1758) (black sea bass)
