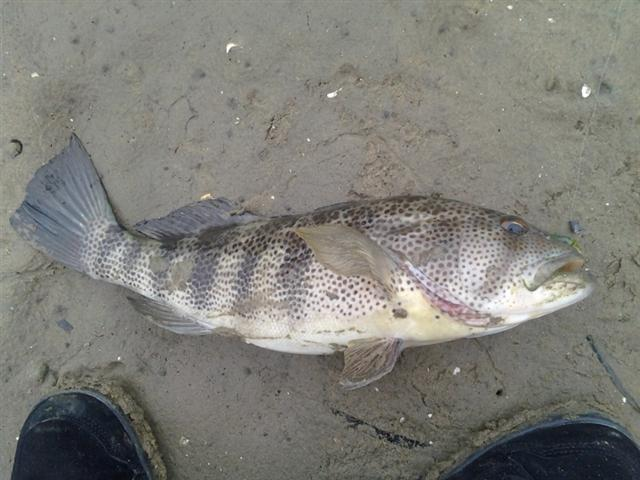

Conservation status
- Least Concern (IUCN 3.1)

Scientific classification
- Kingdom: Animalia
- Phylum: Chordata
- Class: Actinopterygii
- Division: Teleostei
- Order: Perciformes
- Family: Serranidae
- Genus: Paralabrax
- Species: P. maculatofasciatus

Binomial name
- Paralabrax maculatofasciatus (Steindachner, 1868)

Synonyms
- Serranus maculatofasciatus Steindachner, 1868

= Spotted sand bass =

Species of fish

The spotted bay bass (Paralabrax maculatofasciatus) is a species of marine ray-finned fish, a sea bass from the subfamily Serraninae, classified as part of the family Serranidae which includes the groupers and anthias. It is found in the central eastern Pacific Ocean.

== Description ==
The spotted sand bass has an elongate, compressed body which has a standard length which is 3.0-3.3 times its depth. It has a pointed head with a large mouth. The edges of the preopercle are finely serrated. The dorsal fin has 10 spines, the third spine being greatly elongated, and 13-14 soft rays while the anal fin has 3 spines and 7 soft rays. The caudal fin is rounded or concave. The overall colour of the body is tan with many black, brown and orange spots which meld together to create dark, vertical bars along the posterior of the ventral surface. There is a dark line that runs from the eye to the operculum and there are 6 or 7 dark lines on the flanks. The anal, caudal, and the soft part of the dorsal fins are covered in a dense pattern of spots. The spotted sand bass has a maximum published total length of 67 centimetres (26 in) with a maximum weight of 6.0 kilograms (13.2 lb).

== Distribution ==
The spotted sand bass is found in the central eastern Pacific Ocean. It is found in southern California, as far north as Monterey Bay but it is rare north of Santa Monica Bay, south to the southern tip of Baja California in Mexico, although historically it was found as far south as Mazatlan.

== Habitat and biology ==
The spotted sand bass is normally found in shallow, warm-water areas in bays and harbours as well as sheltered coastal environments. They show a preference where the habitat has some structure, such as eelgrass, surfgrass or rocks. The spotted sand bass is carnivorous and they feed mainly on crustaceans, bivalves, and small fishes, The spawning season is from May until September. The females release their eggs into the water column and the pelagic larvae live for around a month before they settle. This species is a protogynous hermaphrodite. It is a rather secretive species which hunts during the day.

== Taxonomy ==
The spotted sand bass was first formally described as Serranus maculatofasciatus in 1868 by the Austrian ichthyologist Franz Steindachner (1834-1919) with the type locality given as Mazatlan in Sinaloa, Mexico. It is one of the most derived species in the genus Paralabrax and is the sister taxon of the barred sand bass (P. nebulifer).

== Utilization ==
The spotted sand bass is an important quarry species for recreational game fisheries where it is caught in bays and harbors. It is taken as a bycatch in the Gulf of California.
