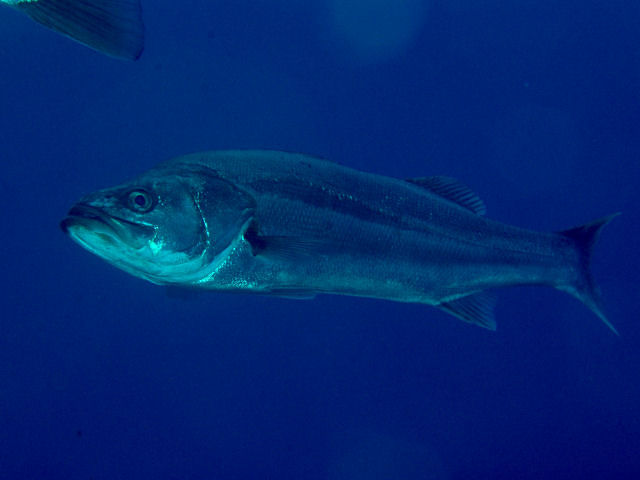
- Japanese seabass (L. japonicus)

Scientific classification
- Kingdom: Animalia
- Phylum: Chordata
- Class: Actinopterygii
- Order: Acropomatiformes
- Family: Lateolabracidae; V. G. Springer & Raasch, 1965
- Genus: Lateolabrax; Bleeker, 1855

Type species
- Labrax japonicus Cuvier, 1828

Synonyms
- Percalabrax Temminck & Schlegel, 1843

= Lateolabrax =

Genus of ray-finned fishes

Lateolabrax is a genus of commercially important ray-finned fishes known as the Asian seabasses. It is the only genus in the family Lateolabracidae. This genus is native to the coastal waters of the western Pacific Ocean. This genus has also been included in family Moronidae (temperate basses) and may be nested within the Polyprionidae.

One potential fossil genus is also known in Avitolabrax from the earliest Miocene of Japan, which may be ancestral to Lateolabrax.

== Species ==
The currently recognized species in this genus are:

Image	Scientific name	Common name	Distribution
	Lateolabrax japonicus Cuvier, 1828	Japanese sea bass	Western pacific where it occurs from Japan to the South China Sea.
	Lateolabrax latus Katayama, 1957	Blackfin sea bass	coast of Japan, South Korea, and Vietnam.
