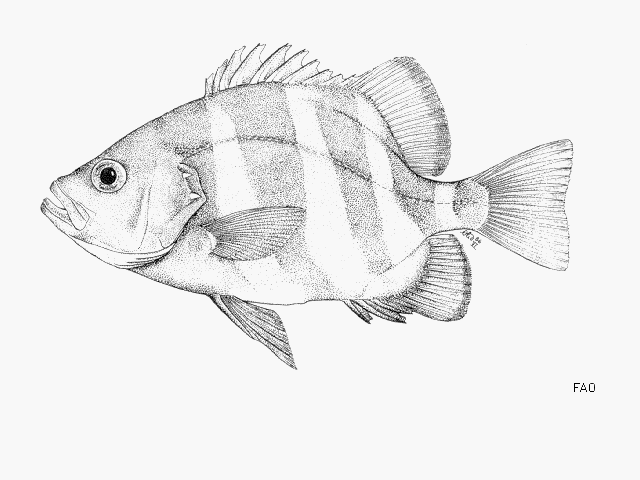
- Hand-drawn sketch of Centrarchops chapini

Conservation status
- Least Concern (IUCN 3.1)

Scientific classification
- Kingdom: Animalia
- Phylum: Chordata
- Class: Actinopterygii
- Order: Acanthuriformes
- Family: Dinopercidae
- Genus: Centrarchops; Fowler, 1923
- Species: C. chapini

Binomial name
- Centrarchops chapini Fowler, 1923

= Barred seabass =

Species of ray-finned fish

The barred seabass (Centrarchops chapini) is a species of marine ray-finned fish, a cavebass from the family Dinopercidae, which is native to the coastal waters of Gabon to Angola (including the Democratic Republic of the Congo and the Republic of the Congo as well).

This dermersal fish can be found over areas of sand and rock at depths from 20 to 40 m (66 to 131 ft). This species grows to 30.7 cm (12.1 in) in total length. It is important to local commercial fisheries. This species is the only known member of the genus Centrarchops, first catalogued by H.W. Fowler in 1923. The specific name honors the American ornithologist James Chapin (1889–1964).

As of 14 July 2014, centrarchops chapini is not considered threatened by the IUCN and is listed as a least-concern species. The justification for this designation stems from the fact that, while centrarchops chapini is susceptible pollution and destructive fishing practices, these threats would be localized and not species specific.
