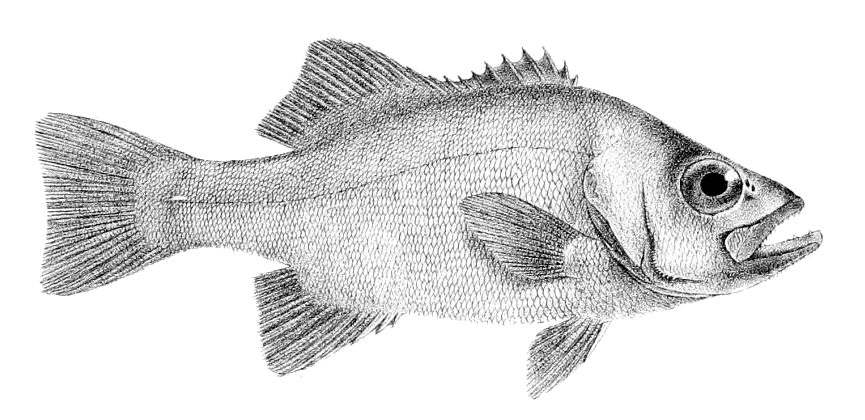
- Dinoperca petersi

Scientific classification
- Kingdom: Animalia
- Phylum: Chordata
- Class: Actinopterygii
- Order: Acanthuriformes
- Family: Dinopercidae; Heemstra & Hecht, 1986

Genera
- See text

= Dinopercidae =

Family of ray-finned fishes

The Dinopercidae, known commonly as the cavebasses, are a family of marine ray-finned fish from the order Acanthuriformes. They are native to the western Indian and the Atlantic coasts of Africa.

== Genera ==
There are two genera within the family:

- Centrarchops Fowler, 1923
- Dinoperca Boulenger, 1895

== See also ==
- List of fish families
