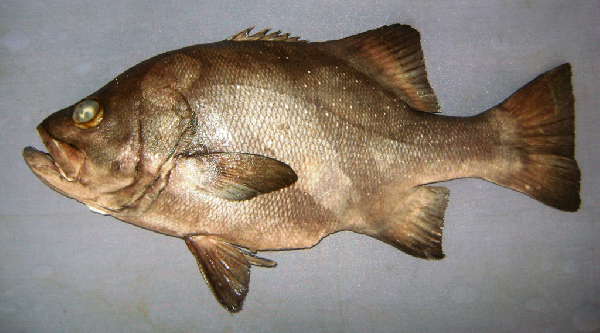
- In Pakistan

Scientific classification
- Kingdom: Animalia
- Phylum: Chordata
- Class: Actinopterygii
- Division: Teleostei
- Order: Acanthuriformes
- Family: Dinopercidae
- Genus: Dinoperca; Boulenger, 1895
- Species: D. petersi

Binomial name
- Dinoperca petersi (F. Day, 1875)

Synonyms
- Hapalogenys petersi Day, 1875; Dinoperca queketti Boulenger, 1903

= Dinoperca =

Species of fish

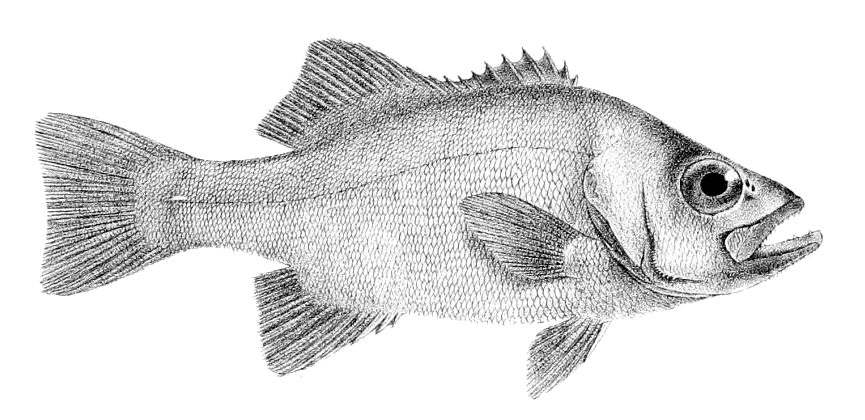
Illustration

Dinoperca petersi, the lampfish or the cavebass, is a species in the monotypic genus Dinoperca and one of two species in the family Dinopercidae.

== Taxonomy ==
Dinoperca is one of two genera in the family Dinopercidae (cavebasses). The identity of the person honoured in the specific name is not stated, but Day thanks "Professor Peters" for his assistance in identifying the type species. This refers to Wilhelm Peters (1815-1883), who was Director of the Berlin Museum.

== Biology and ecology ==
Cavebass are relatively deep bodied, a blackish-brown to brownish-purple color, with small white spots on the body that fade in larger specimens. Juveniles have a lighter silvery body with black markings, which can fade as they become adults. A black band is present from the snout to the preopercle.

Cavebass grow to 75 cm (30 in) in total length and 5.8 kg (13 lb) in weight.

This fish is native to both rocky and coral reefs of the western Indian Ocean, from Pakistan to South Africa. It can be found down to depths of 75 m (246 ft). The cavebass prefers to inhabit the spaces under ledges, as well as the mouths of caves, while juveniles inhabit shallower rocky reefs.

A study found that a large majority of cavebass are highly resident species with a home range of around 290–450 m (950–1,480 ft), meaning they often stick close to their home reef.

Adults feed primarily on small invertebrates including crabs, shrimp, and octopuses, as well as small fish. Cavebass tend to be more active nocturnally.

Cavebass are also able to make a loud drumming noise while underwater.

It is of minor importance to local commercial fisheries, but is popular as a sport fish, especially along the eastern coast of South Africa, where they can be referred to as "lantern fish" (not to be confused with lanternfish of the family Myctophidae).
