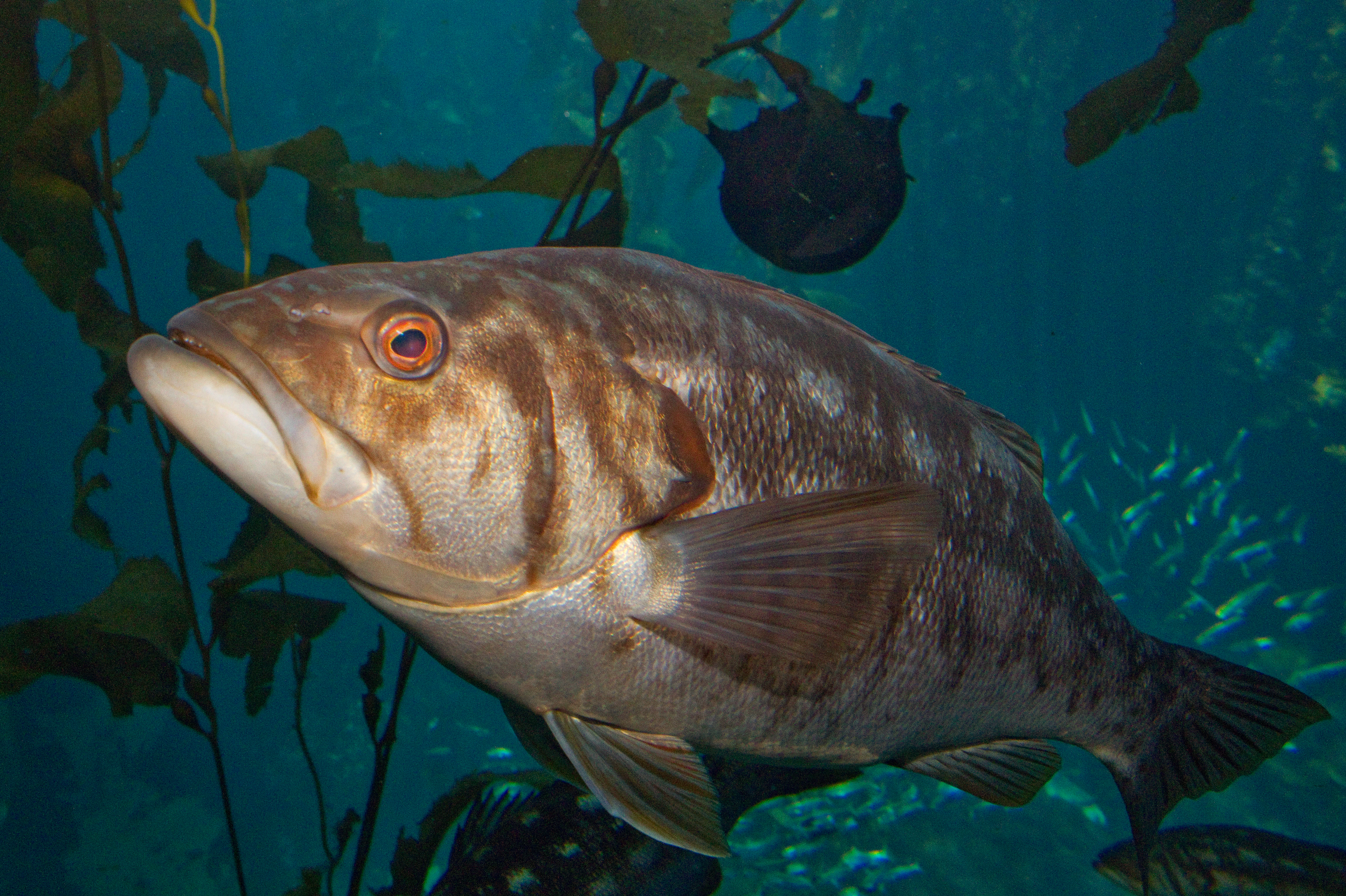
- Paralabrax clathratus (kelp bass)

Scientific classification
- Kingdom: Animalia
- Phylum: Chordata
- Class: Actinopterygii
- Order: Perciformes
- Family: Serranidae
- Genus: Paralabrax; Girard, 1856

Type species
- Labrax nebulifer Girard, 1854

Species
- See text.

Synonyms
- Atractoperca Gill, 1861; Gonioperca Gill, 1862

= Paralabrax =

Genus of fishes

Paralabrax is a genus of fishes in the family Serranidae. They are known commonly as rock basses. The nine species in the genus are native to rocky reef habitat in the eastern Pacific and western Atlantic Oceans, where they are often dominant predators in the ecosystem. They are also commercially important in local fisheries.

== Biology ==
Like many fish in the family Serranidae, some Paralabrax species are hermaphrodites, specifically protogynous hermaphrodites, which are female when young and eventually change into males. Others are gonochores, with individuals being either male or female and never changing sex. Gonochores in this genus are thought to be "secondary gonochores", species with ancestors that were hermaphrodites and lost the ability to change sex. An exception is the barred sand bass (P. nebulifer), which is a gonochore which has retained the ability. In addition, the spotted sand bass (P. maculatofasciatus) appears to be flexible, with some populations made up of gonochores and some made up of hermaphroditic individuals.

Paralabrax species generally spawn early in summer, their larvae joining the ichthyoplankton when the water is warmest.

== Economic importance ==
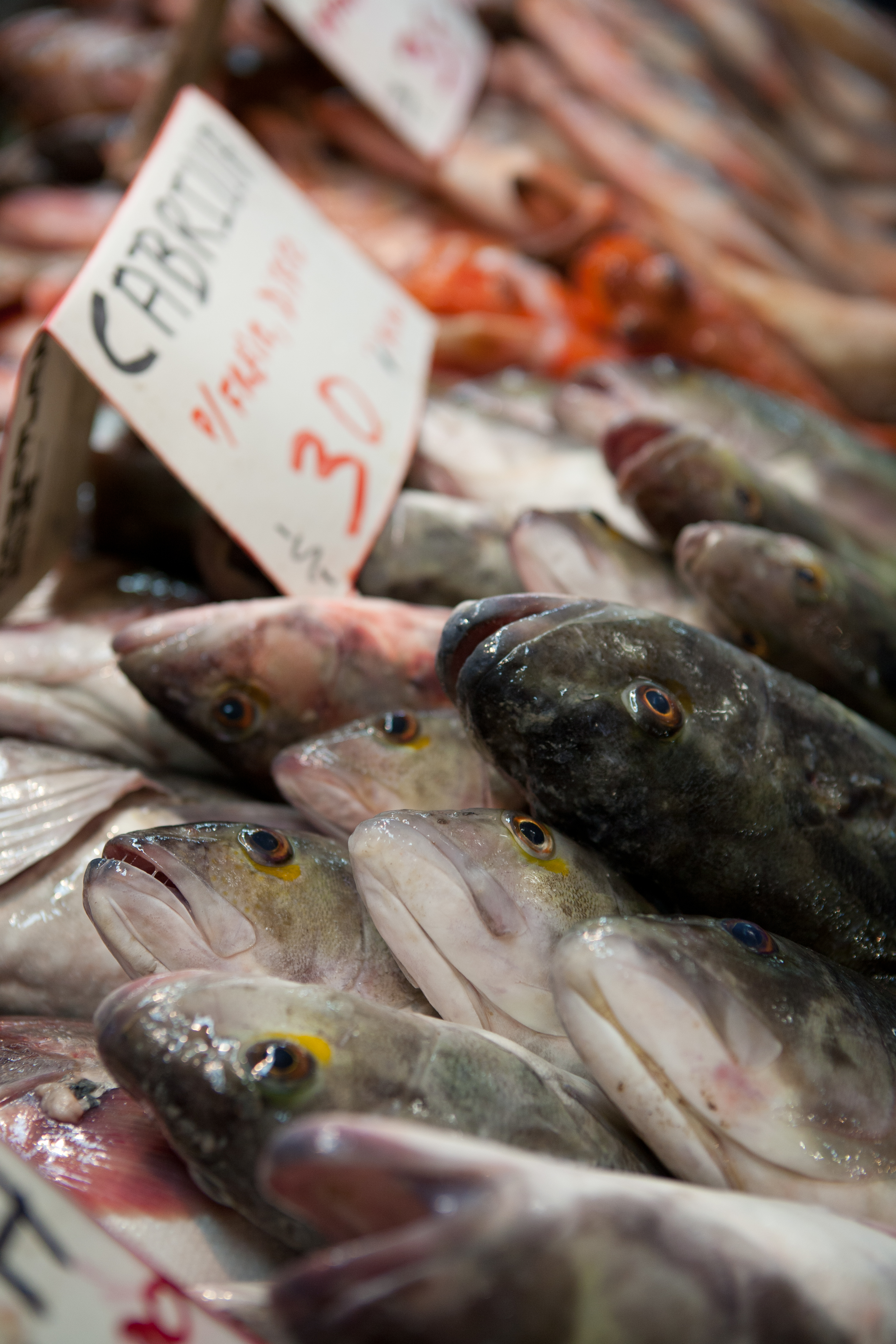
spotted sand bass (Paralabrax maculatofasciatus) at a fish market in Ensenada, Baja California, Mexico

Several species are of economic importance as food fish. The spotted sand bass (P. maculatofasciatus) is harvested in the commercial fishing industry and is caught for subsistence.

Some of these fish are also popular catches in recreational fishing. The kelp bass (P. clathratus) and barred sand bass (P. nebulifer) are sought after in the waters along the coast of Southern California and northern Baja California, where they have both been in the top three species caught on commercial sportfishing tours.

== Systematics ==
This genus is a basal clade in the Serraninae, the basal subfamily in the family Serranidae. In terms of its evolutionary history, these fish species have characteristics that were present in the earliest known members of the family. A phylogenetic analysis showed that the grey threadfin sea-bass (Cratinus agassizii) is the sister taxon to genus Paralabrax.

Species include:

- Paralabrax albomaculatus (Jenyns, 1840) (camotillo)
- Paralabrax auroguttatus Walford, 1936 (goldspotted sand bass)
- Paralabrax callaensis Starks, 1906 (southern rock bass)
- Paralabrax clathratus (Girard, 1854) (kelp bass)
- Paralabrax dewegeri (Metzelaar, 1919) (vieja)
- Paralabrax humeralis (Valenciennes, 1828) (Peruvian rock seabass)
- Paralabrax loro Walford, 1936 (parrot sand bass)
- Paralabrax maculatofasciatus (Steindachner, 1868) (spotted sand bass)
- Paralabrax nebulifer (Girard, 1854) (barred sand bass)
