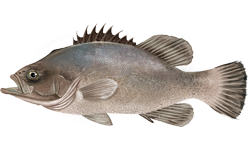

Conservation status
- Data Deficient (IUCN 3.1)

Scientific classification
- Kingdom: Animalia
- Phylum: Chordata
- Class: Actinopterygii
- Order: Acropomatiformes
- Family: Polyprionidae
- Genus: Polyprion
- Species: P. americanus

Binomial name
- Polyprion americanus (Bloch and Schneider, 1801)

Synonyms
- Sparus cernua Poggi, 1881; Amphiprion americanus Bloch & Schneider, 1801; Polyprion cernium Valenciennes, 1824; Polyprion massiliense Costa, 1829; Polyprion moeone Phillipps, 1927

= Atlantic wreckfish =

Species of fish

The Atlantic wreckfish (Polyprion americanus), also known as the stone bass or bass groper (among other names), is a marine, bathydemersal, and oceanodromous ray-finned fish in the family Polyprionidae. It has a worldwide, if disjunct, distribution in the Atlantic, Pacific and Indian Oceans.

== Description ==
The Atlantic wreckfish is a large fish with a deep, robust body and a large head with a protruding lower jaw. The two dorsal fins are joined, the first has 11 spines with the final spine joined onto the second dorsal fin, which has 12 branched rays. The anal fin has a short base and has three robust spines. The caudal fin is broad and square. The body is covered with small, firmly attached scales which run up the base of the dorsal and anal fin. It has a large mouth and eyes. The preoperculum has a spiny margin while the operculum has a thick bony strut running horizontally at eye level which terminates in a spine. The back and flanks are dark brown in colour with darker spots and blotches fading to yellowish on the belly. They have also been described as being bluish grey on the back with a paler silvery sheen on the underside. The fins are blackish brown. The maximum total length is 210 centimetres (6.9 ft) with a maximum published weight of 100 kilograms (220 lb).

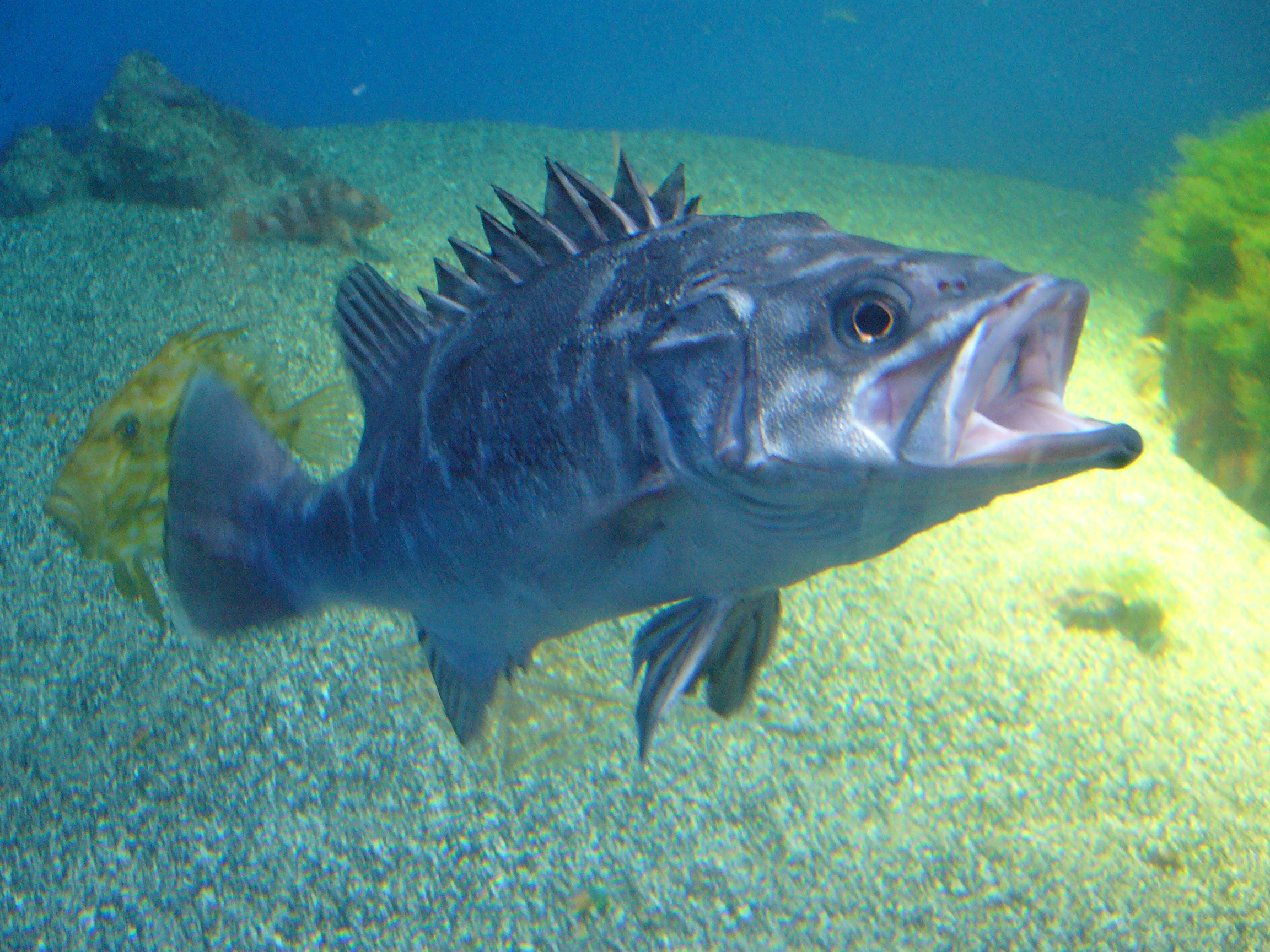
Atlantic wreckfish

== Distribution ==
The Atlantic wreckfish has a disjunct worldwide distribution. It is found in the eastern Atlantic Ocean from Norway to South Africa, into the Mediterranean and including the Macaronesian Islands and Tristan da Cunha. In the western Atlantic it is found from Newfoundland to Argentina. In the western Indian Ocean it occurs around Île Saint-Paul and Île Amsterdam and in the southwestern Pacific Ocean it is found around New Zealand. It is also found off southern Australia from just north of Perth, Western Australia to Fraser Island in Queensland, including Tasmania.

== Habitat and biology ==
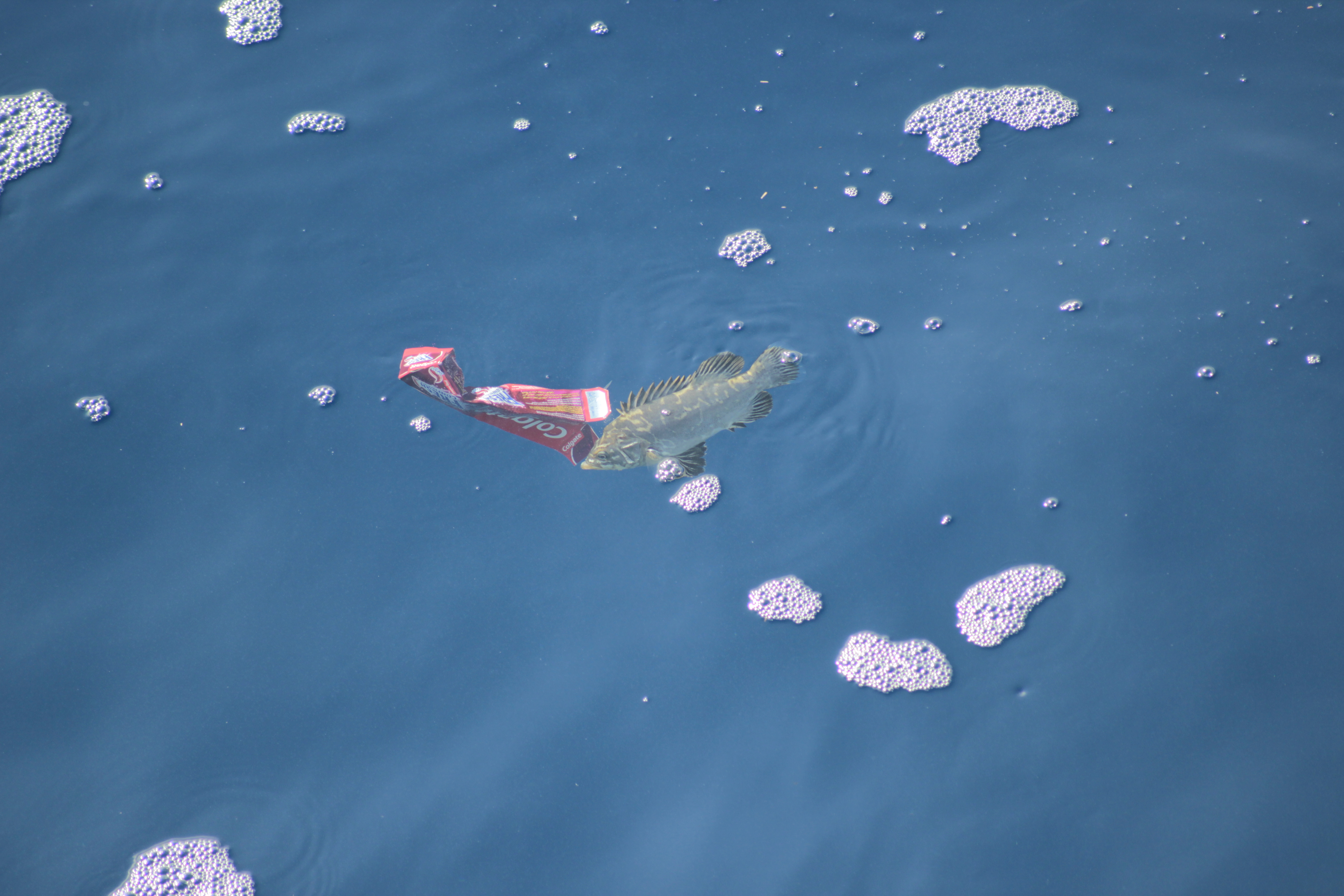
Juvenile taking shelter under a Colgate toothpaste box

Adult Atlantic wreckfish occur in and around caves, over rocky substrates and areas with densely scattered boulders, natural reefs and shipwrecks, a habitat which has led to species' common name. The adults are deep water fishes which have been recorded at depths between 200 and 600 feet (61 and 183 m). Some adults have been observed at depths approaching 500 meters in the Mediterranean.

It is normally a solitary species but the adults gather to breed during the summer. The juveniles form shoals for protection from predators which swim and hunt small fish in mid-water. Once they attain a length of 50–75 centimetres (20–30 in) they become solitary and look for a territory on the bottom. It is thought that the Atlantic wreckfish can live for as much as ninety years. They feed mainly on bottom-dwelling fish, squid and cuttlefish, but they will also take crustaceans and octopuses. They are probably best described as opportunistic, with one record of a ROV-camera filming a large congregation of small sharks feeding on a dead swordfish, with one of them being caught and swallowed whole by this species of wreckfish.

They have no known predators as adults, but juvenile specimens may be threatened by large bony fishes or sharks.

== Conservation and usage ==
The Atlantic wreckfish is a commercially valuable species and is valued as a food fish in some parts of its range. Large wreckfish may be divided into steaks, while smaller fish are filleted or baked whole. In North and South America wreckfish are sold frozen in supermarkets or grocery stores or marketed fresh from fish counters. They are caught in trawler nets or by long lines and gill nets, or occasionally by small-scale fisheries which use rod and line. Overall the stock is assessed by the IUCN as data deficient but some stocks, such as the Mediterranean stock have been assessed as being at greater risk.
