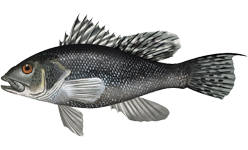

Conservation status
- Least Concern (IUCN 3.1)

Scientific classification
- Kingdom: Animalia
- Phylum: Chordata
- Class: Actinopterygii
- Division: Teleostei
- Order: Perciformes
- Family: Serranidae
- Genus: Centropristis
- Species: C. striata

Binomial name
- Centropristis striata (Linnaeus, 1758)

Synonyms
- Labrus striatus Linnaeus, 1758; Perca atraria Linnaeus, 1766; Perca furva Walbaum, 1792; Coryphaena nigrescens Bloch & Schneider, 1801; Perca varia Mitchill, 1814; Centropristis melana Ginsburg, 1952

= Black sea bass =

Species of fish

The black sea bass (Centropristis striata) is a species of marine ray-finned fish, a sea bass from the subfamily Serraninae which is part of the family Serranidae, which also includes the groupers and anthias. It is found in the western Atlantic Ocean, where it is an important species for commercial and recreational fisheries.

== Taxonomy ==
The black sea bass was first formally described as Labrus striatus by Carolus Linnaeus in the tenth edition of his Systema Naturae published in 1758, Linnaeus gave the type locality as America. When the French anatomist and zoologist Georges Cuvier created the genus Centropristis he used Bloch and Schneider's 1801 Coryphaenus nigrescens as the type species for the new genus, this is a synonym of Linnaeus's Labrus striatus so the black sea bass is the type species of the genus Centropristis. The generic name is a compound of the Greek words kentron meaning "sting" and pristis which means "saw".

== Distribution ==
The black sea bass is found in the western Atlantic Ocean from Nova Scotia south along the eastern coast of North America as far as the Florida Keys and into the Gulf of Mexico as far as Louisiana where the western limit is just to the west of the Mississippi Delta.

== Description ==
This species attains a maximum total length of 66 centimetres (26 in), however they are normally found at a total length of around 30 centimetres (12 in), and a maximum published weight of 4.1 kilograms (9.0 lb).

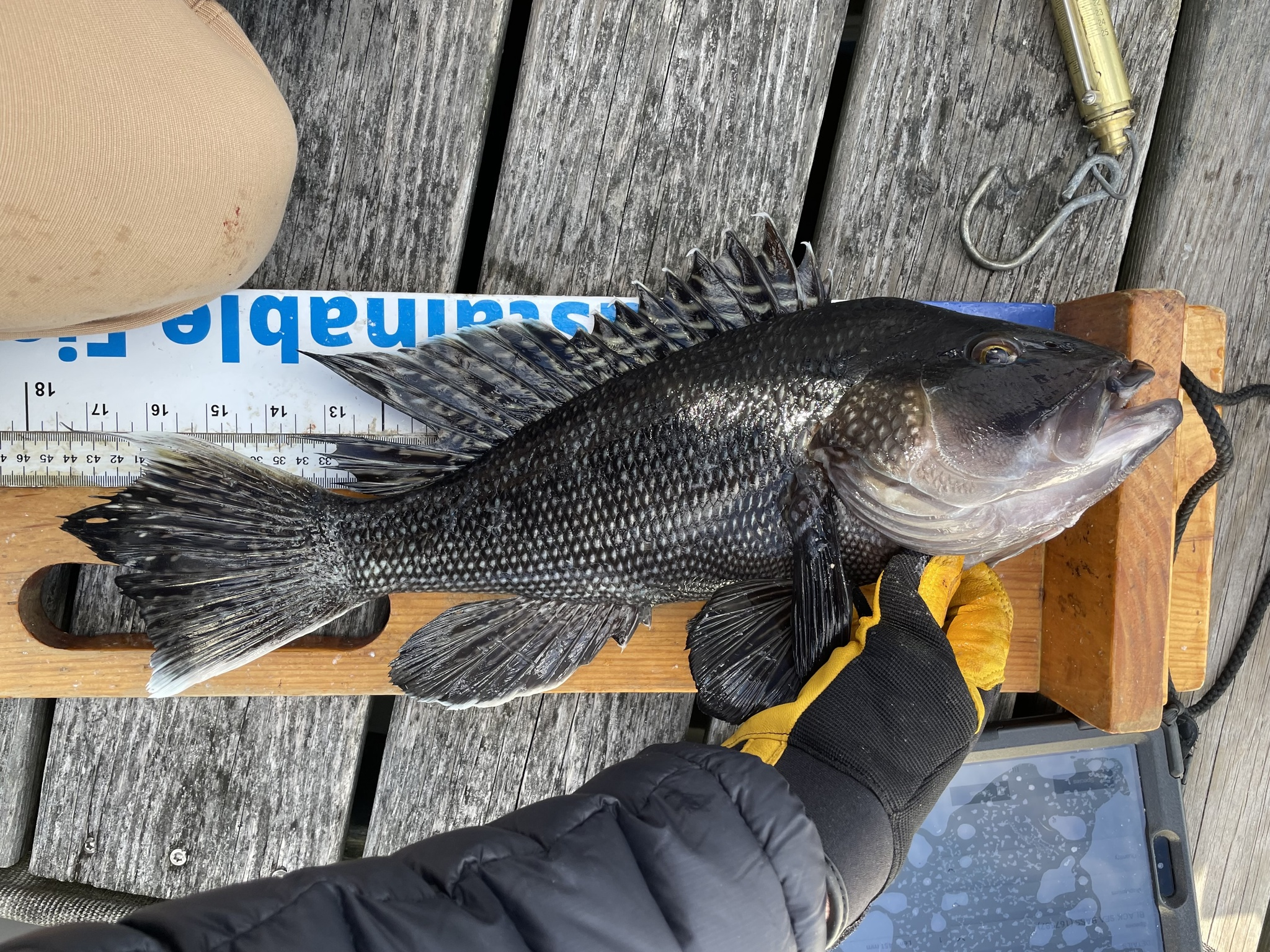
In Connecticut

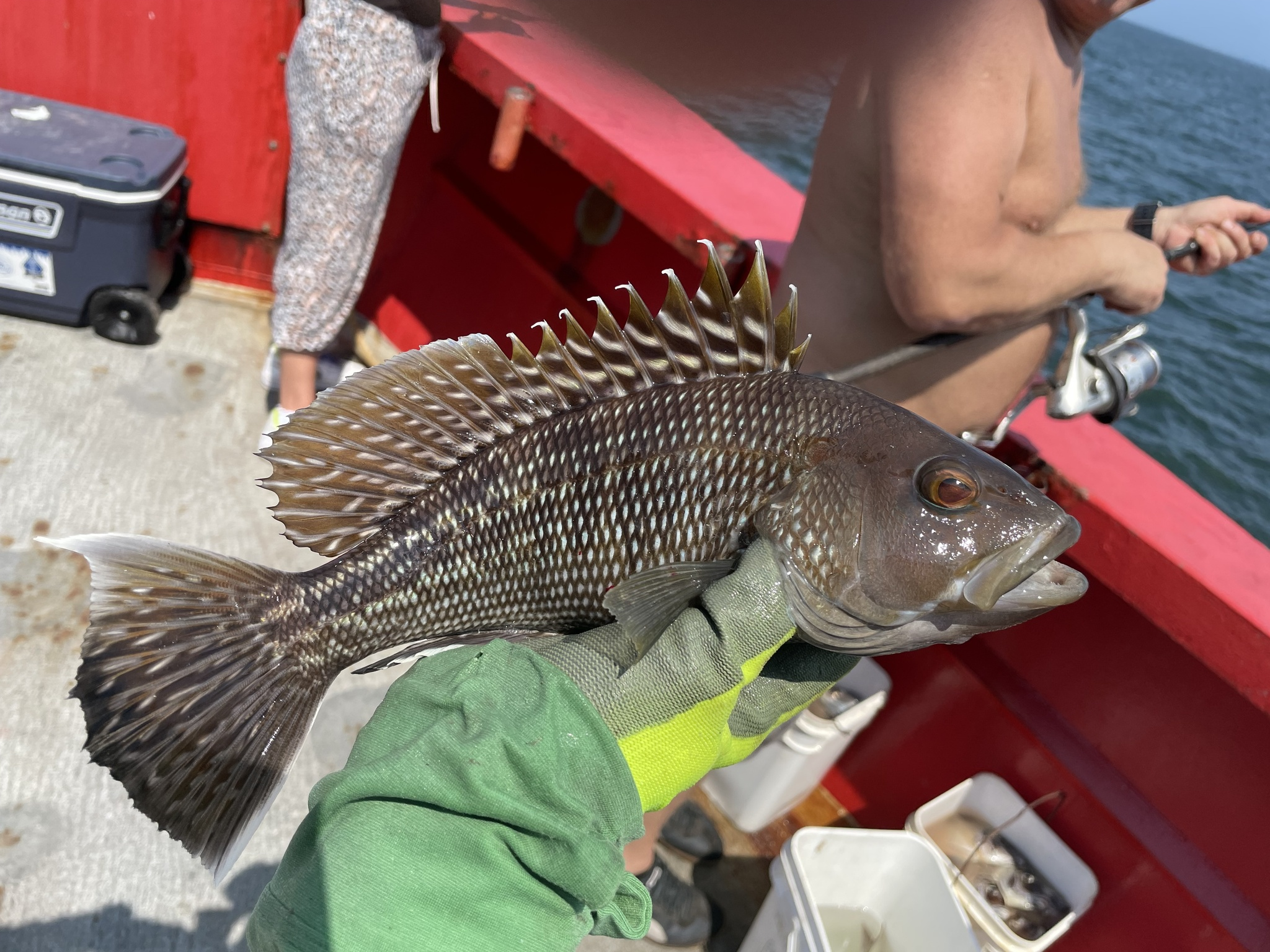
In New York

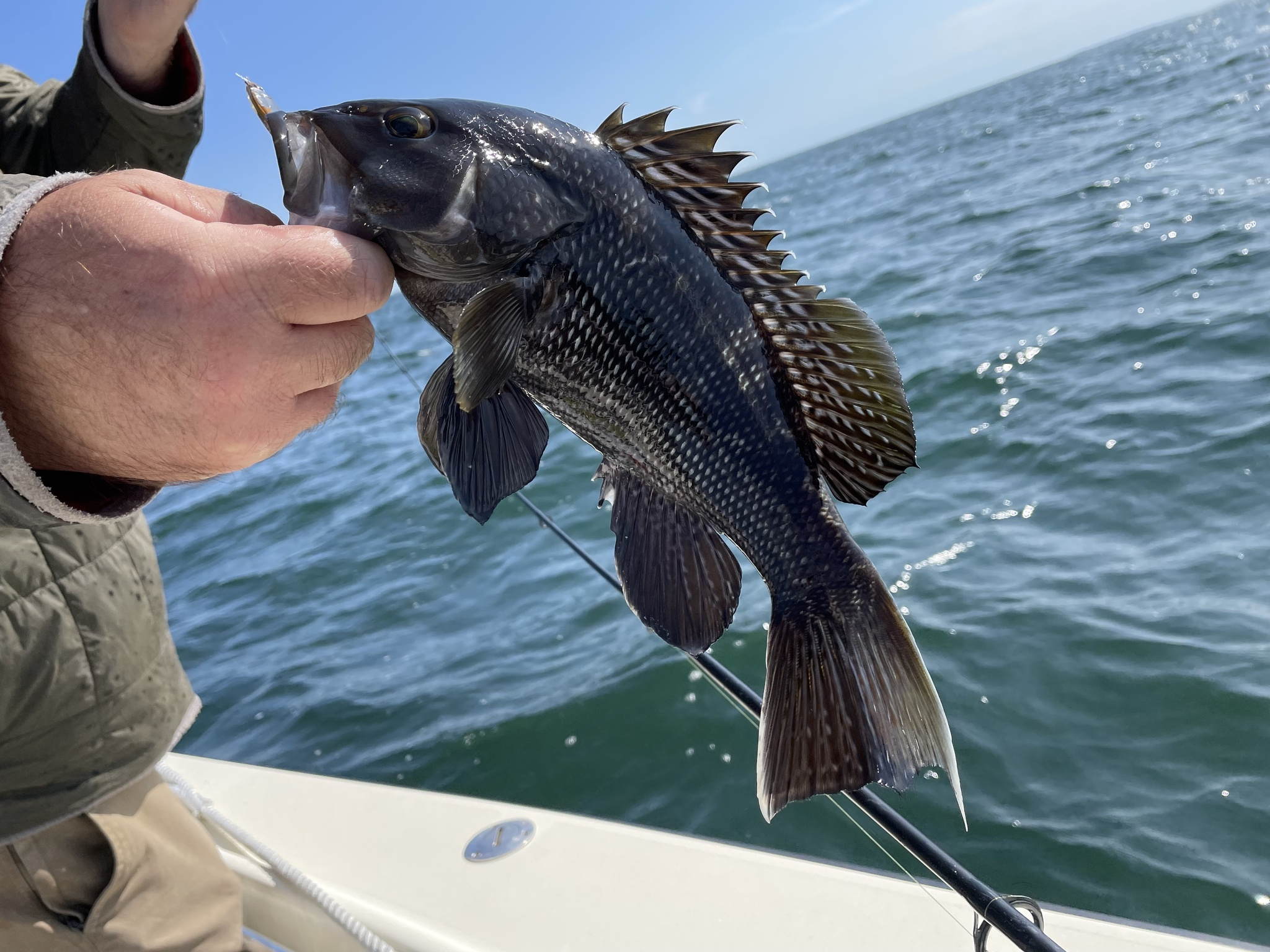
In New York

The black sea bass has an oblong, laterally compressed body. It has a large mouth, armed with bands of teeth on the jaw and with a triangular patch of teeth in the front part roof of the mouth and more teeth along the sides of that area, the mouth extending as far as below the middle of the eye. The preopercle has fine serrations on its margin and is evenly rounded, while the gill cover bears three flat spines. The dorsal fin has ten spines, the front spines being longer than the rearmost, and 11 soft rays. The membranes between the spines of the dorsal fin are deeply notched. The anal fin has three spines and seven soft rays. The caudal fin has three lobes created by the long and pointed upper, middle and lower rays.

The colour pattern is normally smoky grey, dusky brown or blue-black on the back and upper body, fading towards the underside. In the middle of each scale there is a pale blue to white spot and these form longitudinal stripes along the back and flanks. The dorsal fin has a series of white spots and bands along its length. The flanks can frequently appear mottled or have dark and light vertical barring. In the breeding season the males develop bright fluorescent blue and green around the eyes and nape and a hump on the head contrasting with the paler and duller females which are brownish or blue-grey in colour. The juveniles are found in four colour phases; the first is an overall light grey phase which has small dark spots, there is a dark phase which has pale white spots, a striped phase with a longitudinal dark stripe and a barred phase which has six vertical bars.

== Habitat and biology ==
The black sea bass is commonly found in the vicinity of rock jetties and over rocky substrates in shallow water, although they have also been recorded in deeper, offshore waters to depths of 130 metres (430 ft). They spend most of their time near the bottom where they frequently aggregate around features on the bottom such as piles of rocks, wrecks and man-made structures. It is often encountered resting in either a head-down or head-up position. Normally the dorsal fin is folded down but will be raised and spread out as an aggressive signal to other members of its own species. The juveniles remain in the protected estuarine waters where they are found around man-made structures, wrecks and over shell substrates.

=== Lifecycle and reproduction ===
Females live to around 8 years of age while males can live to 12 years old. This species is a slow growing fish and they reach sexual maturity at between one and three years old. They are protogynous hermaphrodites, the majority of them begin life as females and then change to males. The stimulus for the change is not known but it is thought that the largest females change sex in response to a shortage of males within a spawning group. These fishes spawn from January to July with the smaller females producing as few as 30,000 eggs while the larger females can produce 500,000 eggs. Their eggs are pelagic and have a diameter of 0.9-1.0 mm. They hatch 75 hours after laying, in water temperatures of 16 °C (61 °F). The larvae are pelagic until they grow to around 13 millimetres (0.51 in) in length when they change to a demersal or estuarine habit.

=== Ecology ===
This predatory species has a broad diet which includes crabs, shrimps, barnacles, worms, tunicates, small fish and bivalves. They are also preyed on by larger fish and their known predators include monkfish (Lophius americanus), spotted hake (Urophycis regia), summer flounder (Paralichthys dentatus), striped bass (Morone saxatilis), bluefish (Pomatomus saltatrix), weakfish (Cynoscion regalis), little skate (Leucoraja erinacea), spiny dogfish (Squalus acanthias), bignose shark (Carcharhinus altimus) and dusky shark (Carcharhinus obscurus).

== Utilisation ==
This species has lean, white flesh which has a relatively firm texture, breaks into small flakes and has a delicate flavour. These small size of most of the fish available means that they are often cooked whole. They are caught using otter trawls, hook and line and in pots or traps. They have shown some promise in aquaculture but have not been farmed commercially yet. In sheltered environments the black sea bass can attain a high growth rate but this does not lead to long-term survival of their populations.

=== Fisheries ===
Black sea bass are highly sought after by recreational and commercial fisherman. There are two populations identified for fisheries management. NOAA Fisheries, the Mid-Atlantic Fishery Management Council, and the Atlantic States Marine Fisheries Commission cooperate in the management of the black sea bass fishery in the seas north of Cape Hatteras in North Carolina while NOAA Fisheries and the South Atlantic Fishery Management Council manage the fishery south of Cape Hatteras. Management includes catch limits, permits and a close season.

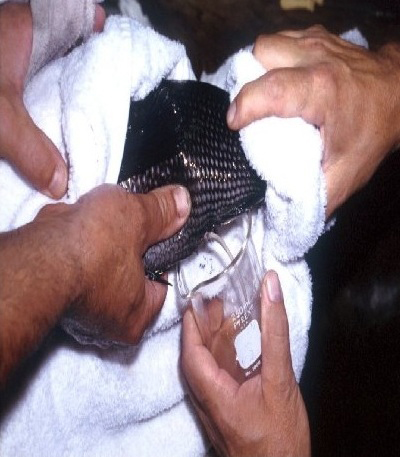
Adult black sea bass being stripped for eggs

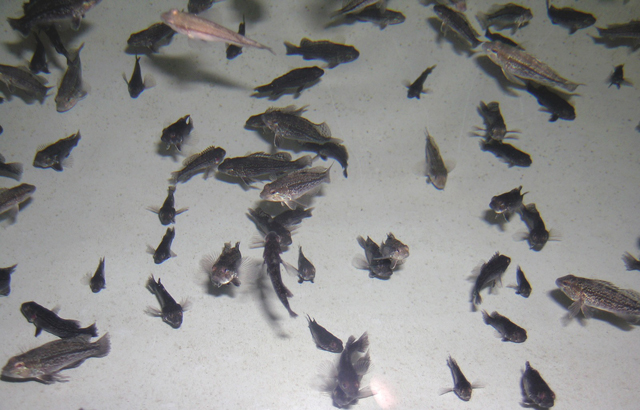
Juveniles

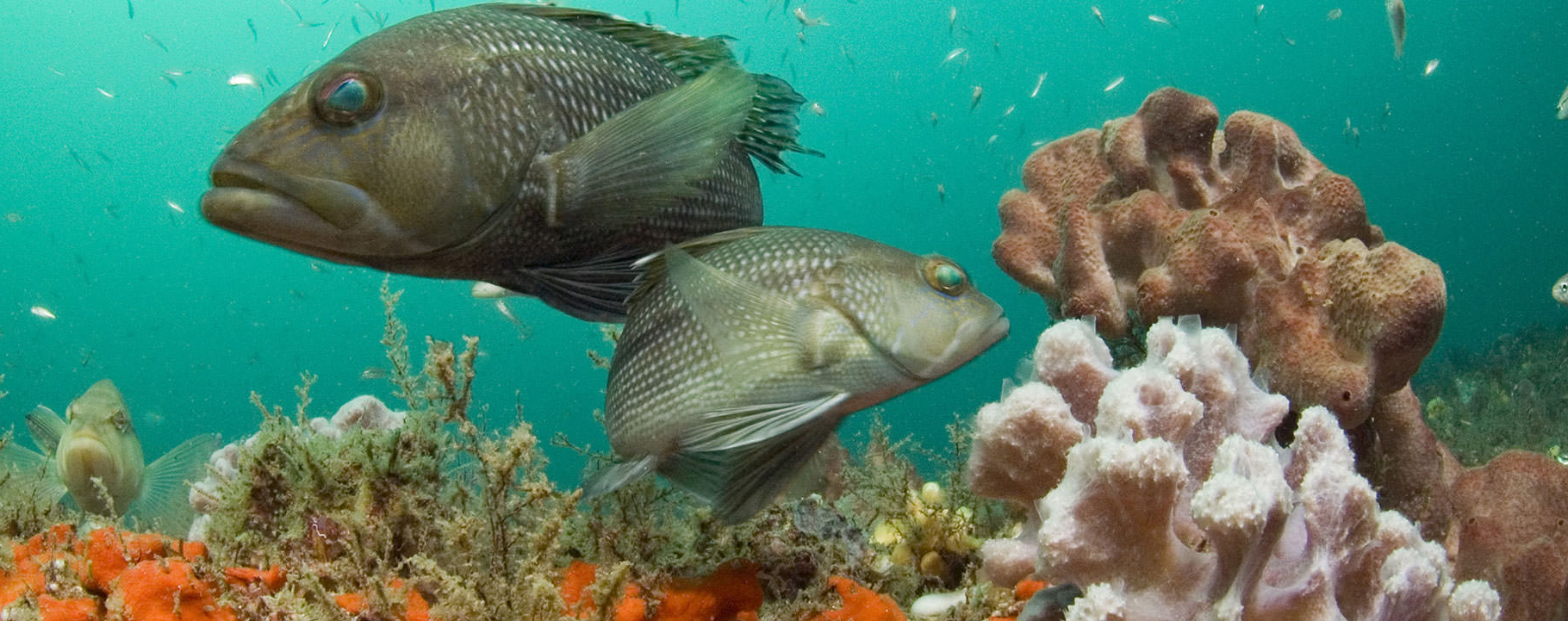
Black sea bass at Gray's Reef National Marine Sanctuary in Georgia
