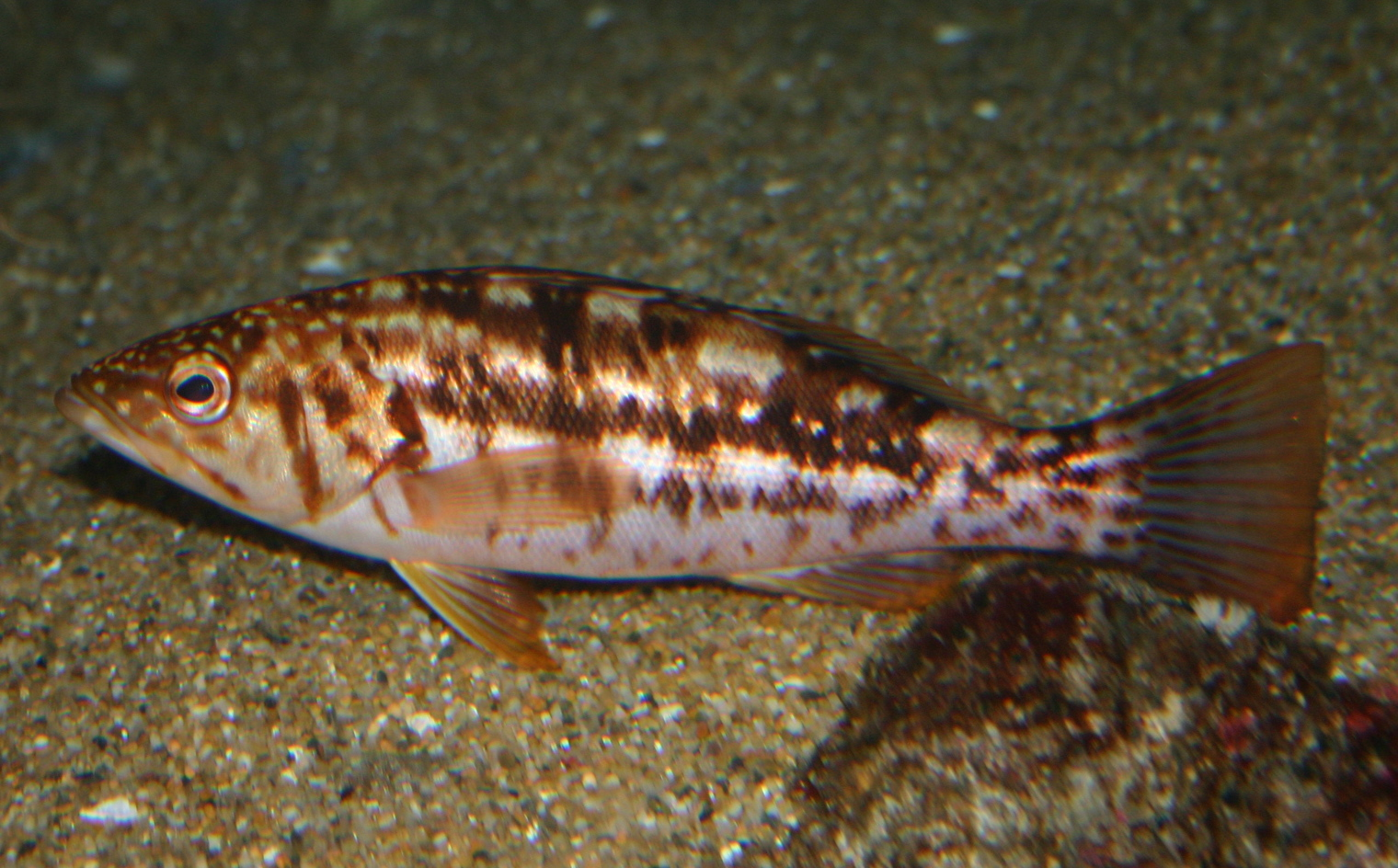

Conservation status
- Least Concern (IUCN 3.1)

Scientific classification
- Kingdom: Animalia
- Phylum: Chordata
- Class: Actinopterygii
- Division: Teleostei
- Order: Perciformes
- Family: Serranidae
- Genus: Paralabrax
- Species: P. clathratus

Binomial name
- Paralabrax clathratus (Girard, 1854)

Synonyms
- Labrax clathratus Girard, 1854

= Paralabrax clathratus =

Species of fish

Paralabrax clathratus, the kelp bass, bull bass or calico bass, is a species of marine ray-finned fish, from the subfamily Serraninae, classified as part of the family Serranidae which includes the groupers and anthias. It is found in the eastern North Pacific Ocean where it is an important species for both recreational and commercial fisheries.

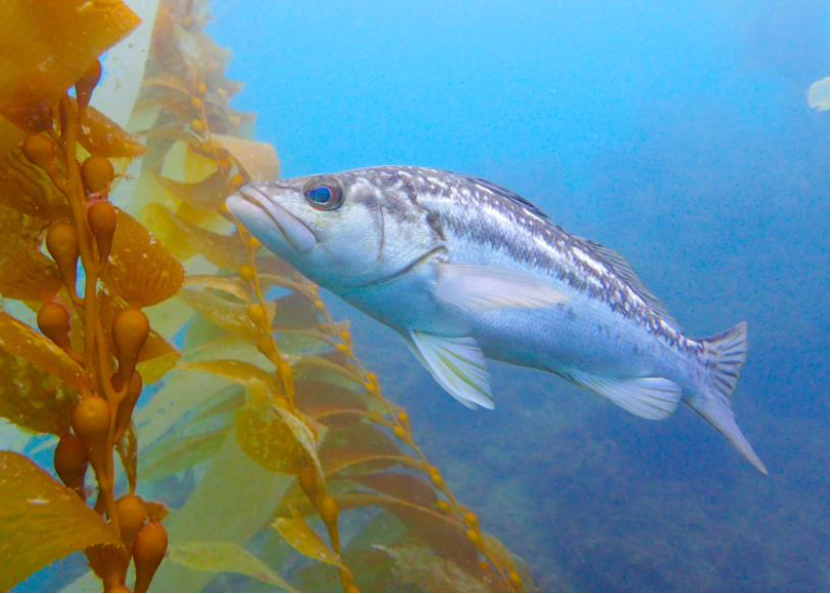
Photo of Paralabrax clathratus in the wild.

== Description ==
Paralabrax clathratus has an elongate, relatively deep, compressed body with a pointed snout and a large, downturned mouth. The mouth extends back as far as the centre line of the pupil and the lower mandible protrudes to form part of the snout. There are teeth all over the roof of the mouth. The margins of the preopercle have fine serrations. There is a large spine on the edge of the gill cover. The dorsal fin has 10 spines and 13–14 soft rays, the 3rd and 4th spine are the longest, both being nearly twice the height of the 2nd spine. The anal fin has 3 spines and 7 soft rays. The caudal fin is truncated, although the margin can be wavy. The juvenile fish are light brown in colour, while the adults are brown to olive-green fading ventrally The dorsal part of the head has a mottling of light yellow spots while the dorsal part of the body is patterned with black, white, and/or olive green blotches. Along the back there are rows of white, rectangle shaped spots. All of the fins are yellow at the tips. The males may develop an orange tint on their lower jaw and chin during mating season. Kelp bass can also change color depending on their surroundings. For example, fish moving from the kelp forest to the open ocean can change from being dark green or brown, to being pale green. Similar color changes have occurred when kelp bass were artificially removed from their habitat and placed into pens for study. Due to a lack of sexual dimorphism, it is impossible to tell males and females apart by sight. Paralabrax clathratus may be phenotypically similar to other north American species of bass such as the spotted bass, white bass, or yellow bass. A distinguishing feature of this species from other sea bass is that the kelp bass has piebald or multi coloured spotting under the belly, which is why it is alternatively called calico bass. They are also by far the largest species in their genus. They attain a maximum total length of 72 centimetres (28 in) and a maximum published weight of 7.0 kilograms (15.4 lb). Approximately 40% of all kelp bass alive at any given time are 200 to 250 millimeters in length. Size data was collected using entrapment surveys of 38,875 individuals over the course of 39 years.

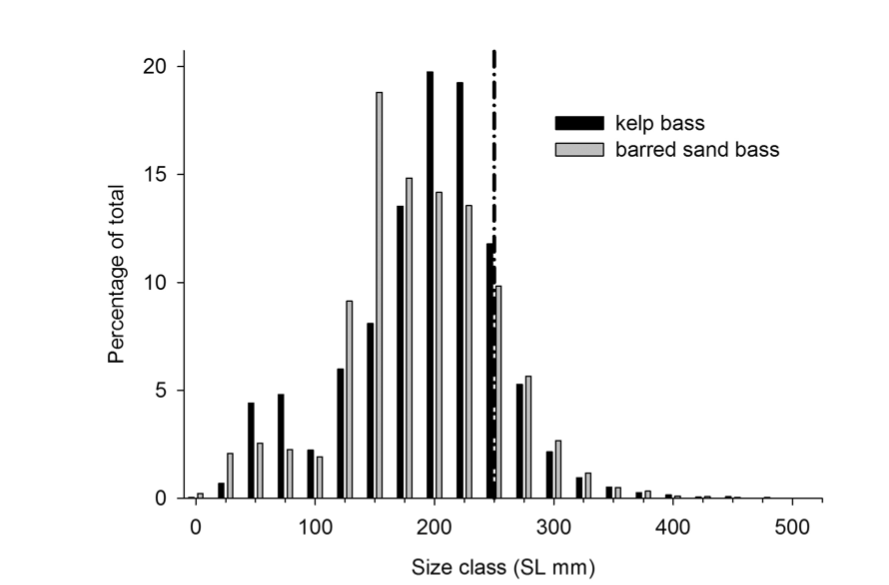
Length frequency distribution for a population of 17,033 kelp bass. Measured using power plant entrapment monitoring from 1979 to 2010. The dashed line represents the minimum size limit to keep a catch. (Measurements do not include caudal fin).

== Distribution ==
Paralabrax clathratus is found in the eastern North Pacific Ocean off the western coast of North America. Its range extends from the central California south to the southern tip of Baja California. It was formerly found as far north as the mouth of the Columbia River on the boundary between Oregon and Washington State but it is now rare anywhere north of Point Conception in California.

== Habitat and biology ==
Paralabrax clathratus is found at depths between 0 and 61 metres (0 and 200 ft), though they typically remain between 2.7 and 21.3 meters below the surface. They show a strong association with kelp and are almost always found inhabiting kelp forests and estuaries. They can also reside in nearshore rocky-reefs. They utilize a variety of micro-habitats within this habitat for feeding, shelter and breeding, for example the juveniles will hide among the blades of kelp and among seaweed in the intertidal zone. The adults prefer deeper water, venturing into rocky habitats where their larger size gives them some protection against predation. The kelp bass spawns in the late spring to the early autumn, with spawning season peaking in the summer. When spawning the adults form aggregations of up to 200 fish, but more commonly numbering around 50 individuals. Because of these aggregations, Kelp bass are most commonly fished during the months of June, July, and August. Virtually none are caught from October through April, when spawning aggregations cease. The aggregations are normally formed around a natural or man-made structure such as the canopy of the kelp forest or piers and occur at depths of 8 to 18 metres (26 to 59 ft). The mating fish break off into smaller groups in which a gravid female will swim to the substrate and males will perform courtship displays by rubbing themselves against her flanks and nibbling at her fins. While they are mating, the females change colour to dark grey or black on the upper body, and bright white on their underparts, while males also darken to an overall charcoal colour, broken by black vertical bars and white spots. Additionally, about 75% of males develop an orange snout during mating season. The males and females release the sperm and eggs at the same time, normally spawning between 32 minutes before sunset and 120 minutes after sunset. They are capable of releasing eggs and sperm multiple times in a single evening. There is no known correlation between male size and participation in spawning aggregations. Interestingly, spawning activity tends to peak each month around the time of the full moon. The reason for this remains a mystery, though it has been suggested that spawning during the high tides that are associated with the full moon may increase fertilization success. After spawning the eggs hatch within 36 hours. There is then a pelagic larval phase which lasts for 25–36 days, before the fish "settle", or transition out of the larval phase and develop into juveniles. Juveniles stay in the kelp forest to protect themselves from predators. As they mature, they venture father into the open ocean. They grow an average of 0.59 millimeters per day for the first 90 days of their lives. Most of the kelp bass's growth takes place during the first few years of life, but they have indeterminate growth. Males are sexually mature at between 2 and 4 years old and half of them are mature when they have attained 22 centimetres (8.7 in) in length. Females are mature at 2 to 5 years old and half of them are mature at 22.6 centimetres (8.9 in). Male and female kelp bass grow in length at the same rate. Their maximum recorded lifespan is 34 years, but most do not live for anywhere near this long. Using this maximum age as a reference, studies found that, on average, about 17.6 percent of kelp bass die from natural causes each year. This does not include death by fishing. They rarely live past age 15 in the wild. In order to collect data on the growth and life history of Paralabrax clathratus, scientists dove along transects and recorded the number of fish that they saw within a 3-meter radius and their sizes. Fish that were between 1.5 and 2 centimeters in length were considered to be newly recruited, fish from 2.1 cm to 10 cm in length were considered to be juveniles, and fish from 10.1 cm to 15 cm were considered to be subadults. Any fish that was longer than 15 cm was assumed to be a fully grown adult.

This species is largely diurnal, but can remain active both day and night. Individuals are faithful to their home ranges, which average around 3,000 square metres (32,000 ft^{2}), but can be anywhere from 33 to 11,224 square meters in size. They may remain in the same area for up to 3 years. Barron sand channels can act as a barrier for their movement. Data on the movement and range of Paralabrax clathratus is collected using acoustic tracking. Essentially, individuals are caught and given anesthesia. An acoustic transmitter is then inserted between the pelvic fins and vent. The fish are then weighed, measured, and tagged for external identification. After the fish are released, tracking is carried out on a small boat equipped with a hydrophone and receiver. The location of each fish is recorded every 15 minutes for up to 1 month. The younger fish are less site faithful than the older individuals and will move greater distances. This may be because their diet changes as they mature. The juveniles are more diurnal as zooplankton is more abundant during the day and their small size means they are subjected to greater predation so they take sanctuary among the kelp. Sub-adults are more active at night and have a more diverse diet with their preferred prey being more active at night. As adults, kelp bass feed on small fish, crustaceans, mollusks, and other small primary consumers. In winter, their feeding options are far more limited than in summer, and many Kelp Bass go hungry. When meat is unavailable, they are sometimes forced to rely on kelp and algae. The primary predator of adult kelp bass is the giant sea bass (Stereolepis gigas), whose population has increased significantly in recent years. Kelp bass are normally solitary, but will form aggregations in pelagic waters or spawning and to hunt as a group on bait fish. The main prey of juveniles are plankton and small benthic invertebrates, including small crustaceans, brittle stars and small fishes. All ages will feed on zooplankton if it is abundant.

Paralabrax clathratus swimming inside giant kelp

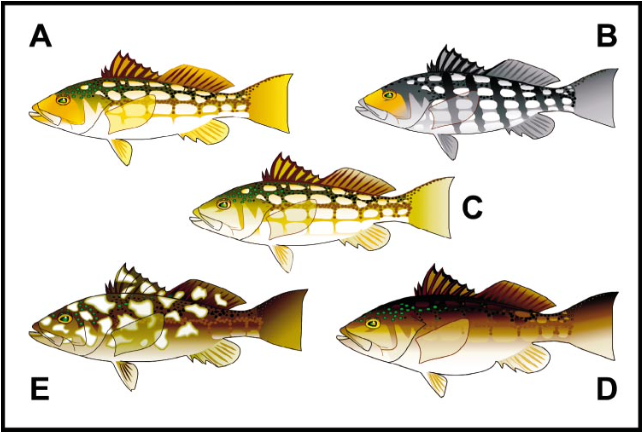
Various coloration patterns of Paralabrax clathratus

== Conservation ==
Paralabrax clathratus is ranked as the second most abundant California shallow water generalist and it is not officially considered to be endangered in any part of its habitat. However, its survival is threatened by fluctuations in ocean surface temperatures and overfishing. Currently, marine protected areas (MPAs) are the only places in which fishing for kelp bass is illegal. As of 2024, only 16.1 percent of California's territorial waters are designated as MPAs. From 1974 to 2014, a 97 percent reduction in the abundance of kelp bass was observed in southern California using entrapment monitoring data. Ocean warming and acidification can wreak havoc on kelp forest ecosystems. The excessive heat and lack of nutrients can cause kelp fronds to wilt on mass. Primary consumers that feed on kelp will die out after losing their main food source. Secondary consumers such as the kelp bass may soon follow. A similar chain reaction can occur if industrial waste or sewage runs off into the ocean and poisons the kelp. Kelp forests along the west coast are also threatened by invasive species such as Strongylocentrotus purpuratus (purple sea urchins). This species reproduces fast and can devour kelp from its roots at an alarming rate; particularly when its main predators, the sea stars, are decimated by a disease called Sea Star Wasting Syndrome. If purple sea urchins eat all the kelp, other herbivores will die of starvation, and Paralabrax clathratus will surely follow, as they cannot ingest the urchins due to their spiny exteriors. Another invasive species along the coast of California and Baja is wreaking havoc on kelp bass "recruitment", which is when newly settled juveniles move into their preferred habitats. This species is a type of macroalgae called Sargassum horneri. It has replaced the native giant kelp Macrocystis pyrifera, which has declined substantially due to increasing ocean temperatures. Studies have shown that Kelp bass are thirty times more abundant on M. pyrifera then on S. horneri. This may be due to the fact that S. horneri is shorter and much less dense than M. pyrifera, and provides less cover from predators. S. horneri may also produce chemicals that deter kelp bass or their prey. Because kelp bass spend their entire lifecycle in the ocean, they are not affected by dams on rivers. No-take marine reserves have been successful in helping to preserve their abundance, as they rarely leave their home ranges.

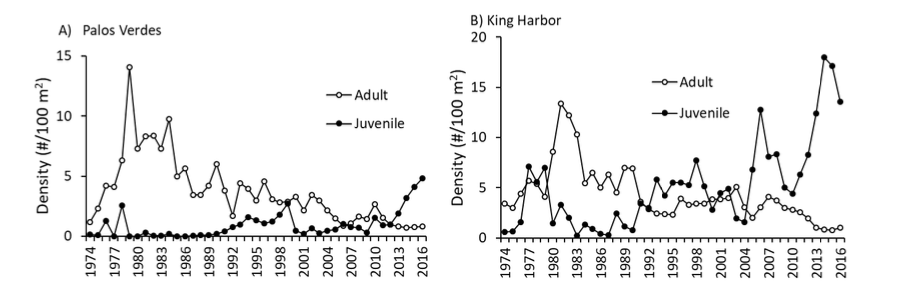
Density of kelp bass over time in Palos Verdes and King Harbor

== Taxonomy ==
Paralabrax clathratus was first formally described in 1854 as Labrax clathratus by the French ichthyologist and herpetologist Charles Frédéric Girard (1822–1895) with the type locality given as San Diego, California. The generic name Paralabrax is a compound of the Greek para meaning "the side of" and labrax, meaning a fish such as the European sea bass (Dicentrarchus labrax), the specific name is Latin and means "latticed", a reference to the patterning of this species.

== Utilisation ==
Before colonization, all species of bass were an important food source for west coast indigenous peoples. Kelp bass were a particularly vital staple for the Chumash tribe, who historically lived along the central coast of California. Paralabrax clathratus is considered excellent eating and there is an important commercial fishery in Mexico. The species is also an important quarry species for recreational anglers. In California no commercial fishery exists. Here the species is exploited only by recreational fisheries and is one of the most sought after game fishes. In the years after the Second World War, Paralabrax clathratus was subjected to heavy pressure from sports fisheries. Its fishery began to deteriorate until, in 1953, size limits and a ban on the sale of the species were introduced. Since then, the fishery has recovered. Tighter regulations have continued to help protect the kelp bass. In southern California, only 5 individuals of any of the three bass species that reside off the coast may be caught per person per day. Any Bass less than 14 inches long must be released back into the water. Even after being released, there is evidence to suggest that Kelp Bass remain stressed for many hours after capture. Symptoms of stress can include elevated levels of lactate, glucose, and cortisol circulation. High levels of lactate may be linked to greater mortality rates post release. Interestingly, larger individuals tend to recover more rapidly and experience less stress in the first place when caught and released.
