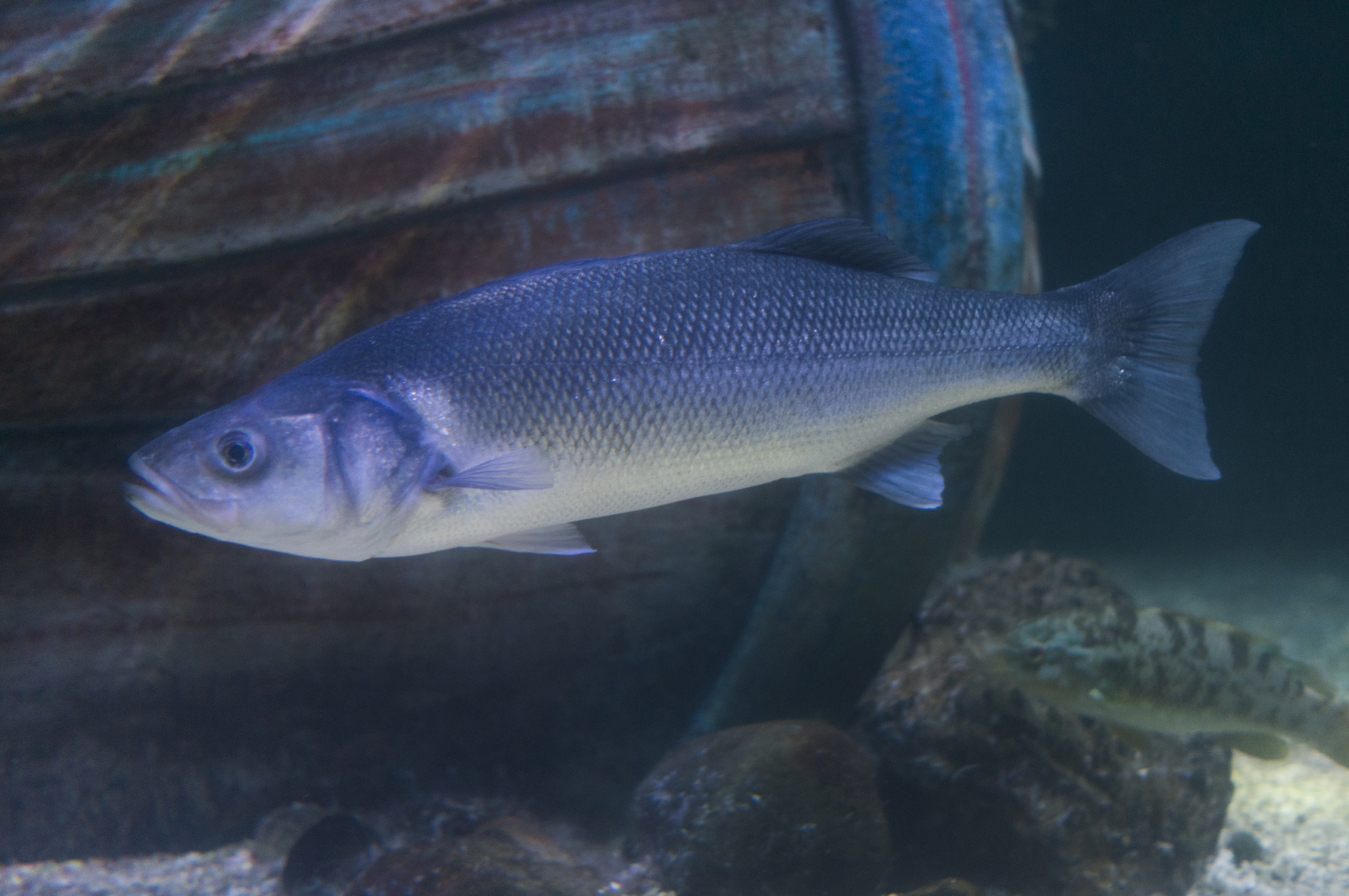

Conservation status
- Near Threatened (IUCN 3.1)

Scientific classification
- Kingdom: Animalia
- Phylum: Chordata
- Class: Actinopterygii
- Division: Teleostei
- Order: Acanthuriformes
- Family: Moronidae
- Genus: Dicentrarchus
- Species: D. labrax

Binomial name
- Dicentrarchus labrax (Linnaeus, 1758)
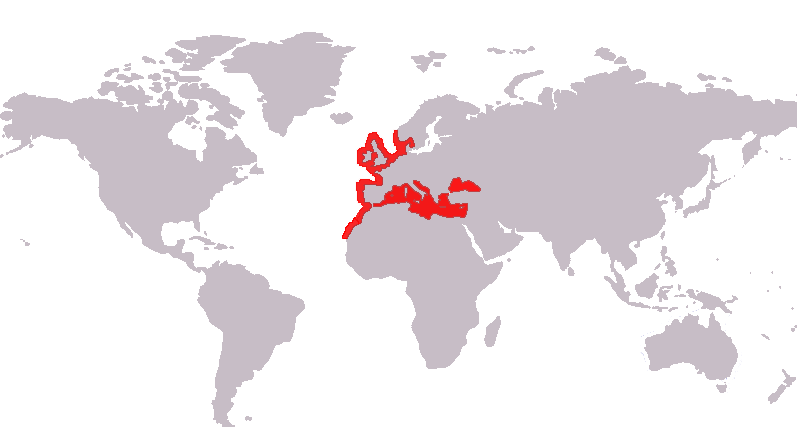
- Distribution of European seabass

Synonyms
- click to expand: Perca labrax Linnaeus, 1758; Labrax labrax (Linnaeus, 1758); Morone labrax (Linnaeus, 1758); Roccus labrax (Linnaeus, 1758); Sciaena labrax (Linnaeus, 1758); Sciaena diacantha Bloch, 1792; Labrax diacanthus (Bloch, 1792); Perca diacantha (Bloch, 1792); Centropomus lupus Lacépède, 1802; Dicentrarchus lupus (Lacepède, 1802); Labrax lupus (Lacepède, 1802); Centropomus mullus Lacepède, 1802; Perca elongata É. Geoffroy Saint-Hilaire, 1817; Dicentrarchus elongatus (É. Geoffroy Saint-Hilaire, 1817); Labrax elongatus (É. Geoffroy Saint-Hilaire, 1817); Perca sinuosa É. Geoffroy Saint-Hilaire, 1817; Labrax vulgaris Guérin-Méneville, 1829-38; Labrax linnei Malm, 1877

= European seabass =

Species of fish

European seabass (Dicentrarchus labrax), also known as branzino, European bass, sea bass, common bass, white bass, capemouth, white salmon, white mullet, sea dace, levrek or loup de mer, or lavraki (λαβράκι) is a primarily ocean-going fish native to the waters off Europe's western and southern and Africa's northern coasts, though it can also be found in shallow coastal waters and river mouths during the summer months and late autumn. It is one of only six species in its family, Moronidae, collectively called the temperate basses.

It is fished and raised commercially and is considered the most important fish currently cultured in the Mediterranean. In Ireland and the United Kingdom, the popular restaurant fish sold and consumed as sea bass is exclusively the European bass. In North America, it is widely known by one of its Italian names, branzino.

European seabass is a slow-growing species that takes several years to reach adulthood. An adult European seabass usually weighs around 2.5 kg (5 lb 8 oz). European seabass can reach measurements of up to 1 m (3 ft 3 in) in length and 12 kg (26 lb) in weight, though the most common size is only about half of that at 0.5 m (1 ft 8 in). Individuals are silvery grey and sometimes a dark-bluish color on the back.

Juveniles form schools and feed on invertebrates, while adults are less social and prefer to consume other fish. They are generally found in the littoral zone near the banks of rivers, lagoons, and estuaries during the summer and migrate offshore during the winter. European sea bass feed on prawns, crabs and small fish. It is a sought-after game fish and is listed as Near Threatened by the International Union for Conservation of Nature due to a decreasing population.

== Taxonomy and phylogeny ==
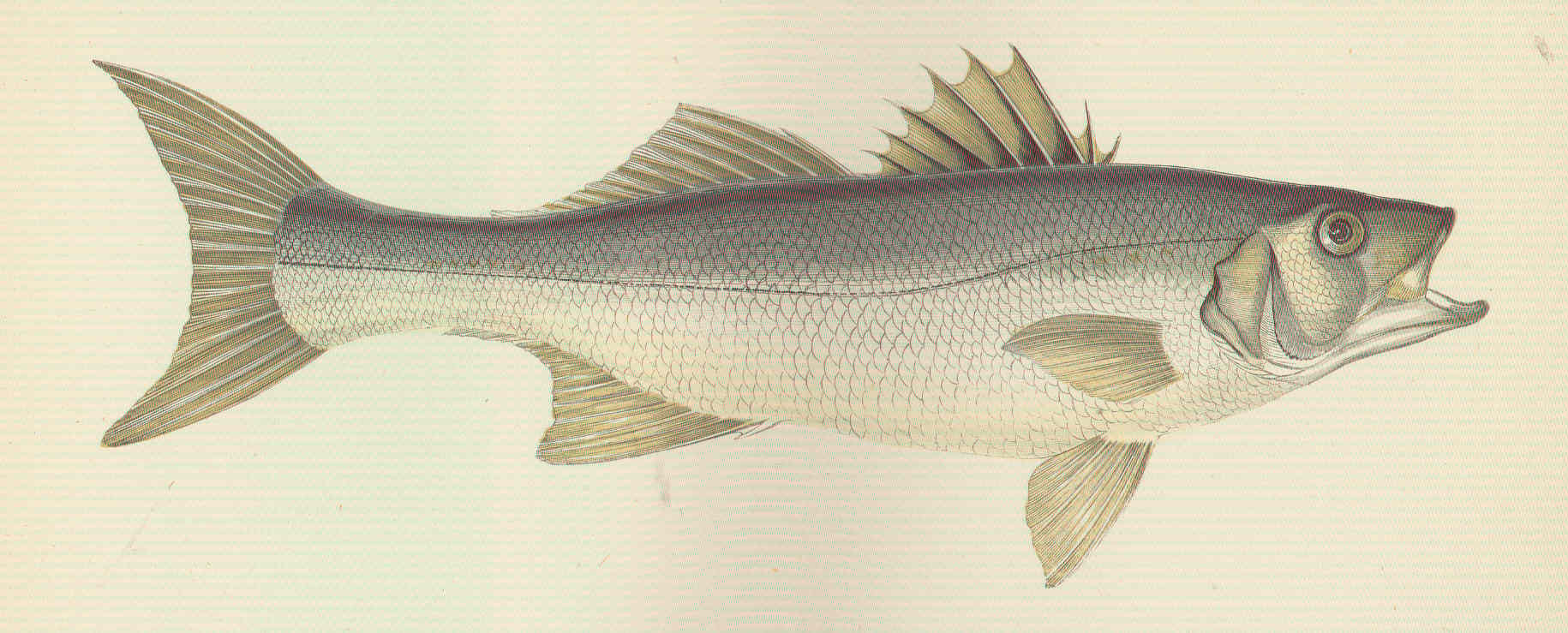
1877 illustration by Jonathan Couch

The European seabass was first described in 1758 by Swedish zoologist Carl Linnaeus in his work Systema Naturae. He named it Perca labrax. In the century and a half following, it was classified under a variety of new synonyms, with Dicentrarchus labrax winning out as the accepted name in 1987. Its generic name, Dicentrarchus, derives from Greek, from the presence of two anal spines, "di" meaning two, "kentron" meaning sting, and "archos" meaning anus. The European bass is sold under dozens of common names in various languages. In the British Isles, it is known as the "European bass," "European seabass," "common bass," "capemouth," "king of the mullets," "sea bass," "sea dace," "sea perch," "white mullet," "white salmon," or simply "bass".

- - - - - M. mississippiensis
        - M. chrysops
      - M. americana
      - M. saxatillis
    - D. punctatus
  - D. labrax

Phylogenetic tree of Moronidae based on the mt-nd6 protein

There are two genetically distinct populations of wild European seabass. The first is found in the northeast Atlantic Ocean, and the second is in the western Mediterranean Sea. The two populations are separated by a relatively narrow distance in a region known as the Almeria-Oran oceanographic front, located east of the Spanish city of Almería. The exact reason for this separation is unknown, as the geographic divide should not account for the lack of gene flow between the two populations. The larval stage of the European seabass can last up to three months, during which it cannot swim well, and even a small amount of water flow should transport some individuals between the two regions. In addition, juveniles can survive temperature and salinity changes, and adults can migrate hundreds of kilometres.

== Distribution and habitat ==
European seabass habitats include estuaries, lagoons, coastal waters, and rivers. It is found in a large part of the eastern Atlantic Ocean, from southern Norway to Senegal. It can also be found in the entire Mediterranean Sea and in the southern Black Sea but is absent from the Baltic Sea. It has entered the Red Sea through the Suez Canal as an anti-Lessepsian migrant. It is a seasonally migratory species, moving further winter spawning grounds during at least one month before moving towards their summer feeding areas.

== Diet and behaviour ==
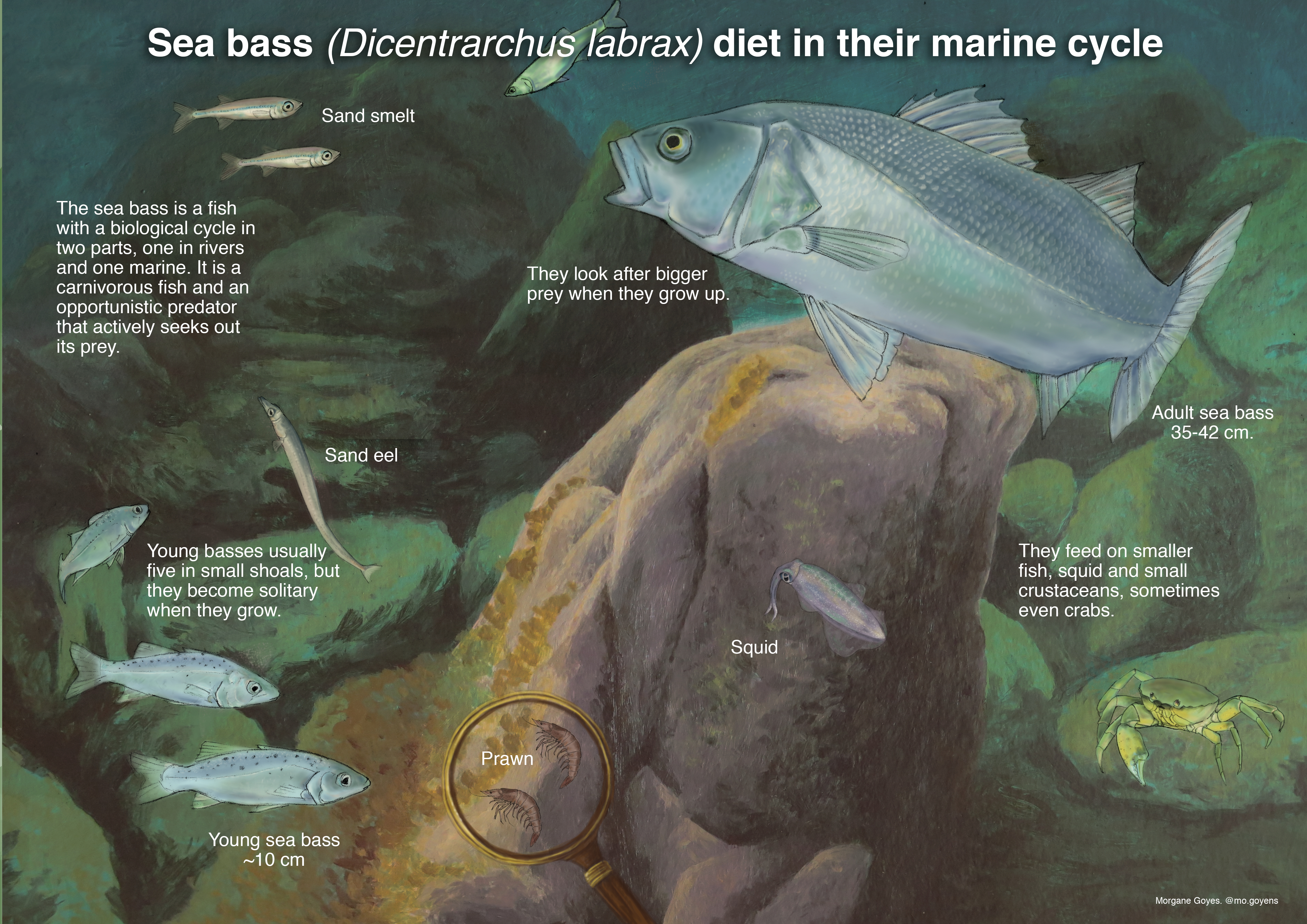
European bass in their maritime life cycle

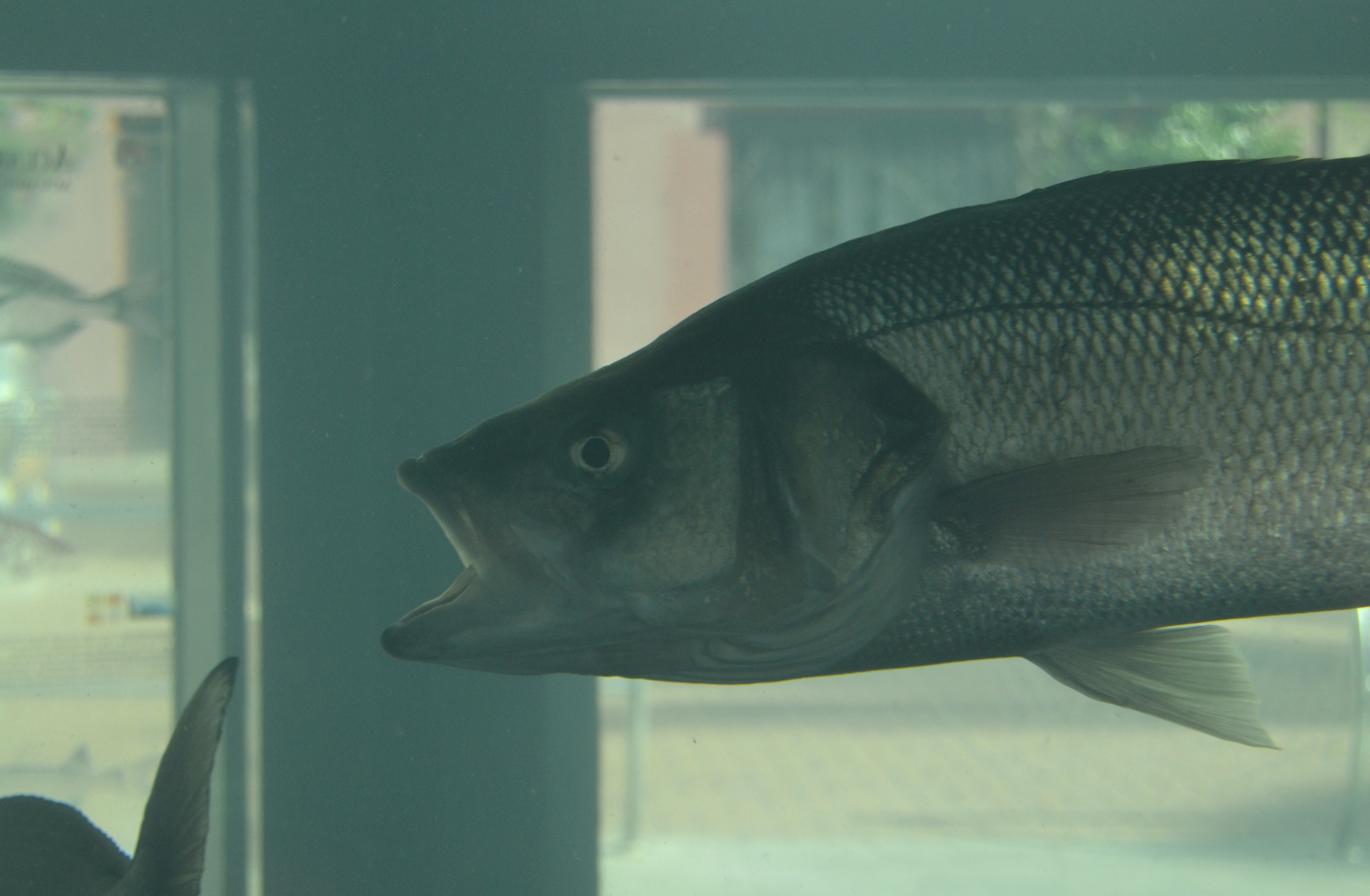
Mouth open

The European seabass hunts as much during the day as it does at night, feeding on small fish (both pelagic, such as sardines, sprats, and sand smelts, and demersal, such as sand eels), polychaetes, cephalopods (such as squid), and crustaceans. The big fish weighing more than 4 kg (9 lb) are mostly night hunters. They spawn from February to June, mostly in inshore waters. As fry they are pelagic, but as they develop, they move into estuaries, where they stay for a year or two.

== Fisheries and aquaculture ==
=== Capture fisheries ===
Capture (blue) and aquaculture (green) production of European seabass (Dicentrarchus labrax) in thousand tonnes from 1950 to 2022, as reported by the FAO

Annual catches of wild European seabass are relatively modest, fluctuating between 8,500 and 11,900 tonnes from 2000 to 2009. Most reported catches originate from the Atlantic Ocean, with France typically reporting the highest catches. In the Mediterranean, Italy used to report the largest catches but has been surpassed by Egypt.

The fish has come under increasing pressure from commercial fishing and became the focus in the United Kingdom of a conservation effort by recreational anglers. Ireland has strict laws regarding bass. All commercial fishing for the species is banned, and several restrictions are in place for recreational anglers: a closed season from May 15 – June 15 inclusive every year; a minimum size of 400 mm (16 in); and a bag limit of two fish per day. In a scientific advisory (June 2013), it is stressed that fishing mortality is increasing. The total biomass has been declining since 2005. Total biomass assumed as the best stock size indicator in the last two years (2011–2012) was 32% lower than the total biomass in the three previous years (2008–2010).

=== Farming ===
European seabass was one of Europe's first fish to be farmed commercially. Historically, they were cultured in coastal lagoons and tidal reservoirs before mass-production techniques were developed in the late 1960s. It is the most important commercial fish widely cultured in the Mediterranean. Greece, Turkey, Italy, Spain, Croatia, and Egypt are the most important farming countries. Annual production was more than 120,000 tonnes in 2010. The world's biggest producer of European seabass is Turkey.

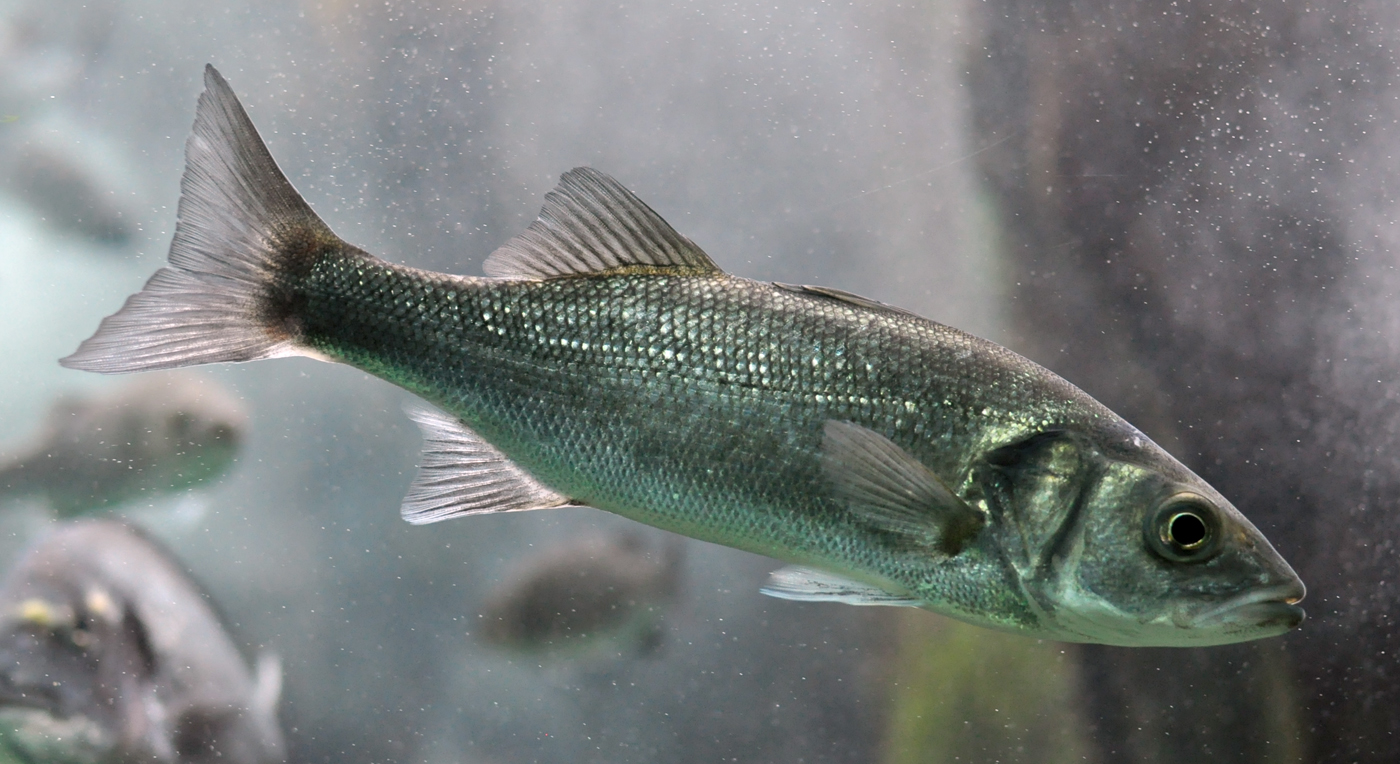
Young European seabass

Farmed European seabass have been used to study the earliest genomic and epigenetic stages of de novo domestication, including changes arising before farmed and wild populations become strongly genetically differentiated.

== Dish ==
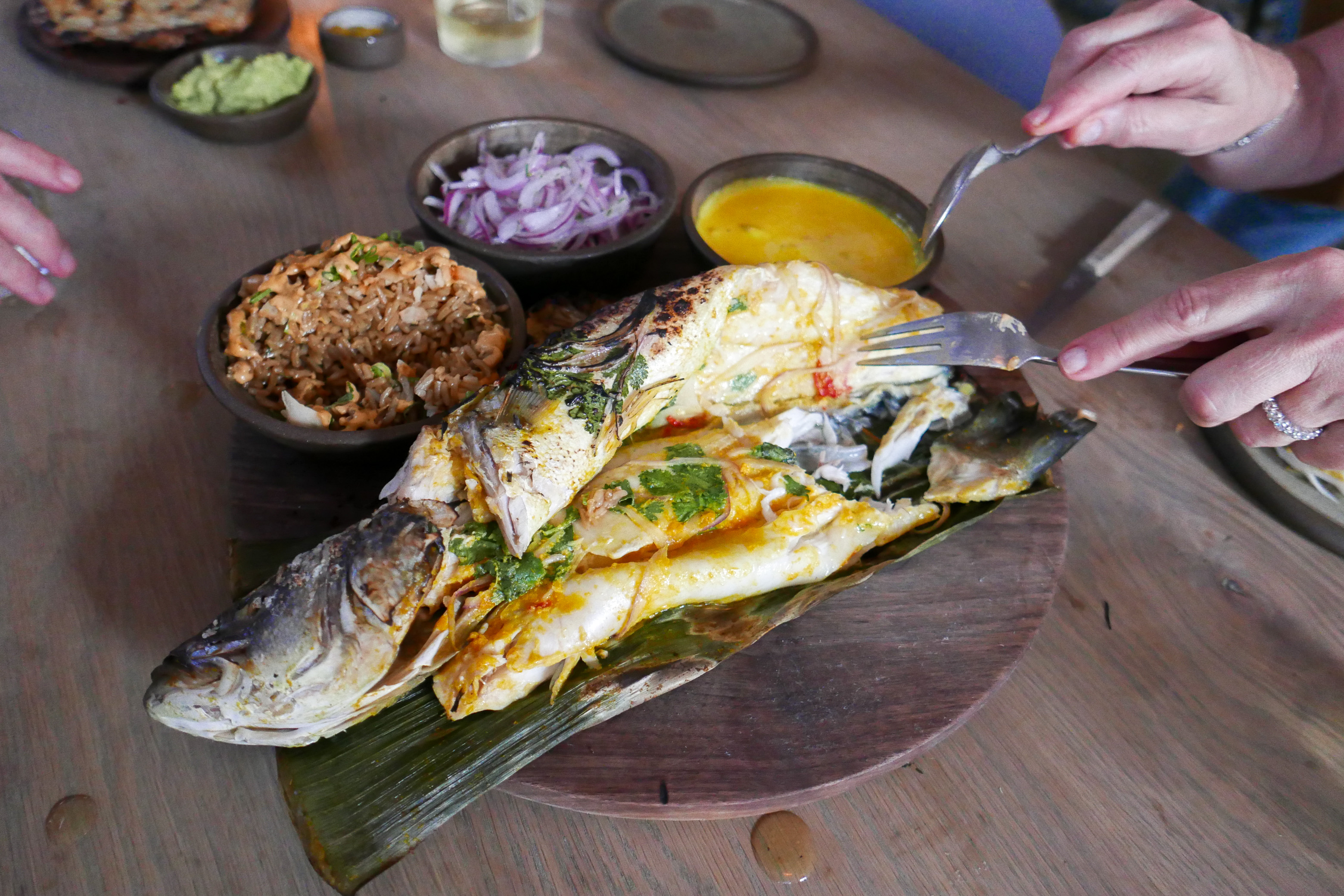
Branzino dish

Branzino, sometimes known as "spigola" in southern Italy, is popular in Italian cuisine as a main course. It is often prepared by roasting the entire fish and serving it with lemon. The meat is often desired because of its sweet taste and flaky white texture. In French it is sometimes known as "bar" or "loup de mer", and in Spanish and Portuguese, it is often referred to as "robalo". Each time the whole fish is cooked and plated.
