= Hybrid striped bass =

Scientific classification
- Kingdom: Animalia
- Phylum: Chordata
- Class: Actinopterygii
- Division: Teleostei
- Order: Acanthuriformes
- Family: Moronidae
- Genus: Morone
- Species: M. chrysops × M. saxatilis

Hybrid fish

A hybrid striped bass (Morone chrysops × M. saxatilis), also commonly referred to by the portmanteau wiper, is a freshwater hybrid fish between white bass (Morone chrysops) and striped bass (M. saxatilis). In the United States, wiper are raised in hatcheries and stocked extensively, particularly in lower midwest and southeastern reservoirs.

== Origins ==
The first reported culture of wiper was in the 1960s with gametes from a female striped bass fertilized with a male white bass. The reciprocal cross with gametes from a female white bass fertilized with a male striped bass was first produced in the 1970s. The male white bass to female striped bass cross is sometimes referred to as a “whiterock bass”, while the female white bass to male striped bass cross is referred to as a “sunshine bass”. The native ranges of striped bass and white bass have little natural overlap, but natural hybridization can occur. In the wild, a male M. saxatilis × female M. chrysops cross is more likely since the white bass eggs do not require the same degree of flotation to hatch.

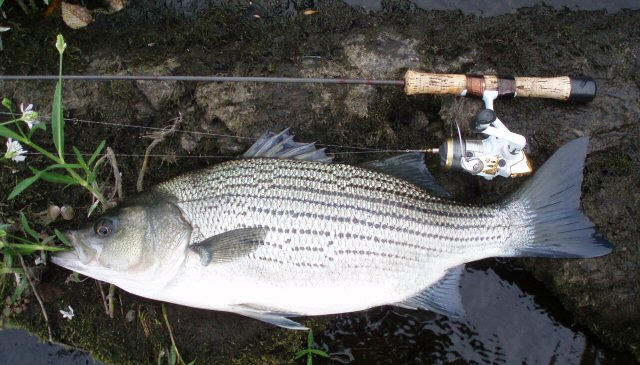
A wiper caught by a recreational angler on the Coosa River in Alabama.

== Description ==
Wiper can generally be distinguished from striped bass by broken rather than solid horizontal stripes on the body, with solid stripes more frequent above the lateral line (Note: The first stripe below the lateral line is typically continuous, however.) and fewer interruptions posteriorly. Despite being widely used as an identifying characteristic, broken stripes are not most reliable trait for identification. A more reliable external characteristic to identify this hybrid is the number of tooth patches present on the tongue. Both white bass and wiper are deep-bodied but wiper reach a larger maximum size than white bass. Other distinguishing characteristics include a serrated operculum, a forked caudal fin, ctenoid scales, and silvery coloration.

== Diet ==
Wiper are predominantly piscivorous, preferring clupeids such as gizzard shad and threadfin shad.

== Production ==
Wiper are considered better suited for culture in ponds than both parent species due to their greater tolerance of higher water temperature and lower dissolved oxygen, although they gravitate toward areas of moving water once released. The most commonly produced and stocked cross is the female striped bass and male white bass, likely due to the greater number of eggs produced per female. The female striped bass is injected with human gonadotropin which stimulates her to lay. Once the eggs are fertilized, the brood fish are removed and the eggs remain adrift in artificial current for about 48 hours to hatch.

== Management ==
Wiper are highly regarded as hard-fighting sportfish. They are known for aggressive feeding habits (such as “breaking” the surface of water to capture trapped shad) and schooling. Popular lures for catching wiper include casting spoons, buck-tail jigs, soft-body plastic fish replicas, and inline spinners. The world record wiper is a 12.38-kilogram (27 lb 5 oz) fish caught in Greers Ferry Lake, Arkansas in 1997. Additionally, wiper are considered good table fare; many restaurants sell "striped bass" on their menus, but these are farm-raised hybrid striped bass.

In some waterbodies, wiper occur naturally and may backcross with white bass or striped bass. Backcrossing could put native populations of white bass or striped bass at risk due to genetic pollution.
