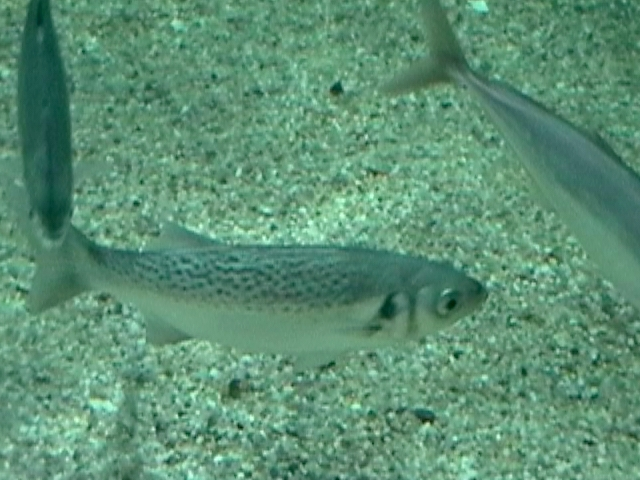

Conservation status
- Least Concern (IUCN 3.1)

Scientific classification
- Kingdom: Animalia
- Phylum: Chordata
- Class: Actinopterygii
- Order: Acanthuriformes
- Family: Moronidae
- Genus: Dicentrarchus
- Species: D. punctatus

Binomial name
- Dicentrarchus punctatus (Bloch, 1792)

Synonyms
- Sciaena punctata Bloch, 1792; Bodianus punctatus (Bloch, 1792); Labrax lupus punctatus (Bloch, 1792); Labrax punctatus (Bloch, 1792); Morone punctatus (Bloch, 1792); Perca punctata (Bloch, 1792); Perca punctulata Lacépède, 1802; Labrax orientalis Günther, 1863; Dicentrarchus orientalis (Günther, 1863); Labrax schoenleinii W. K. H. Peters, 1865

= Spotted seabass =

Species of ray-finned fish

The spotted seabass (Dicentrarchus punctatus) is a species of ray-finned fish belonging to the family Moronidae, the temperate basses. This species is found in the marine and brackish waters of the coastal eastern Atlantic Ocean from the English Channel to the Canary Islands and Senegal, as well as through the Mediterranean Sea.

== Taxonomy ==
The spotted seabass was first formally described as Sciaena punctata in 1792 by the German physician and naturalist Marcus Elieser Bloch with its type locality given as the Mediterranean Sea. This is one of two species in the genus Dicentrarchus, the other being the European seabass (D. labrax), and this genus and the genus Morone make up the family Moronidae, the temperate basses.

== Habitat ==
The spotted seabass generally lives in brackish water at depths below approximately 30 m (98 ft). It generally lives in subtropical waters, ranging from the coast of Brittany in the north to the coast of Africa and the Canary Islands in the south and also encompassing almost all of the coastline of the eastern Mediterranean Sea and going as far west as the Azores.

== Description ==
The spotted seabass can grow up to a size of about 70 cm (28 in); however, it usually only reaches a size of about 30 cm (12 in). It is a silver-grey fish covered in black spots and also has a blue back whilst alive. These black spots are only found on the adults; as well, the opercle has a rather large black spot.

== Biology ==
The spotted seabass is almost exclusively carnivorous. Its diet is largely composed of shrimp and molluscs; additionally, it at times eats smaller fish than itself. The spotted seabass breeds at various times based on geography; in the Mediterranean it generally spawns from January until March whereas in the English Channel and other northern areas this range is from March until May.

== Utilisation ==
The spotted seabass is regarded as a highly palatable fish and is commercially harvested using bottom trawls, beach seines, trammel nets and by hook-and-line. It is also a popular as a game fish for angling in the Eastern Central Atlantic. This fish is used for aquaculture frequently being cultured in ponds. The flesh is sold either fresh or frozen.
