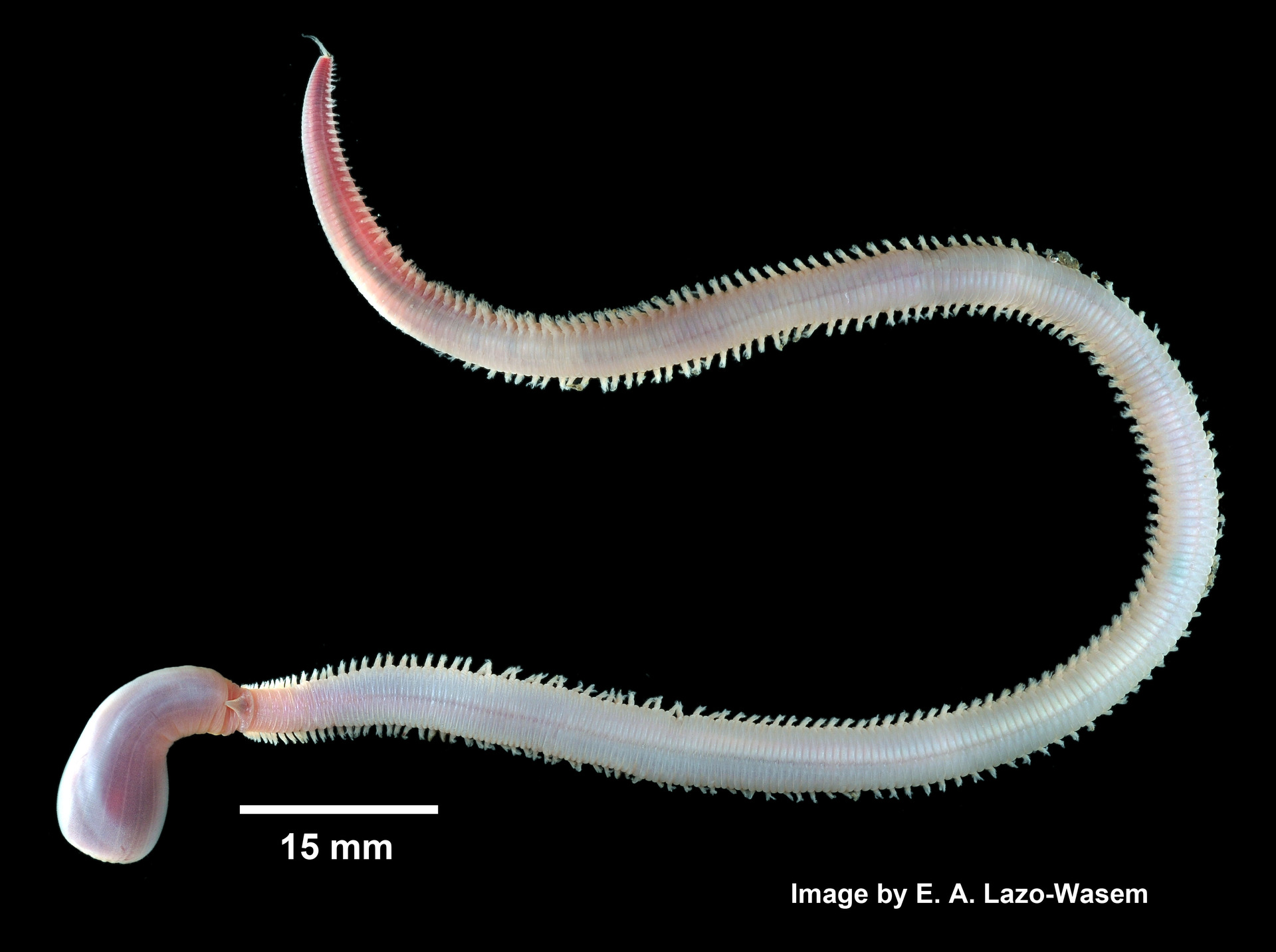
- Specimen of Glycera dibranchiata

Scientific classification
- Kingdom: Animalia
- Phylum: Annelida
- Clade: Pleistoannelida
- Subclass: Errantia
- Order: Phyllodocida
- Family: Glyceridae
- Genus: Glycera
- Species: G. dibranchiata

Binomial name
- Glycera dibranchiata Ehlers, 1868

= Glycera dibranchiata =

Species of worm

Glycera dibranchiata, one of several species commonly called a bloodworm, are segmented, red marine worms that grow up to 14-inches in length and have unique copper teeth composed of protein, melanin and 10% copper. This copper concentration is the highest among any animal.

These creatures live in tidal flats and hunt their prey by burrowing themselves several meters deep into the sand before attempting to ambush anything they are capable of swallowing.

The jaws of the bloodworms develop using the unique properties of the structural protein, multi-tasking protein (MTP). The bloodworm MTP is composed primarily of glycine and histidine, yet is able to chelate copper, phase-separate, polymerize L-3,4-dihydroxyphenylalanine (Dopa) to melanin, template the synthesis of the macroscopic 2D melanin-protein film, and mediate the jaw mechanical properties despite its simple primary sequence. As a result of these properties and a multi-step process, MTP mediates the collection and stabilization of itself, melanin, and copper to form the structure of the bloodworm jaw.

Glycera dibranchiata is considered a marine polychaete, and features a prosboscis equipped with four jaws.
