= Glycera sheikhmujibi =

Scientific classification
- Domain: Eukaryota
- Kingdom: Animalia
- Phylum: Annelida
- Clade: Pleistoannelida
- Subclass: Errantia
- Order: Phyllodocida
- Family: Glyceridae
- Genus: Glycera
- Species: G. sheikhmujibi

Binomial name
- Glycera sheikhmujibi Hossain & Hutchings, 2020

Species of annelid worm

Glycera sheikhmujibi is a species of polychaete worm. This small worm is tubular and light pink in color.

== Discovery ==
It was described by Md. Belal Hossain, an associate professor and researcher of the department of Fisheries and Marine Science, Noakhali University of Science and Technology. Dr. Pat Hatchings, a scientist of the Australian Museum Research Institute, was his research partner. It is named after Sheikh Mujibur Rahman, the first president of Bangladesh and one of the most influential political figures of the Indian subcontinent.

== Description ==
Glycera sheikhmujibi is 42 mm in length. It has a total of 158 segments and is 2.2 mm width in the middle of the body. One of its identifying features is the elongated bell-shaped suction mouth. The mouth is covered with papillae and its shape is cylindrical, but flexible. This animal has no eyes. On its periphery, the sucker has four jaws that look like black hooks. Two pairs of suckers with three papillae are attached to the laren, which are strong and triangular in shape. In addition, its middle of the body has finger-shaped lobes which are equal.

== Distribution ==
Glycera sheikhmujibi is known to inhabit the bottoms of muddy reservoir in estuary of Meghna River, near Hatiya Island.
