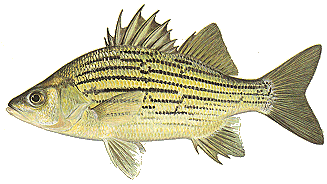

Conservation status
- Least Concern (IUCN 3.1)

- Secure (NatureServe)

Scientific classification
- Kingdom: Animalia
- Phylum: Chordata
- Class: Actinopterygii
- Order: Acanthuriformes
- Family: Moronidae
- Genus: Morone
- Species: M. mississippiensis

Binomial name
- Morone mississippiensis D. S. Jordan & C. H. Eigenmann, 1887

Synonyms
- Morone interrupta T. N. Gill, 1860 (ambiguous)

= Yellow bass =

Species of fish

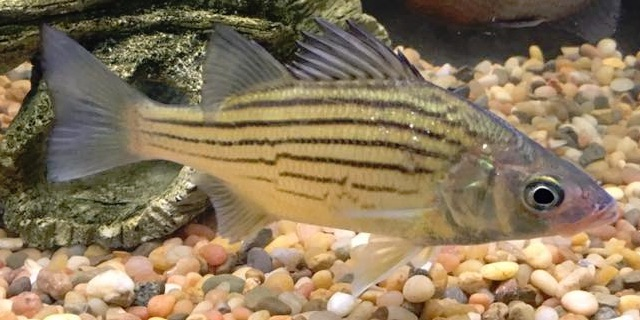
Yellow bass photographed in Rend Lake, Illinois

The yellow bass (Morone mississippiensis) is a freshwater ray-finned fish of the family Moronidae (temperate bass) native to the Mississippi River catchment of North America.

== Description ==
The yellow bass is a deep bodied fish that possesses five to seven dark stripes laterally along the sides, the lowest few of these are often broken or disrupted anterior to the origin of the anal fin. It is somewhat similar to two other sister species in the genus Morone, the white bass and the striped bass, and is distinguishable from both of these species by having the offset lateral stripes above the anal fin, and from not possessing tooth patches on the tongue. The yellow bass differs further from the white bass by having nine to ten anal rays in comparison to eleven or thirteen. The back of the fish is usually a dark olive green, and the abdomen and sides are often a silvery yellow.

== Distribution ==
The yellow bass may be found in somewhat clear waters of the Mississippi River from Minnesota to Louisiana and may also be found in the Trinity River and the Tennessee River. It can also be found in lakes surrounding these rivers, especially in areas with dense vegetation and low turbidity, and may migrate into brackish estuaries.

== Ecology ==
=== Diet ===
Food exploited by juvenile yellow bass include small aquatic invertebrates such as copepods and aquatic insects. The juvenile yellow bass feed almost exclusively on aquatic invertebrates, and once they reach adulthood they feed primarily on other small fishes; the rest of their diet consists of small crustaceans.

=== Reproduction and life cycle ===
The reproductive biology of the yellow bass is similar to that of the white bass, where spawning occurs during the spring with fish swimming into the tributaries to make spawning runs. Spawning usually occurs in moderately shallow waters during which the female lies on her side and exposes the eggs as the male fertilizes from above. The larvae of the yellow bass school together to avoid predation and they grow fairly quickly in size. Yellow bass have average lifespan of about six years.

== Relationship to humans ==
Because of its smaller size, the yellow bass is not as popular a game fish as either the white bass or the striped bass. It is usually caught by anglers fishing with crappie jigs or minnows, and may also be caught in large numbers because of the abundant populations. It is edible and is commonly taken as a food fish in its range.

The International Game Fish Association (IGFA) world record yellow bass, caught in the Morse Reservoir in Indiana in 2023, weighed 1.96 kg (4 lb 5 oz), beating a 2000 record from the same lake of 1.34 kg (2.95 lb). The IGFA record for a hybrid yellow bass (crossed with a white bass) stands at 1.81 kg (4 lb 0 oz), caught from Lake Fork Reservoir, Texas in 2023.

== Etymology ==
The specific name, mississippiensis, comes from the Mississippi River.
