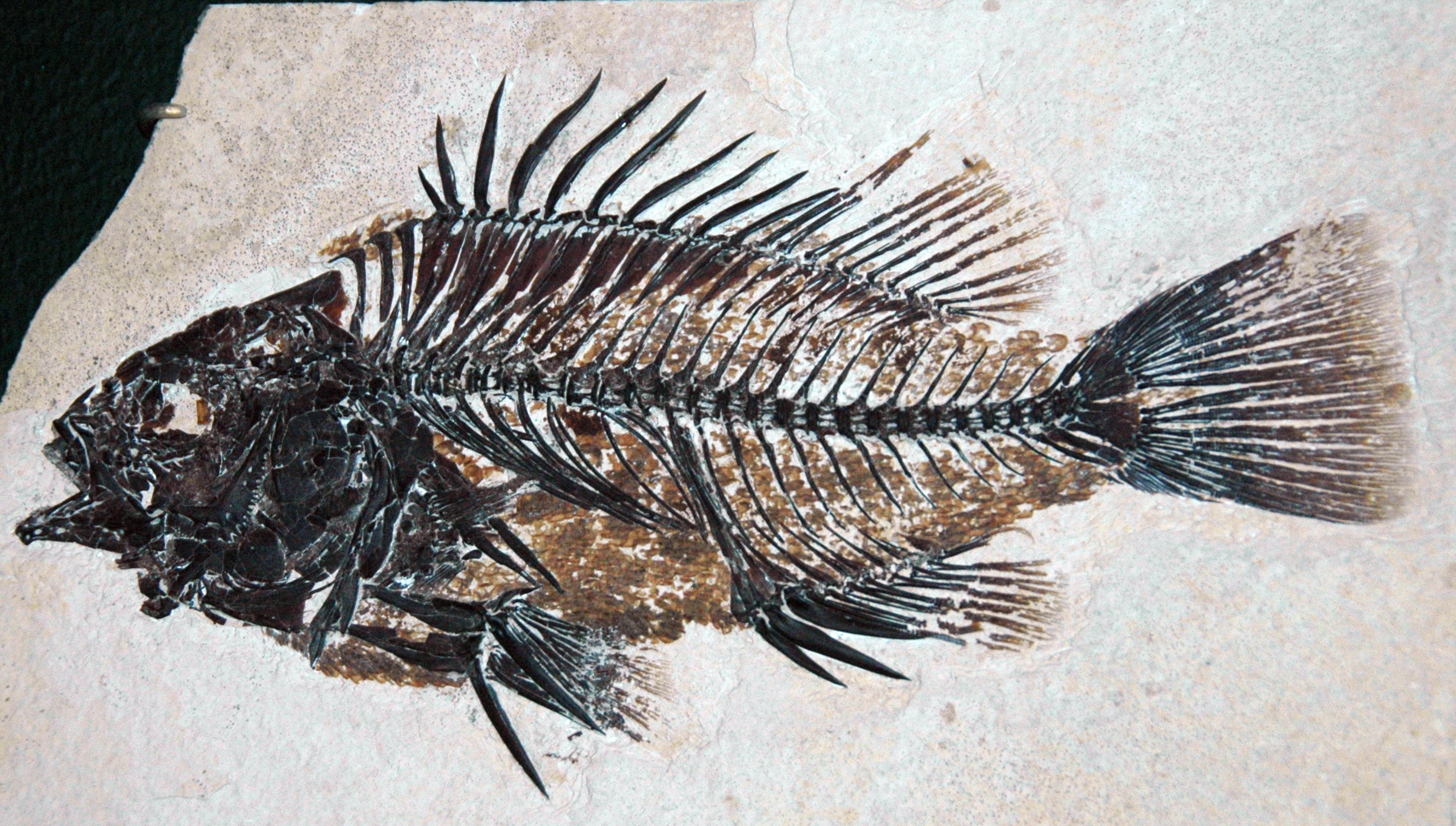
- Priscacara serrata

Scientific classification
- Kingdom: Animalia
- Phylum: Chordata
- Class: Actinopterygii
- Order: Acanthuriformes
- Family: Moronidae
- Genus: †Priscacara; Cope, 1877

Species
- P. aquilonia Wilson, 1977; P. campi Hesse, 1936; P. serrata Cope, 1877

= Priscacara =

Priscacara Temporal range: Eocene

Extinct genus of fishes

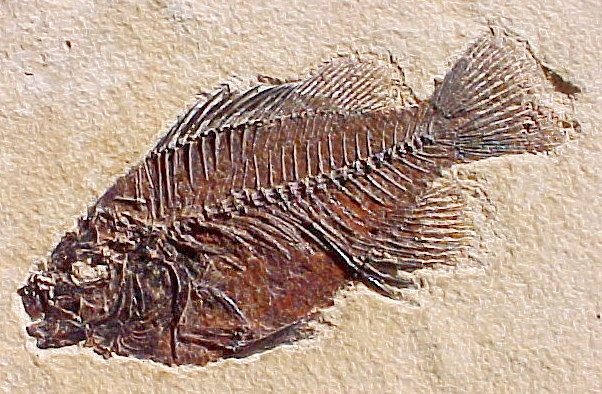
Cockerellites liops

Priscacara is a genus of extinct temperate bass described from Early to Middle Eocene fossils. It is characterized by a sunfish-like body and its stout dorsal and anal spines. The genus is best known from the Green River Formation of Wyoming, Utah and Colorado. Mass deaths of Priscacara suggest it formed schools.

== History and classification ==
The type species of Priscacara is P. serrata, described from the holotype specimen, AMNH 2442. Two species are described from northwestern North America. Hesse (1936) described Priscacara campi from a single complete fossil found in the Middle Eocene Roslyn Formation of central Washington. A third species, Priscacara aquilonia was described by Wilson (1977) from the Early Eocene "Horsefly shale" of British Columbia.

A phylogenetic review of Priscacara by Whitock (2010) recognized only two species, P. serrata and P. liops.

Cockerellites liops, holotype USNM 4044 had been placed in Priscacara as P. liops but is now considered a separate genus. C. liops is the most common species of Priscacara within the Green River lacustrine deposits and at certain locations it outnumbers P. serrata by over 3:1. The two species differ in the number of dorsal and anal fin rays, as well as possibly a coarser serrated rear edge of the preopercle in P. serrata. C. liops also has small conical teeth on the pharyngeal jaw, whereas P. serrata has large grinding toothplates, suggesting a diet of snails and crustaceans.

== Distribution ==
Priscacara fossils are commonly preserved in the Fossil Lake deposits of Eocene age in westernmost Wyoming, but are rare in the coeval Lake Gossiute sediments of Wyoming and the Lake Uinta deposits of Utah and Colorado. The genus also occurs in the middle Eocene lake deposits of Washington and British Columbia.
