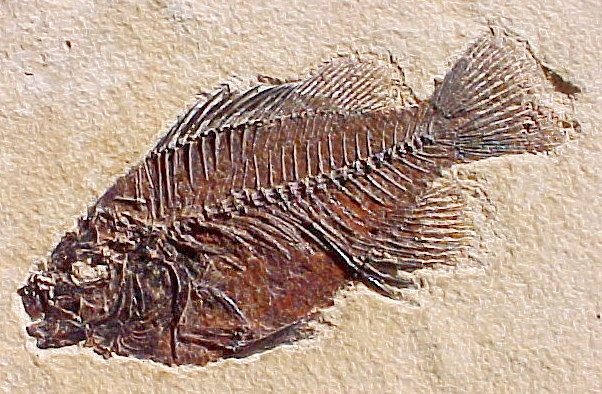
- Specimen of C. liops from the 18 inch layer of the Green River Formation, Wyoming

Scientific classification
- Kingdom: Animalia
- Phylum: Chordata
- Class: Actinopterygii
- Order: Acanthuriformes
- Family: Moronidae
- Genus: †Cockerellites; Jordan & Hanibal, 1923
- Species: †C. liops

Binomial name
- †Cockerellites liops (Cope, 1877)

Synonyms
- Priscacara liops Cope, 1877

= Cockerellites =

Cockerellites Temporal range: Early Eocene, ~53.5–48.5 Ma

Extinct genus of ray-finned fishes

Cockerellites is a genus of extinct temperate bass described from early Eocene-aged fossils found in the Green River Formation of Wyoming. It is characterized by a sunfish-like body and its stout dorsal and anal spines. The type species, C. liops, was originally named as a species of Priscacara by Edward Drinker Cope upon creating the genus in 1877, but P. liops was moved to the newly created genus Cockerellites by D. Jordan and H. Hanibal in 1923. Some authors, such as Whitlock (2010), still consider Cockerellites liops as a species of Priscacara.

C. liops is based on the holotype USNM 4044, and it was placed in Priscacara as P. liops but is now considered a separate genus. C. liops was originally seen as the most common species of Priscacara within the Green River lacustrine deposits, and at specific locations, it outnumbers P. serrata by over 3:1. The two species differ in the number of dorsal and anal fin rays, as well as possibly a coarser serrated rear edge of the preopercle in P. serrata. C. liops also has small conical teeth on the pharyngeal jaw, whereas P. serrata has large grinding tooth plates, suggesting a diet of snails and crustaceans.
