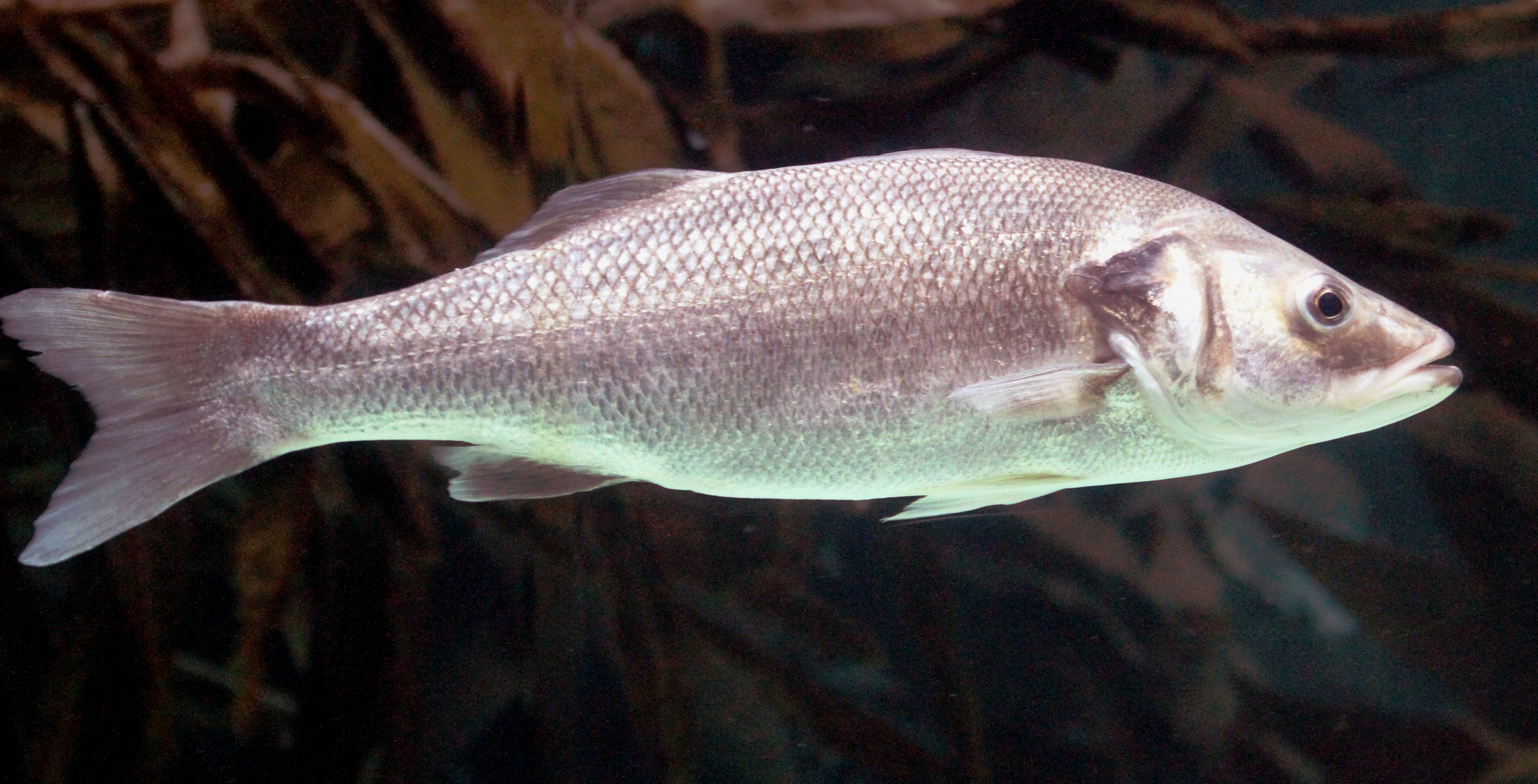
- European Seabass (D. labrax)

Scientific classification
- Kingdom: Animalia
- Phylum: Chordata
- Class: Actinopterygii
- Order: Acanthuriformes
- Family: Moronidae
- Genus: Dicentrarchus; T. N. Gill, 1860

Type species
- Perca elongata É. Geoffroy St. Hilaire, 1817

Synonyms
- Labrax G. Cuvier, 1828 (pre-occupied)

= Dicentrarchus =

Dicentrarchus Temporal range: Oligocene–present

Genus of fishes

Dicentrarchus is a genus of ray-finned fishes belonging to the family Moronidae, the temperate basses. The two species in this genus are found in the eastern Atlantic Ocean and the Mediterranean Sea. The species in this genus are economically important food fishes.

== Classification ==
Dicentrarchus was first proposed as a monospecific genus in 1860 by the American ichthyologist Theodore Gill with Perca elongata, which had been described in 1817 by Étienne Geoffroy Saint-Hilaire from the Mediterranean Sea of Egypt, designated as its type species. The genus is one of two in the family Moronidae which belongs to the order Acanthuriformes.

== Etymology ==
Dicentrarchus is a combination of di, “two”, with kentron, “thorn” or “spine”, and archos, “anus”. This is an allusion to the two anal fin spines Gill thought the European seabass had. In fact, both species have three spines in their anal fins and Gill admitted he did not actually examine a specimen.

== Species ==
Dicentrarchus currently has two species classified within it:

Image	Scientific name	Common name	Distribution
	Dicentrarchus labrax (Linnaeus, 1758)	European seabass	eastern Atlantic Ocean (from Norway to Senegal), the Mediterranean Sea, and the Black Sea
	Dicentrarchus punctatus (Bloch, 1792)	spotted seabass	coastal eastern Atlantic Ocean from the English Channel to the Canary Islands and Senegal, as well as through the Mediterranean Sea

Two fossil species are also known:

- †Dicentrarchus latus (Gorjanovic-Kramberger, 1891) - Middle Miocene of Austria
- †Dicentrarchus oligocenicus Grădianu, Bordeianu & Codrea, 2022 - Oligocene of Romania

The species †Morone ionkoi Bannikov, 1993 from the Middle Miocene of Moldova is likely more closely related to Dicentrarchus than Morone, although it has not yet been reclassified into this genus.

== Characteristics ==
Dicentrarchus seabasses have a finely serrated rear margin to the preoperculum with the lower edge having robust, forward pointing denticles. There are two flat sines on the operculum. They have two separated dorsal fins and their caudal fin is moderately forked. The largest of these fishes is the European seabass which has a maximum published total length of 103 cm (41 in).

== Distribution, habitat and biology ==
Dicentrarchus seabasses are coastal fishes found in the eastern Atlantic, from Norway south to Senegal, and the Mediterranean. These fishes are euryhaline and eurythermal. They are sociable when young. Their eggs and larvae are pelagic. These fishes are predatory, preying on crustaceans and other fishes.

== Utilisation ==
Dicentrarchus seabasses have a very palatable flesh and are economically important.
