= Beaumontoperca =

Beaumontoperca Temporal range: Late Oligocene

Scientific classification
- Domain: Eukaryota
- Kingdom: Animalia
- Phylum: Chordata
- Class: Actinopterygii
- Order: Acanthuriformes
- Family: Moronidae
- Genus: †Beaumontoperca; Gaudant, 2000
- Species: †B. beaumonti

Binomial name
- †Beaumontoperca beaumonti (Agassiz, 1836)

Synonyms
- Perca beaumonti Agassiz, 1836

Extinct genus of fishes

Beaumontoperca is an extinct genus of freshwater or estuarine temperate bass known from Late Oligocene. It contains a single species, B. beaumonti, from the Niveau du gypse d'Aix Formation of Aix-en-Provence, France.

Initially described by Louis Agassiz as Perca beaumonti, it was moved into its own genus, Beaumontoperca, in 2000 following further studies. It is considered to likely be a member of the Moronidae due to the morphology of its saccular otolith.

== See also ==
- Prehistoric fish
- List of prehistoric bony fish
