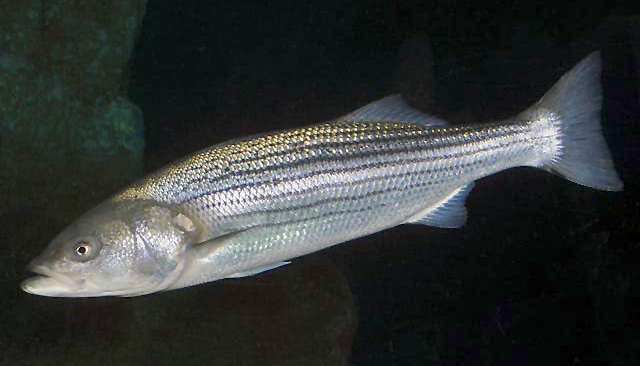

Conservation status
- Least Concern (IUCN 3.1)

Scientific classification
- Kingdom: Animalia
- Phylum: Chordata
- Class: Actinopterygii
- Division: Teleostei
- Order: Acanthuriformes
- Family: Moronidae
- Genus: Morone
- Species: M. saxatilis

Binomial name
- Morone saxatilis (Walbaum, 1792)
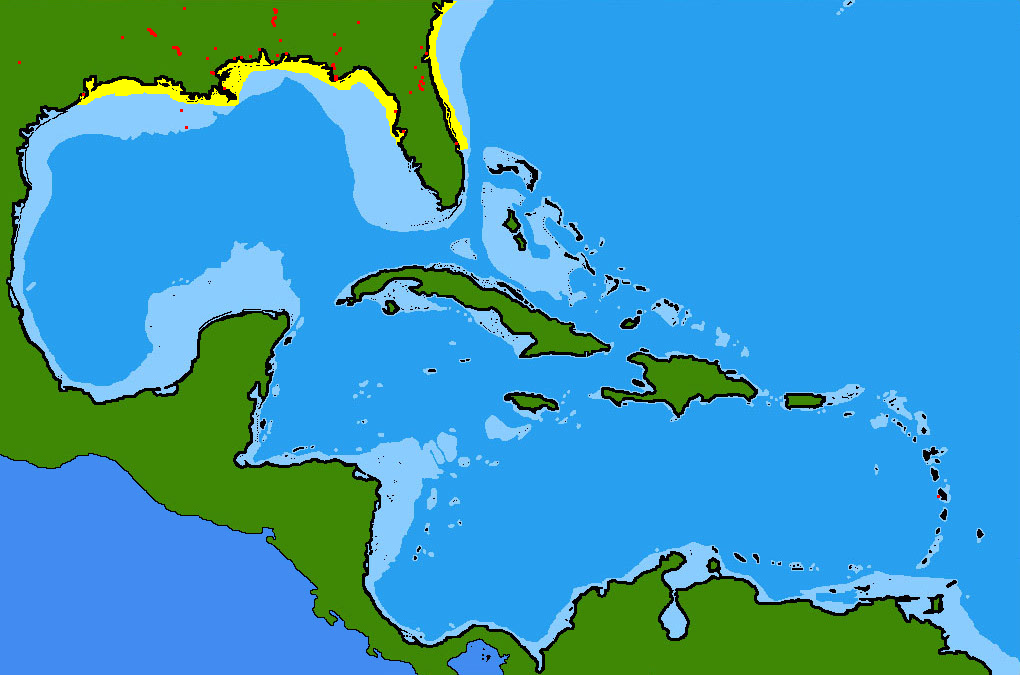
- Southern coastal range in yellow (also further north along the Atlantic coast and inland in North America)

Synonyms
- Perca saxatilis Walbaum, 1792; Roccus saxatilis (Walbaum, 1792); Sciaena lineata Bloch, 1792; Morone lineatus (Bloch, 1792); Roccus lineatus (Bloch, 1792); Perca mitchilli alternata Mitchill, 1815

= Striped bass =

Species of fish

The striped bass (Morone saxatilis), also called the Atlantic striped bass, striper, linesider, rock, or rockfish, is an anadromous perciform fish of the family Moronidae found primarily along the Atlantic coast of North America. It has also been widely introduced into inland recreational fisheries across the United States. Striped bass found in the Gulf of Mexico are a separate strain referred to as Gulf Coast striped bass.

The striped bass is the state fish of Maryland, Rhode Island, and South Carolina, and the state saltwater (marine) fish of New York, New Jersey, Virginia, and New Hampshire. It is generally called the striped bass north of New Jersey, rockfish south of New Jersey, and both in New Jersey.

The history of the striped bass fishery in North America dates back to the Colonial period. Many written accounts by some of the first European settlers describe the immense abundance of striped bass, along with alewives, traveling and spawning up most rivers in the coastal Northeast.

== Morphology and lifespan ==
The striped bass is a typical member of the family Moronidae in shape, having a streamlined, silvery body marked with longitudinal dark stripes running from behind the gills to the base of the tail. Common mature size is 20 to 40 pounds (9–18 kg). The largest specimen recorded was 124 pounds (56 kg), netted in 1896. Striped bass are believed to live for up to 30 years. The average size in length is 20 to 35 inches (50–90 cm) and approximately 5 to 20 pounds (2–9 kg), but varies based on the fish's age and sex.

== Distribution ==
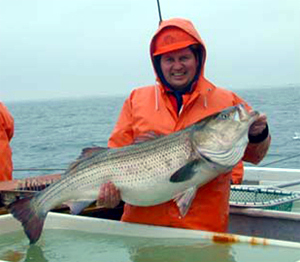
A researcher holding up a large striped bass

=== Natural distribution ===
Striped bass are native to the Atlantic coastline of North America from the St. Lawrence River into the Gulf of Mexico to Louisiana. They are anadromous fish that migrate between fresh and salt water. Spawning takes place in fresh water.

=== Introductions outside their natural range ===
Striped bass have been introduced to the Pacific Coast of North America and into many large reservoir impoundments across the United States by state game and fish commissions for recreational fishing and as a predator to control populations of gizzard shad. These include: Elephant Butte Lake in New Mexico; Lake Ouachita, Lake Norman in North Carolina; Lake Norfork, Beaver Lake and Lake Hamilton in Arkansas; Lake Thunderbird in Illinois; Lake Pleasant, and Lake Havasu in Arizona; Lake Powell along the Arizona/Utah border; Castaic Lake, Pyramid Lake, Silverwood Lake, Diamond Valley Lake, and San Francisco Bay-Delta in California; Lewis Smith Lake in Alabama; Lake Cumberland in Kentucky; Lake George in Florida; Lake Murray in South Carolina; Lake Lanier in Georgia; Watts Bar Lake, in Tennessee; Lake Mead, Nevada; Lake Texoma on the border of Texas and Oklahoma, Lake Tawakoni, Lake Whitney, Buffalo Springs Lake, Possum Kingdom Lake, and Lake Buchanan in Texas; Raystown Lake in Pennsylvania; Lake Wallenpaupack in Northeastern Pennsylvania; Umpqua River in Oregon and in Virginia's Smith Mountain Lake, Leesville Reservoir, and Lake Anna.

Striped bass have also been introduced into waters in Ecuador, Iran, Latvia, Mexico, Russia, South Africa, and Turkey, primarily for sport fishing and aquaculture.

== Environmental factors ==
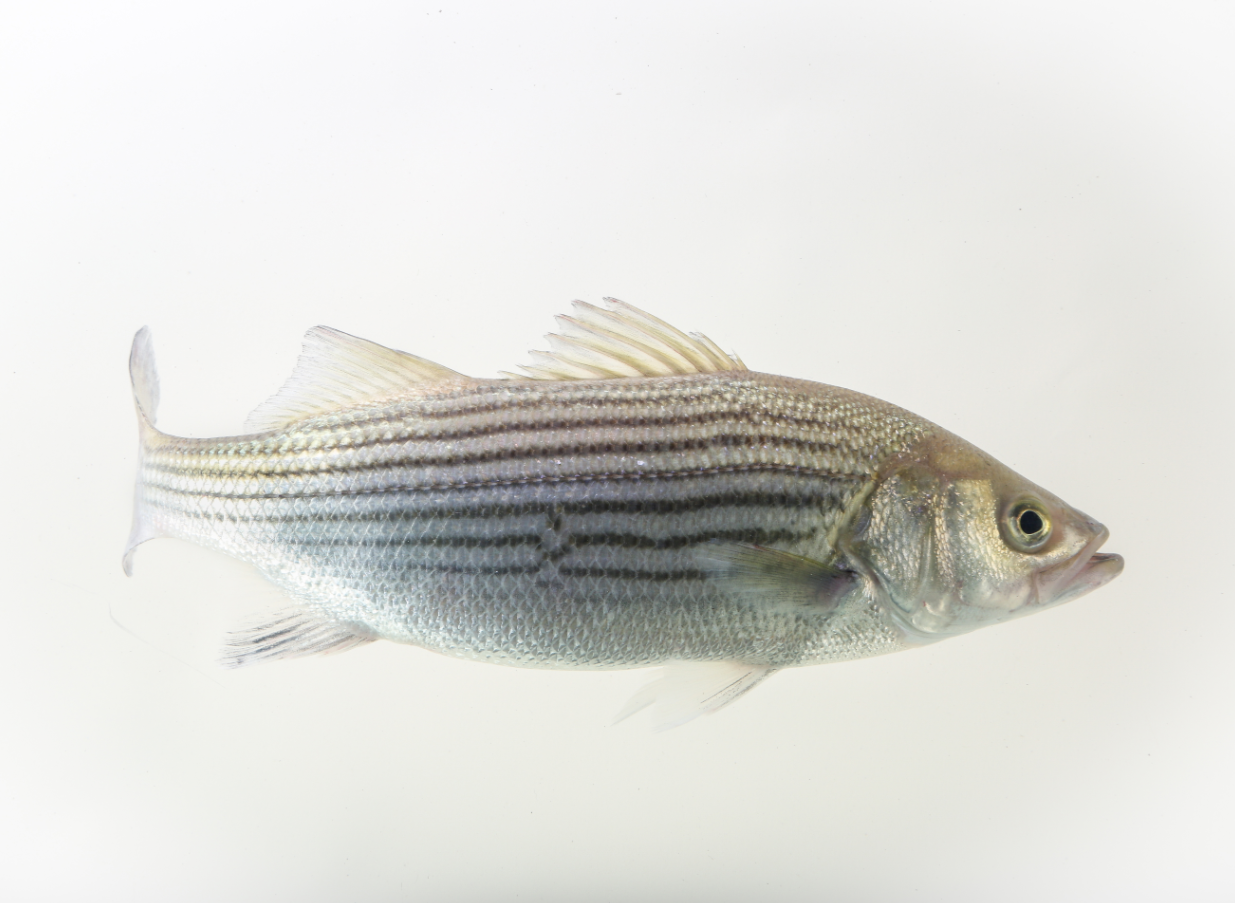
Striped bass (Morone saxatilis)

The spawning success of striped bass has been studied in the San Francisco Bay-Delta water system, with a finding that high total dissolved solids (TDS) reduce spawning. At levels as low as 200 mg/L TDS, an observable diminution of spawning productivity occurs. They can be found in lakes, ponds, streams, and wetlands.

Though the population of striped bass was growing and repopulating in the late 1980s and throughout the 1990s, a study executed by the Wildlife and Fisheries Program at West Virginia University found that the rapid growth of the striped bass population was exerting a tremendous pressure on its prey (river herring, shad, and blueback herring). This pressure on their food source was putting their own population at risk due to the population of prey naturally not coming back to the same spawning areas.

In the United States, the striped bass was designated as a protected game fish in 2007, and executive agencies were directed to use existing legal authorities to prohibit the sale of striped bass caught in federal waters in the Atlantic Ocean and Gulf of Mexico. In addition, Connecticut, Maine, New Jersey, New Hampshire, Pennsylvania, and South Carolina have designated striped bass as a game fish in state waters.

In Canada, the province of Quebec designated the striped bass population of the Saint Lawrence as extirpated in 1996. Analysis of available data implicated overfishing and dredging in the disappearance. In 2002, a reintroduction program was successful.

== Life cycle ==
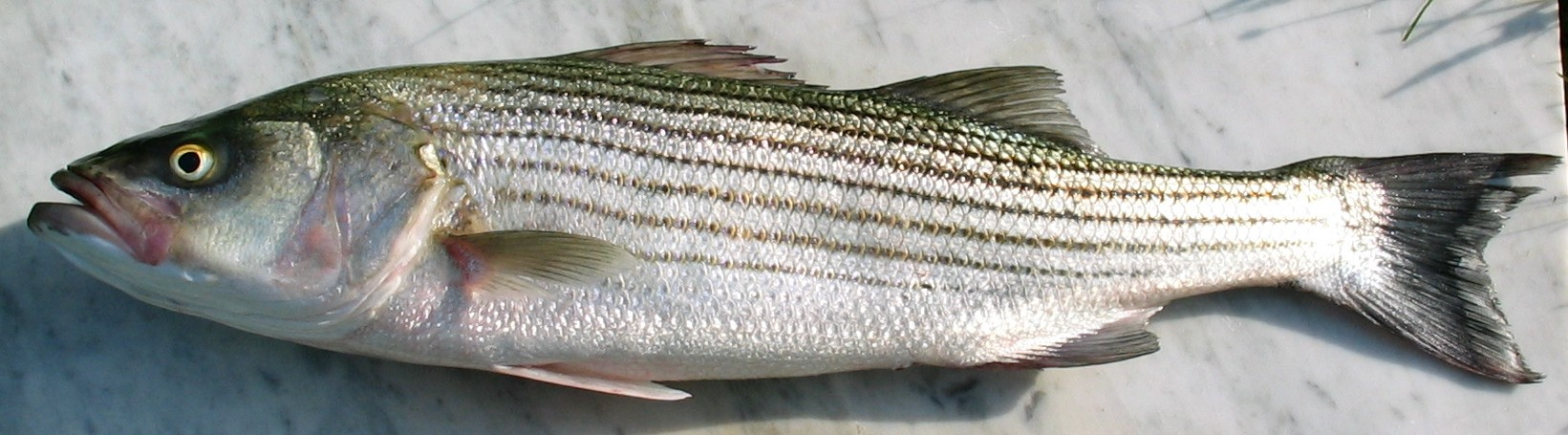
A striped bass caught off the New Jersey coast

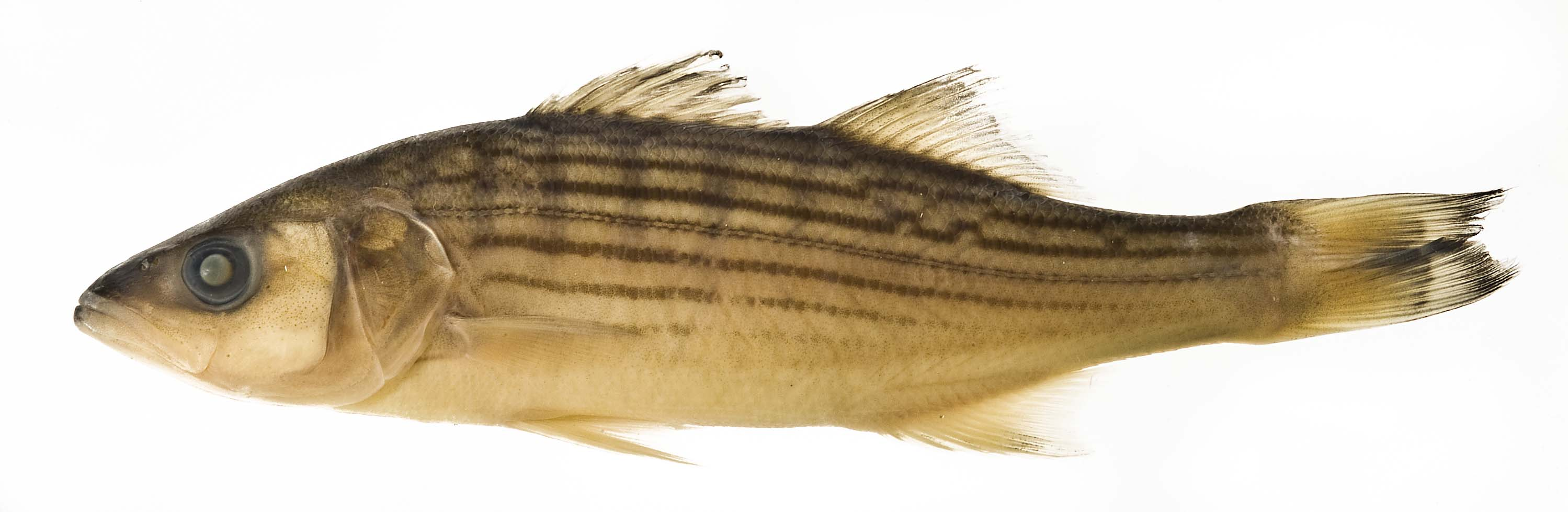
Preserved specimen

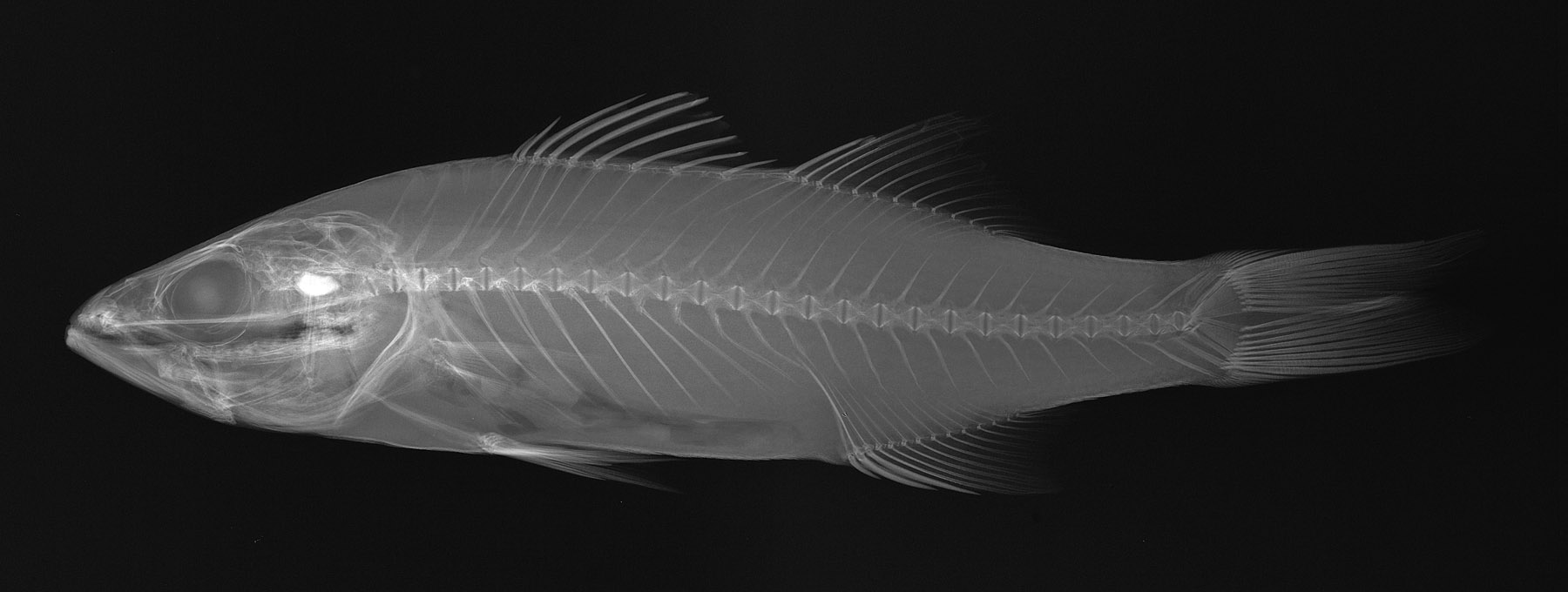
X-ray image

Striped bass spawn in fresh water, and although they have been successfully adapted to freshwater habitat, they naturally spend their adult lives in saltwater (i.e., they are anadromous). Five important bodies of water with breeding stocks of striped bass are: Miramichi River, Chesapeake Bay, Massachusetts Bay/Cape Cod, Hudson River, and Delaware River. Many of the rivers and tributaries that emptied into the Atlantic, had at one time, bred stock of striped bass. This occurred until the 1860s. One of the largest breeding areas is the Chesapeake Bay, where populations from Chesapeake and Delaware bays have intermingled. The very few successful spawning populations of freshwater striped bass include Lake Texoma, Lake Weiss (Coosa River), the Colorado River and its reservoirs downstream from and including Lake Powell, and the Arkansas River, as well as Lake Marion (South Carolina) that retained a landlocked breeding population when the dam was built; other freshwater fisheries must be restocked with hatchery-produced fish annually. Stocking of striped bass was discontinued at Lake Mead in 1973 once natural reproduction was verified.

== Hybrids with other bass ==
Striped bass have also been hybridized with white bass to produce hybrid striped bass also known as wiper, whiterock bass, sunshine bass, palmetto bass, and Cherokee bass. These hybrids have been stocked in many freshwater areas across the US.

== Fishing for striped bass ==
Striped bass are of significant value for sport fishing, and have been introduced to many waterways outside their natural range. A variety of angling methods are used, including trolling and surf casting. Lures such as wooden plugs, plastic swimmers, poppers, and metal spoons all work very well for fishing off of the surf. Using live and dead bait can also be an effective technique when targeting Striped bass from land. Striped bass take a number of live and fresh baits, including bunker, clams, eels, sandworms, herring, bloodworms, mackerel, shad, bluegill, and crayfish.

The largest striped bass ever taken by angling was an 37.14 kg (81 lb 14 oz) specimen taken from a boat in Long Island Sound, near the Outer Southwest Reef, off the coast of Westbrook, Connecticut. The all-tackle world record fish was taken by Gregory Myerson on the night of August 4, 2011. The fish took a drifted live eel bait, and fought for 20 minutes before being boated by Myerson. A second hook and leader was discovered in the fish's mouth when it was boated, indicating it had been previously hooked by another angler. The fish measured 54 in long and had a girth of 36 in. The International Game Fish Association (IGFA) declared Myerson's catch the new all-tackle world record striped bass on October 19, 2011. In addition to now holding the all-tackle record, Meyerson's catch also landed him the new IGFA men's 37 kg (80 -lb) line class record for striped bass, which previously stood at 70 lb. The previous all-tackle world record fish was a 35.6 kg (78 lb) specimen taken in Atlantic City, New Jersey, on September 21, 1982, by Albert McReynolds, who fought the fish from the beach for an hour and 20 minutes after it took his Rebel artificial lure. On March 20, 2023, then 12-year-old Henry Bulgin set the first Junior IGFA All-Tackle Length world record by landing a 98 cm (39 in) striped bass while fishing the Chesapeake Bay just south of Annapolis, Maryland, but this was beaten by the end of that year by a 114 cm (45 in) specimen in the same bay, just off Virginia. Recreational bag limits vary by state and province. On July 4, 2008, David Hochman shot a 68.4 lb specimen off the coast of Rhode Island to set the world record for Striped Bass taken by speargun.

== Landlocked striped bass ==
Striped bass are anadromous, so their upriver spawning migrations led some individuals to become "landlocked" during lake dam constructions. The first area where this was documented was at the Santee-Cooper River during the construction of the two dams that impounded Lakes Moultrie and Marion, and because of this, the state game fish of South Carolina is the striped bass.

Striped bass can stay in rivers for long periods of time, not returning to sea unless temperature changes forced migration. Once fishermen and biologists caught on to rising striped bass populations, many state natural resources departments started stocking striped bass in local lakes. Striped bass will exhibit migrations upstream from freshwater lakes during the spawning period. Landlocked striped bass have historically been observed to have a hard time reproducing naturally, and one of the few and most successful rivers in which they have been documented reproducing successfully is the Coosa River in Alabama and Georgia.

A 31.55 kg (69 lb 9 oz) landlocked bass was caught in February 2013 by James R. Bramlett on the Warrior River in Alabama, a current world record. This fish had a length of 44 inches (110 cm) and a girth of 37.75 inches (95.9 cm).

A self-sustaining population of striped bass also exists in Lake Texoma, a brackish lake. In Canada there are no landlocked striped bass, but a large number of bass overwinter in Grand Lake, Nova Scotia. They migrate out in early April into the Shubenacadie River to spawn. These bass also spawn in the Stewiacke River (a tributary of the Shubenacadie). The Shubenacadie River system is one of five known spawning areas in Canada for striped bass, with the others being the St. Lawerence River, Miramichi River, Saint John River, Annapolis River, and Shubenacadie/Stewiacke Rivers.

== Management ==
The striped bass population declined to less than 5 million by 1982, but efforts by fishermen with throw back lengths for smaller striped bass and management programs to rebuild the stock proved successful, and in 2007, the nearly 56 million fish included all ages. Recreational anglers and commercial fisherman caught an unprecedented 3.8 million fish in 2006. In New Jersey, alone among states, there is no legal commercial fishery for Striped Bass. The management of the species includes size limits, commercial quotas, and biological reference points for the health of the species.

The Atlantic coast-wide harvest of striped bass is managed by the Atlantic States Marine Fisheries Commission (AMSFC). In October 2019, the AMSFC announced that the 2018 Benchmark Stock Assessment indicated that "the resource is overfished and experiencing overfishing." Following a series of hearings during March and April 2021 to gather public input, the ASMFC Striped Bass Technical Committee will make recommendations for a new 10-year management strategy, Amendment 7 to the Interstate Management Plan for Atlantic Striped Bass, to replenish striped bass to sustainable levels throughout its traditional migratory range from North Carolina to Maine. Amendment 7 will be finalized and adopted in late 2021 and implemented in 2022. Conditions of the Striped bass fishery have continued to get worse with Striped bass stocks nearly at the low hit all the way back in 1985. There is major controversy in the fishing community on whether this data is correct because many anglers have seen great fishing in recent years.

== Culinary use ==
Striped bass (3 oz, baked)
Nutritional value per 100 g (3.5 oz)
- Energy: 461 kJ (110 kcal)
- Carbohydrates: 0 g
- Fat: 3 g
- Saturated: 1 g
- Polyunsaturated omega−3: 0.8 g
- Protein: 19 g
Vitamins and minerals
Minerals	Quantity %DV^{†}
Sodium	3% 75 mg
- Source: Seafood Nutrition Chart, New York Sea Grant and the New York Seafood Council, 1996.
- ^{†}Percentages estimated using US recommendations for adults.

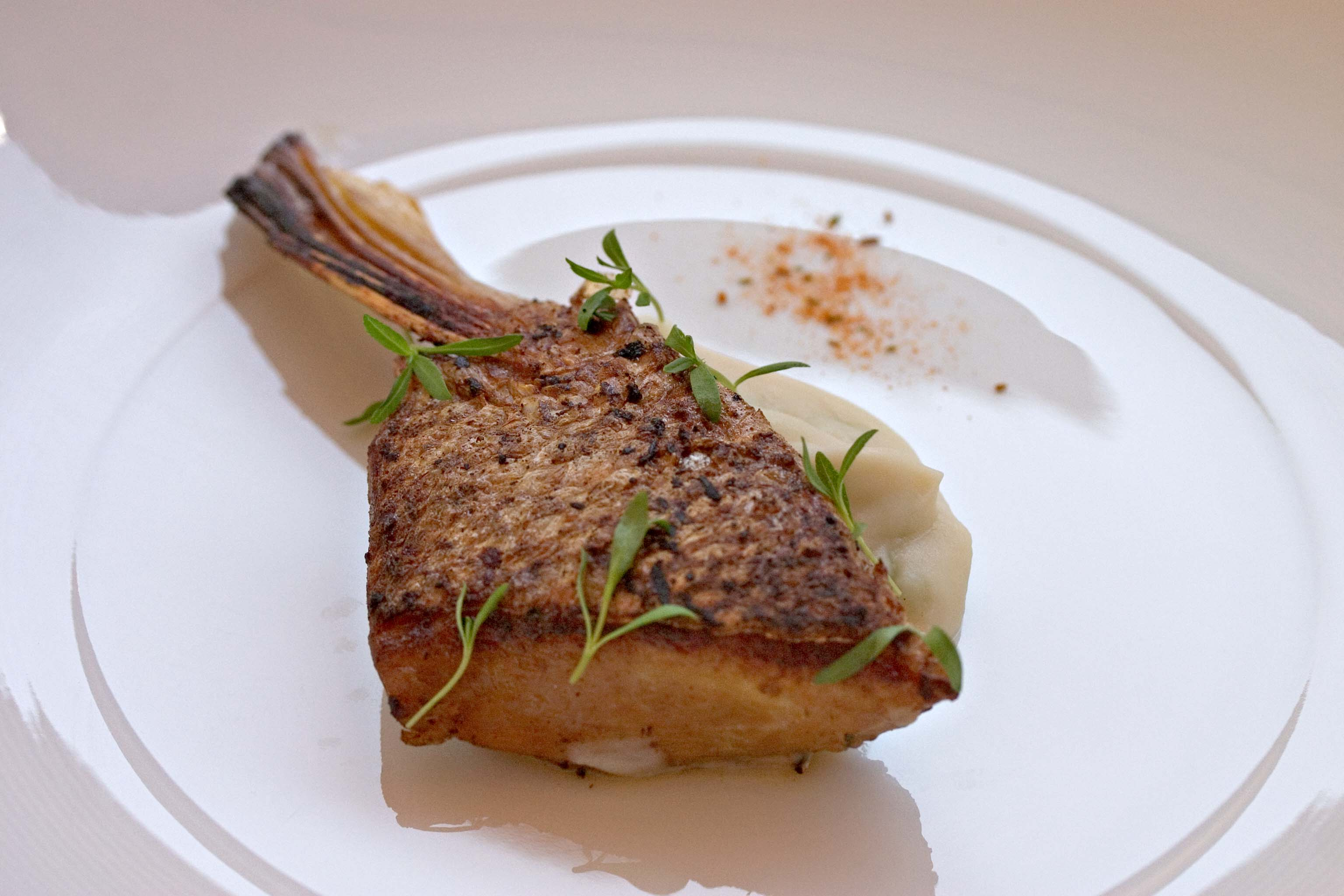
Striped bass brisket with a lima–fava bean puree

Striped bass has white meat with a mild flavor and a medium texture. It is extremely versatile in that it can be pan-seared, grilled, steamed, poached, roasted, broiled, sautéed, and deep fried (including batter-frying). The flesh can also be eaten raw or pickled.

The primary market forms for fresh bass include headed and gutted (with the head and organs removed) and filets; the primary market forms for frozen bass include headed and gutted and loins. It can also be found in steaks, chunks, or whole. Fresh striped bass is available year-round, and is typically sold in sizes from two to fifteen pounds, and can be sold up to fifty pounds.

Striped bass has firm and flavorful flesh with a large flake. The hybrid striped bass yields more meat, has a more fragile texture, and a blander flavor than wild striped bass. The fish has a mild and distinctive flavor. In recipes, it can be substituted for milder fish like cod, as well as for stronger fish like bluefish. Other fish can substitute it, including weakfish, tilefish, blackfish, small bluefish, catfish, salmon, swordfish, and shark. Striped bass is easily grilled in fillets, and is therefore popular in beach communities.

In Virginia, anadromous striped bass caught from the Chesapeake Bay and its small tidal tributaries have been found to be contaminated with polychlorinated biphenyls (PCBs), leading to the issuance of a fish consumption advisory by the Virginia Department of Health.
