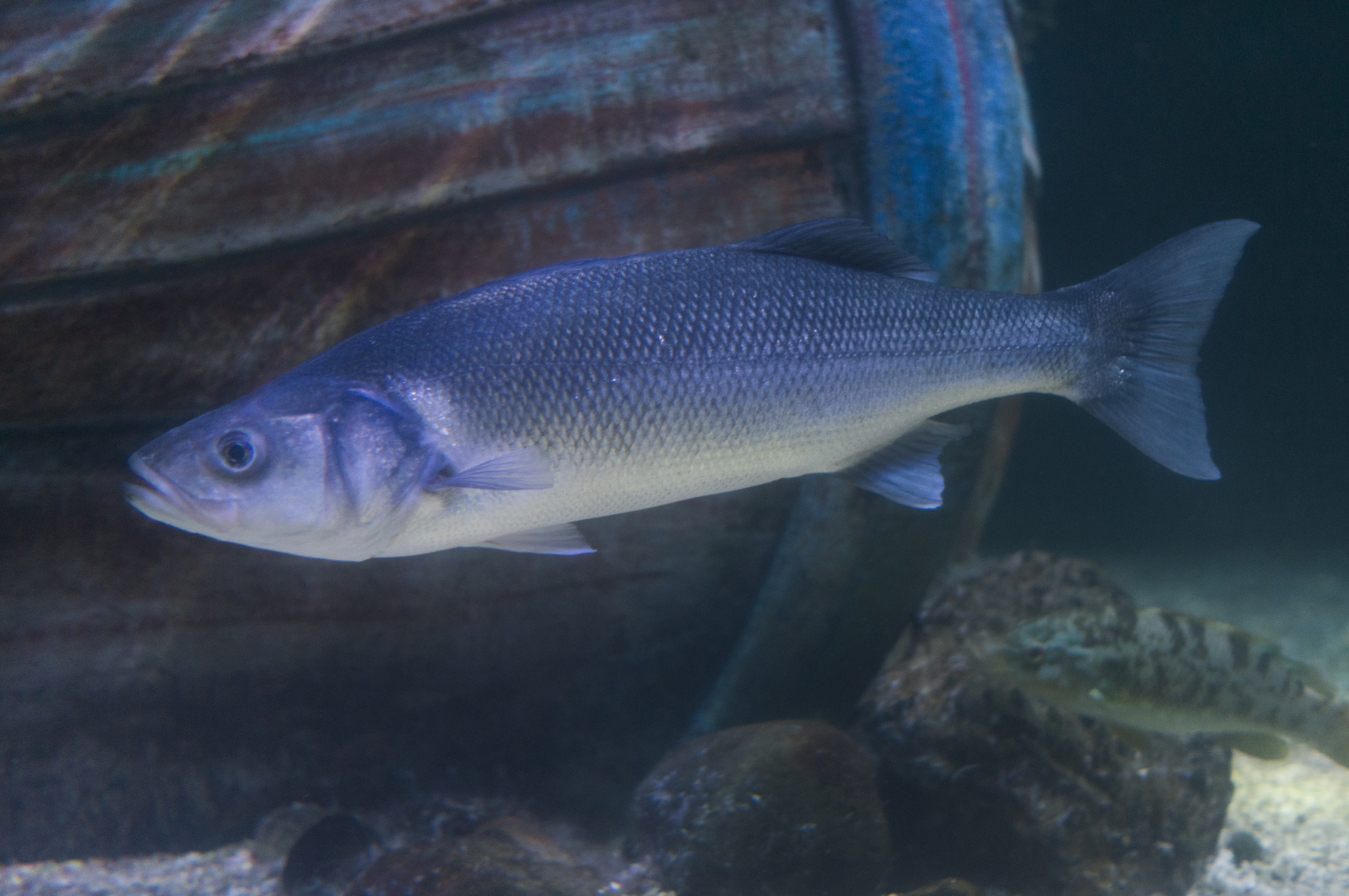
- European seabass (Dicentrarchus labrax)

Scientific classification
- Kingdom: Animalia
- Phylum: Chordata
- Class: Actinopterygii
- Order: Acanthuriformes
- Family: Moronidae; D. S. Jordan & Evermann, 1896

Genera
- See text

= Moronidae =

Moronidae Temporal range: Eocene-Holocene, 55–0 Ma

Family of ray-finned fishes

The Moronidae is a family of percomorph fishes, commonly called the temperate basses, in the order Moroniformes. These fishes are found in the freshwaters of North America and the coastal waters of the North Atlantic.

== Taxonomy ==
Moronidae was first proposed as a family in 1896 by the American ichthyologists David Starr Jordan and Barton Warren Evermann. The 5th edition of the Fishes of the World classifies this family in the order Moroniformes with the Ephippidae and Drepaneidae. Other authorities place the Ephippidae and Drepaneidae in the order Ephippiformes with the Moronidae classified as incertae sedis in the series Eupercaria. Other authorities classify all three families in the Moroniformes sensu Fishes of the World in the Acanthuriformes.

== Description ==
Moronidae basses have oblong bodies which are slightly compressed. They have large mouths with the upper jaw being broad to the rear, leading to most of the jaw being exposed when the mouth is closed. The jaws have bands of small, conical teeth with no canine-like teeth. There are also bands of simple teeth on the sides and front of the roof of the mouth. There are also 2 parallel bands of simple teeth on the base of the tongue. The operculum has 3 flat spines while the preoperculum is finely toothed. The first dorsal fin has between 8 and 10 spines and the second has a single spine and between 10 and 13 soft rays. The anal fin has 3 spines and between 9 and 12 soft rays, and has its origin far to the rear of the origin of the second dorsal fin. The caudal fin is forked and the caudal peduncle has a dense covering of scales. The head and body are covered in small, rough scales. There are between 50 and 72 pores in the continuous lateral line, which extends almost as far as the rear margin of the caudal fin, and there are additional rows of lateral-line scales on the caudal fin over and under the main line.

The largest species is the striped bass (Morone saxatilis) with a maximum published total length of 200 cm (79 in) while the smallest is the white bass (M. chrysops) with a maximum published total length of 45 cm (18 in).

== Genera ==
Moronidae basses are classified within the two living genera Morone and Dicentrarchus as follows:

Extant species
Genus	Species	Common name	Image
Dicentrarchus T. N. Gill, 1860	D. labrax (Linnaeus, 1758)	European seabass	
Dicentrarchus T. N. Gill, 1860	D. punctatus (Bloch, 1792)	spotted seabass	
Morone Mitchill, 1814	M. americana (J. F. Gmelin, 1789)	white perch	
Morone Mitchill, 1814	M. chrysops (Rafinesque, 1820)	white bass	
Morone Mitchill, 1814	M. mississippiensis D. S. Jordan & C. H. Eigenmann, 1887	yellow bass	
Morone Mitchill, 1814	M. saxatilis (Walbaum, 1792)	striped bass	

=== Fossil species ===
- †Beaumontoperca Gaudant, 2000 (Oligocene; Europe)
  - B. beaumonti (Agassiz, 1836) (Chattian; France)
- †Cockerellites Jordan & Hanibal, 1923 (Eocene; North America)
  - †C. liops Cope, 1877 (Ypresian; United States)
- †Eomorone Gaudant, 2005 (Miocene; Europe)
  - †E. kokayi (Middle Miocene; Hungary)
- †Paramorone David, 1946 (Eocene; North America)
  - †P. eocenica David, 1946 (Priabonian; United States)
- †Priscacara Cope, 1877 (Eocene; North America)
  - †P. aquilonia Wilson, 1977 (Ypresian; Canada)
  - †P. campi Hesse, 1936 (Eocene; United States)
  - †P. serrata Cope, 1877 (Ypresian; United States)

The genus Lateolabrax had formerly been classified in the Moronidae but is now placed in either Polyprionidae or Lateolabracidae.

== Distribution and habitat ==
Moronidae basses are only found in the north Atlantic Ocean. The seabasses in the genus Dicentrarchus are found in the eastern Atlantic where they inhabit coastal seas and estuaries from Norway south to northern Africa, including the Mediterranean and Black Seas. The genus Morone is found in eastern North America with one mainly marine species and three largely freshwater species. They have been introduced elsewhere.

== Biology ==
Moronidae basses move into inshore waters, estuaries and rivermouths in the summer, but in winter they move farther offshore and into deeper waters. The young fish gather in schools, but the adults appear to be more solitary. They are predatory, feeding mainly on shrimp and mollusks, as well as smaller fish.

== Utilisation ==
Moronidae basses are important target fishes for recreational sea angling, and some species support significant commercial fisheries and are used in aquaculture.
