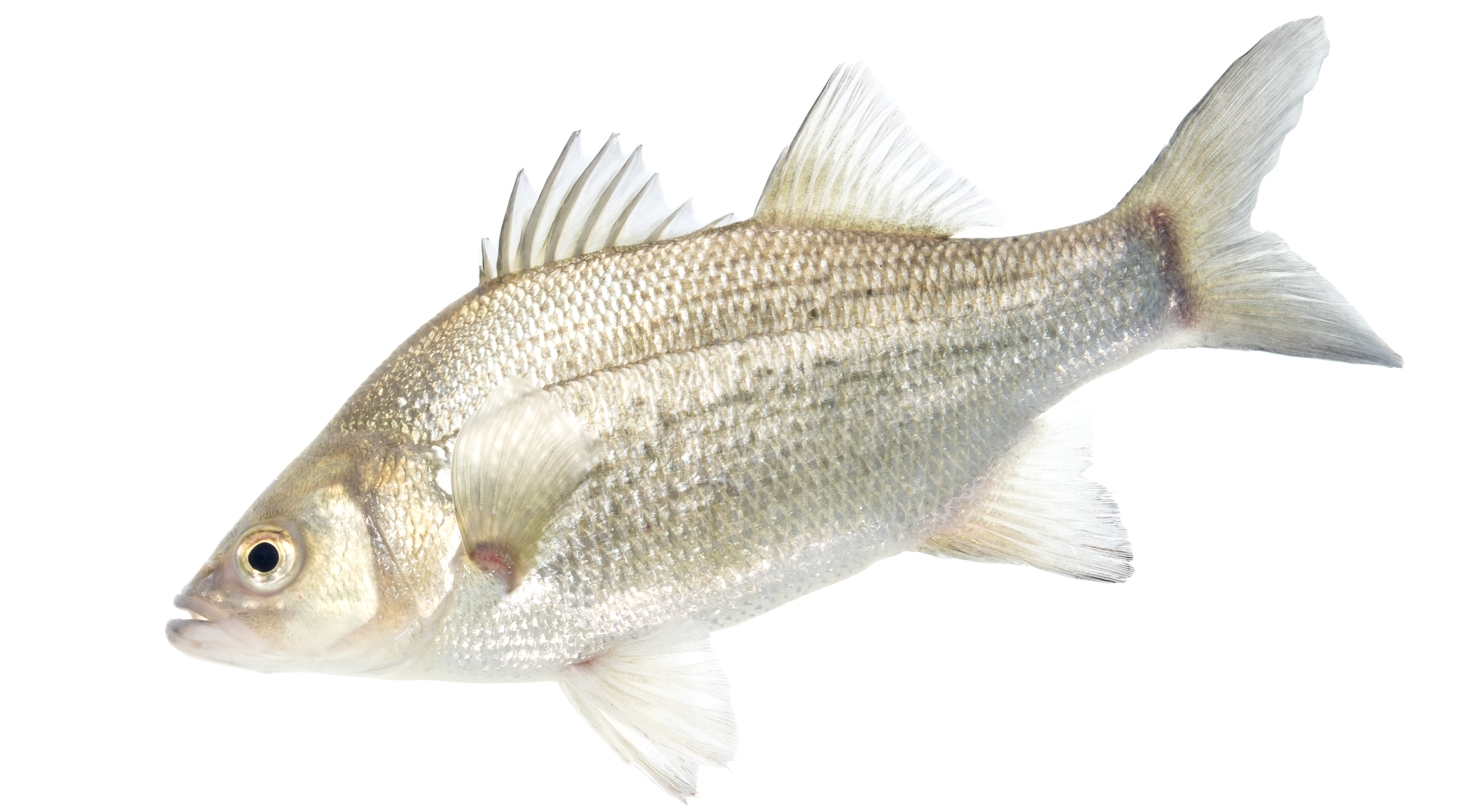

Conservation status
- Least Concern (IUCN 3.1)

- Secure (NatureServe)

Scientific classification
- Kingdom: Animalia
- Phylum: Chordata
- Class: Actinopterygii
- Order: Acanthuriformes
- Family: Moronidae
- Genus: Morone
- Species: M. chrysops

Binomial name
- Morone chrysops (Rafinesque, 1820)

Synonyms
- Perca chrysops Rafinesque, 1820; Lepibema chrysops (Rafinesque, 1820); Roccus chrysops (Rafinesque, 1820); Labrax albidus DeKay, 1842; Labrax osculatii De Filippi, 1853

= White bass =

Species of fish

The white bass, silver bass, or sand bass (Morone chrysops) is a freshwater fish of the temperate bass family Moronidae, and is commonly around 12–15 inches long. The species' main color is silver-white to pale green. Its back is dark, with white sides and belly, and with narrow dark stripes running lengthwise on its sides. It has large, rough scales and two dorsal fins. They are widely distributed across North America, inhabiting large reservoirs and rivers. When mating in the spring, they are more often found in shallow rivers, creeks, and streams. They have been introduced in some places as sport fish and also to predate on nuisance fish, such as gizzard shad. It is the state fish of Oklahoma.

== Range ==
White bass are distributed widely across the United States, especially in the Midwest. They are very abundant in Pennsylvania and the area around Lake Erie. Some native ranges of the white bass are the Arkansas River, western Lake Erie, the Detroit River, and Lake Poinsett in South Dakota; they are abundant in the Winnebago lakes system of Wisconsin; and they are also very abundant in Oklahoma. White bass have also been found in rivers that flow to the Mississippi. Native to many northern habitats, they have been introduced in many different waters around the United States, particularly in southern locations. They were also successfully introduced to Manitoba starting in the 1960s, where they have gained importance as a sport fish.

== Description ==
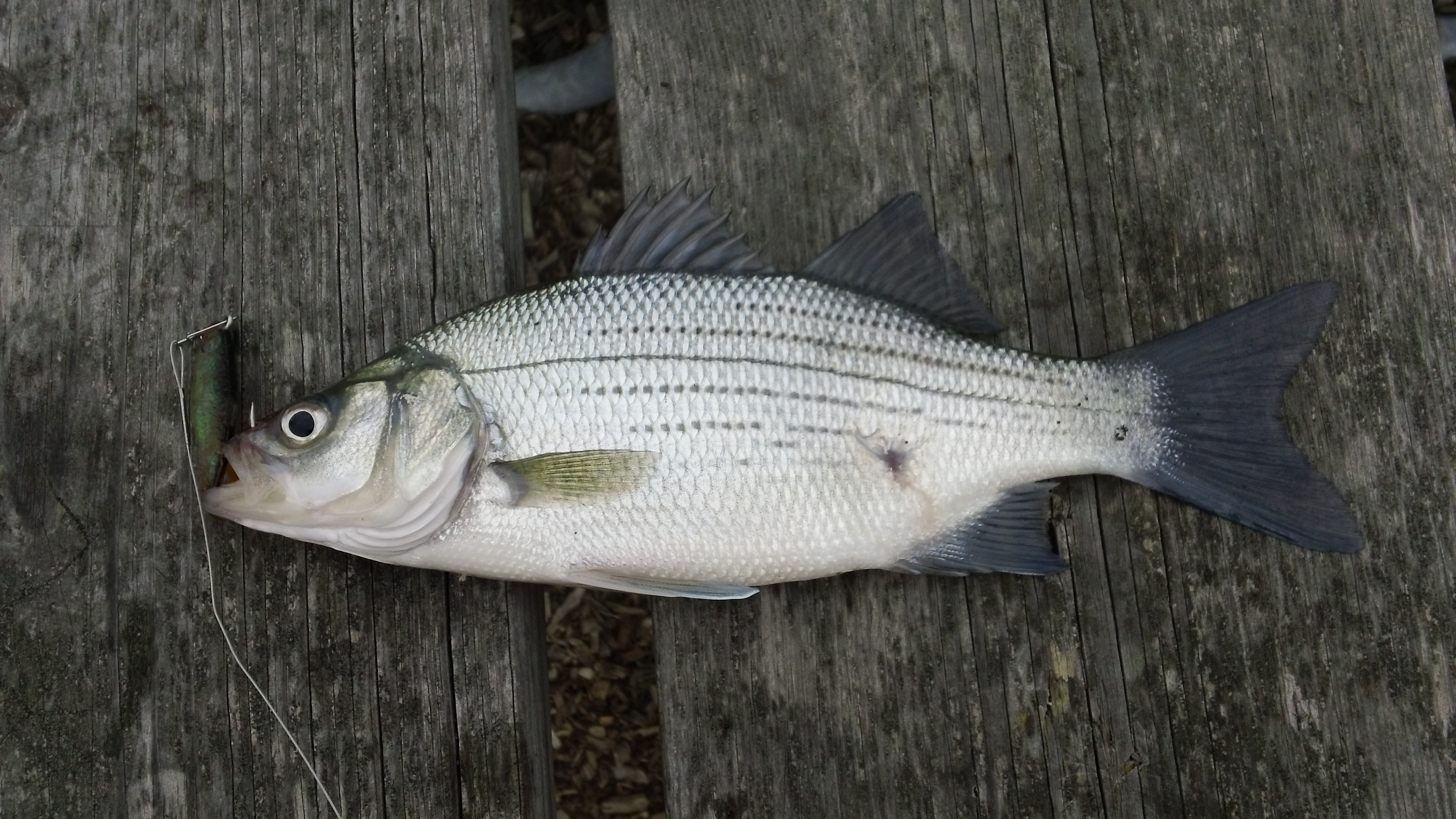
A white bass, caught in Grosse Pointe Woods, MI.

The species' main color is silver-white to pale green. Its back is dark, with white sides and belly, and with narrow dark stripes running lengthwise on its sides. It has large, rough scales and two dorsal fins. The more anterior dorsal fin is much harder and appears to have spines on it. Although these are not true spines, this type of fin is called a spinous ray. The more posterior of the two dorsal fins is much softer, and is thus called a soft-ray. White bass can be distinguished from white perch (Morone americana) by having separated anterior and posterior dorsal fins; the spinous-ray and soft-ray portions of the dorsal fin of white perch are united and both are erected together when the spinous portion is extended. Because the vertebrae do not extend into the tail, the white bass has what is called a homocercal tail. The body is deep and compressed laterally. Most grow to a length between 10 and 12 inches (25 and 30 cm), though they can reach 17 inches (43 cm) or more. Because the dorsal and ventral portions of its tail angle inward toward a point to create a clear angle, the tail is said to be notched.

The record size for white bass caught on fishing tackle, per The International Game Fish Association, is 3.09 kilograms (6 lb 13 oz) shared by fish caught in 1989 in Orange Lake, Orange, Virginia, and in 2010 in Amite River, Louisiana.

== Diet ==
White bass are carnivores. They have four main taxa in their diet: calanoid copepods, cyclopoid copepods, daphnia, and leptodora. They are visual feeders. When not frightened, they will bite readily at live bait such as worms and minnows. Only the largest fish will feed on other fish, and as the summer season progresses, there is an overall trend towards eating fewer fish. Fish that are able to accumulate lipids over the summer are better able to survive cold winters. When looking at midwestern white bass, particularly in South Dakota, diet overlap occurs between the bass and the walleye. As seasons progress through the summer and fall, the amount of diet overlap decreases as a result of both fish increasing in length.

== Habitat ==
White bass are found in high densities in the upstream segment of rivers. This portion of the river becomes the most degraded, as a number of different kinds of fish live in this segment, as well.

== Reproduction ==
The spawning season for the white bass is mid-March to late May. The optimal water temperatures are 12 to 20 °C (54 to 68 °F). They are known to find their home spawning ground even if it is moved to a different part of the same lake. They often spawn in moving water in a tributary stream, but they will spawn in windswept lake shores. They spawn during daylight. Females release 242,000 to 933,000 eggs which stick to the surface of objects. Eggs are laid in clear, relatively shallow water on plants, submerged logs, gravel, or rocks. The parents move to deeper water and do not care for the young fish. The young fish live in shallow water for a while until they move to deeper water.

When trying to find a female with whom to mate, males will bump against a female's abdominal area. The female will then rise closer to the surface and begin spinning and releasing eggs. Several males that have stayed in the area will be able to fertilize the eggs the female releases.

=== Hybrids with other bass ===
White bass have also been hybridized with striped bass (Morone saxatilis) to produce hybrid striped bass also known as wiper, whiterock bass, sunshine bass, palmetto bass, and Cherokee bass. These hybrids have been stocked in many freshwater areas across the US. White bass have one tooth patch on the back of their tongue, unlike hybrid striped bass and striped bass, which both have two patches there.
