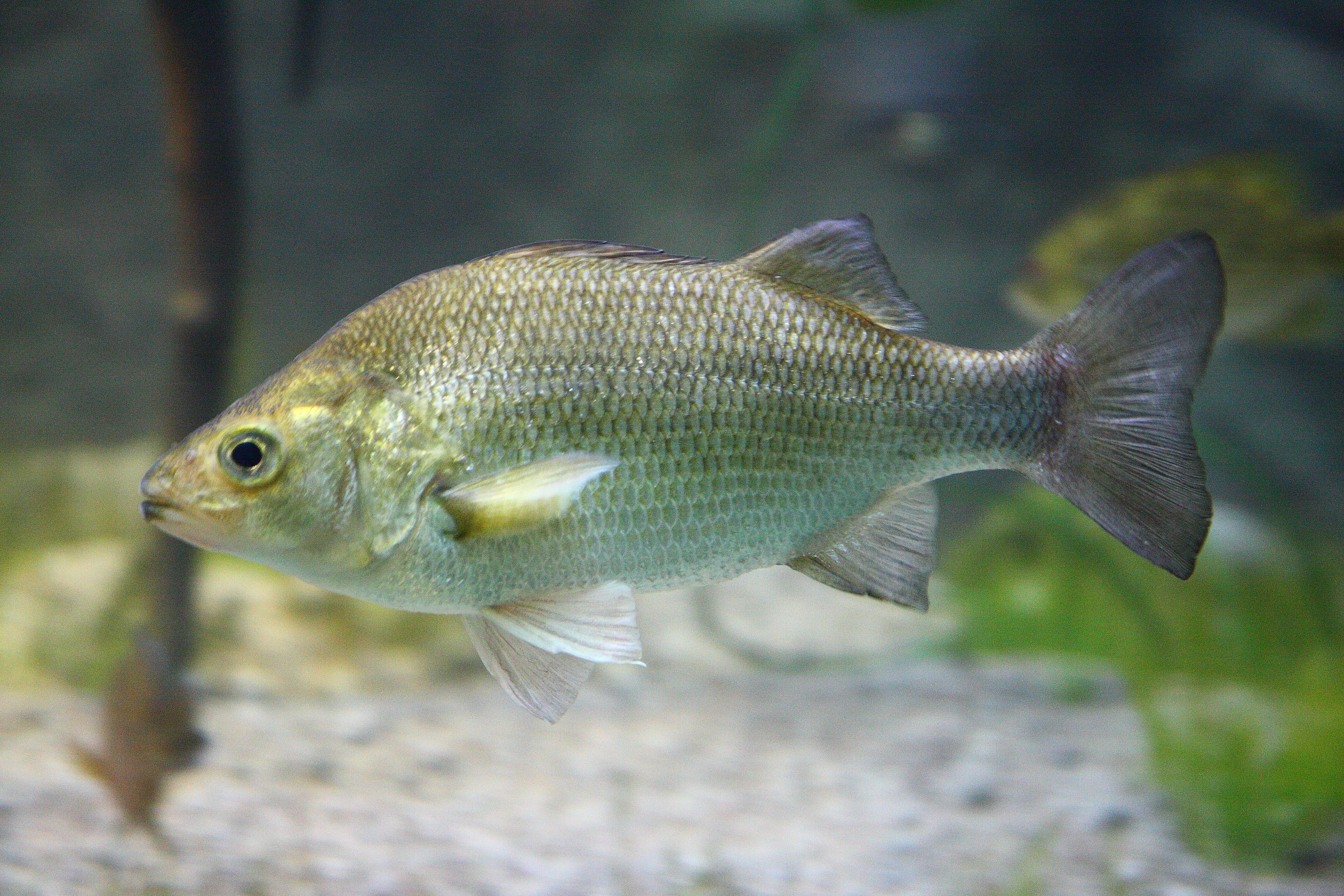

Conservation status
- Least Concern (IUCN 3.1)

Scientific classification
- Kingdom: Animalia
- Phylum: Chordata
- Class: Actinopterygii
- Order: Acanthuriformes
- Family: Moronidae
- Genus: Morone
- Species: M. americana

Binomial name
- Morone americana (J. F. Gmelin, 1789)

Synonyms
- Perca americana J. F. Gmelin, 1789; Roccus americanus (J. F. Gmelin, 1789); Perca immaculata Walbaum, 1792; Morone rufa Mitchill, 1814; Morone pallida Mitchill, 1814

= White perch =

Species of fish

The white perch (Morone americana) is not a true perch but is a fish of the temperate bass family, Moronidae, notable as a food and game fish in eastern North America. In some places it is referred to as "Silver Bass".

The common name "white perch" is sometimes applied to the white crappie (Pomoxis annularis).

== Description ==
Generally silvery-white in color, hence the name, depending upon habitat and size specimens have begun to develop a darker shade near the dorsal fin and along the top of the fish. This sometimes earns them the nickname "black-back". White perch have been reported up to 49.5 cm (19.5 in) in length and weighing 2.2 kg (4.9 lb).

== Ecology ==
Although favoring brackish waters, it is also found in fresh water and coastal areas from the St. Lawrence River and Lake Ontario south to the Pee Dee River in South Carolina, and as far east as Nova Scotia. They are also found in the lower Great Lakes, Finger Lakes, Long Island Sound and nearby coastal areas, Hudson and Mohawk River system, Delaware Bay and Chesapeake Bay. It is also found occasionally in small landlocked lakes and ponds.

== Diet ==
White perch are known to eat the eggs of many species native to the Great Lakes, such as walleye and other true perches. At times, fish eggs are 100% of their diet. They prefer to eat small minnows like mudminnows and fathead minnows.

In the Chesapeake Bay, white perch commonly prey upon grass shrimp, razor clams, and bloodworms which are all common to the region.

== Reproduction ==
White perch are a prolific species. The female can deposit over 150,000 eggs in a spawning session, lasting just over a week. Several males will often attend a spawning female, and each may fertilize a portion of her eggs. The young hatch within one to six days of fertilization.

At times, a parasite known as Lironeca ovalis is located in the gills. Its presence is believed to reduce the growth rate of white perch.

The white perch is currently recovering from a loss of population in the Hudson River.

== Aquatic nuisance species ==
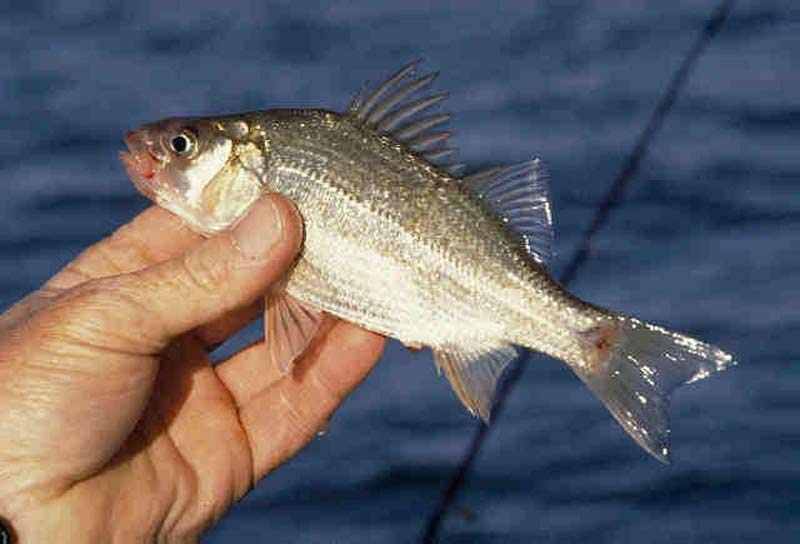
Morone americana

Some states consider the white perch to be a nuisance species due to its ability to destroy fisheries. They have been associated with the declines in both walleye and white bass populations because they feed heavily on baitfish used by those species and outcompete them for food and space. Many states have enacted laws forbidding possession of live white perch. Additionally, these states recommend not releasing captured white perch back into the water to help control its spread.
