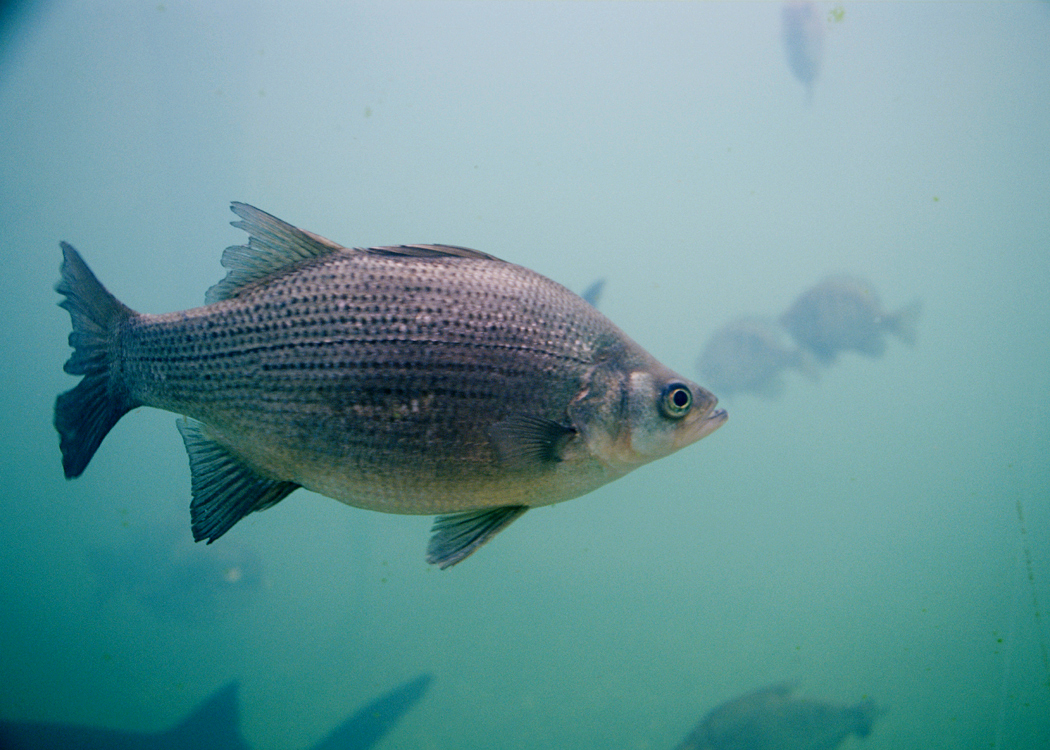
- White bass (M. chrysops)

Scientific classification
- Kingdom: Animalia
- Phylum: Chordata
- Class: Actinopterygii
- Order: Acanthuriformes
- Family: Moronidae
- Genus: Morone; Mitchill, 1814

Type species
- Morone rufa Mitchill, 1814

Synonyms
- Chrysoperca Fowler, 1907; Lepibema Rafinesque, 1820; Roccus Mitchill, 1814

= Morone =

Morone Temporal range: Eocene to present

Genus of ray-finned fishes

Morone is a genus of temperate basses native to the Atlantic coast of North America and the freshwater systems of the midwestern and eastern United States. Fossil evidence also suggests they inhabited Europe during the Paleogene and Neogene.

== Etymology ==
The word morone is an archaic variation of "maroon". American politician-naturalist Samuel Latham Mitchill (1764-1831) first coined the genus in 1814, describing all four species of "perch of New York" he included under the genus (only two of which still remain classified under the genus today) as having "ruddy", "scarlet", or "reddish, rusty and ochreous" fins. Species of Dicentrarchus were formerly placed in this genus, but can be distinguished by the presence of preopercular spines in Dicentrarchus.

== Species ==
The currently recognized species in this genus are:

Image	Scientific name	Common name	Distribution
	Morone americana (J. F. Gmelin, 1789)	white perch	fresh water and coastal areas from the St. Lawrence River and Lake Ontario south to the Pee Dee River in South Carolina, and as far east as Nova Scotia, lower Great Lakes, Finger Lakes, Long Island Sound and nearby coastal areas, Hudson and Mohawk River system, Delaware Bay and Chesapeake Bay.
	Morone chrysops (Rafinesque, 1820)	white bass	widely across the United States
	Morone mississippiensis D. S. Jordan & C. H. Eigenmann, 1887	yellow bass	Mississippi River from Minnesota to Louisiana and may also be found in the Trinity River and the Tennessee River.
	Morone saxatilis (Walbaum, 1792)	striped bass	Atlantic coastline of North America from the St. Lawrence River into the Gulf of Mexico to approximately Louisiana.

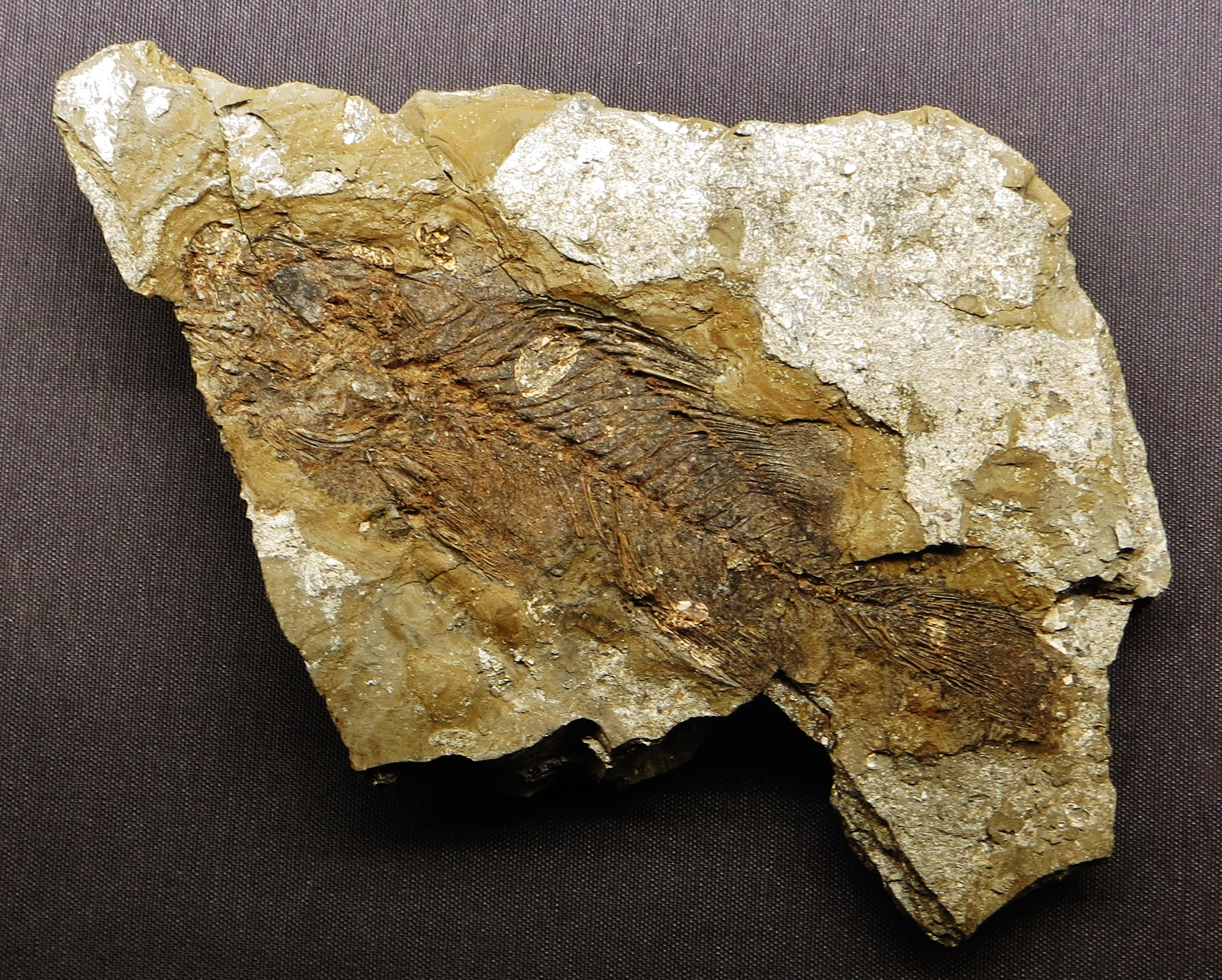
Fossil specimen of Morone sp. from Germany

The following fossil species are also known from Europe:

- †Morone aequalis (Koken, 1891) - Miocene of Germany (=Morone alsheimensis (Meyer, 1859))
- †Morone delheidi (Storms, 1893) - Oligocene of Belgium
- †Morone major (Agassiz, 1844) - Eocene of France
- †Morone shizurus (Agassiz, 1844) - Eocene of Italy
- ?†Morone ubinoi (Fischer von Waldenheim, 1850) - Cenozoic of Greece (nomen dubium)

The fossil species †Morone ionkoi Bannikov, 1993 may be potentially more closely related to Dicentrarchus. Many other fossil Morone species from the former Yugoslavian region likely do not belong to the Moronidae at all.
