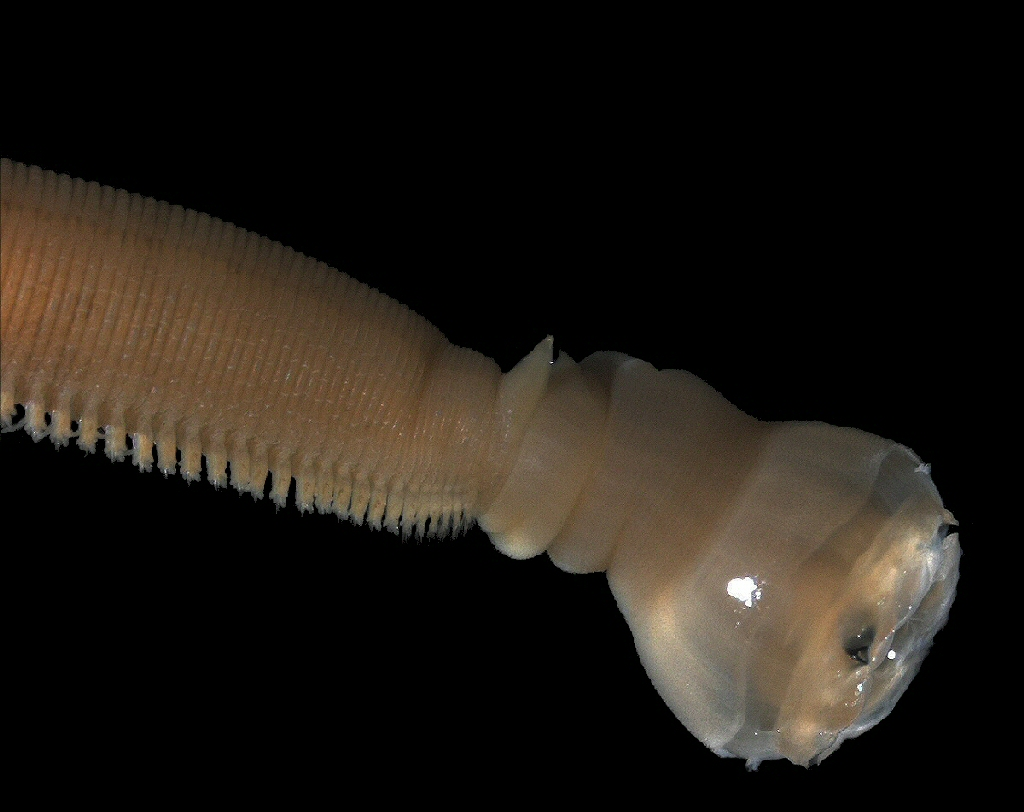
- Glycera alba with everted proboscis

Scientific classification
- Kingdom: Animalia
- Phylum: Annelida
- Clade: Pleistoannelida
- Subclass: Errantia
- Order: Phyllodocida
- Suborder: Glyceriformia
- Family: Glyceridae; Grube, 1850

Genera
- Glycera; Glycerella; Hamiglycera; Hemipodus; Rhynchobolus; Telake

= Glyceridae =

Family of annelids

Glyceridae is a family of polychaete worms. They are commonly referred to as beak-thrower worms or bloodworms. They are bright red, segmented, aquatic worms. The proboscis worm Glycera is sometimes called bloodworm. The Glyceridae are epi- and infaunal polychaetes that prey upon small invertebrates. They are errant burrowers that build galleries of interconnected tubes to aid in catching their prey.

== Characteristics ==
- Pointy snout used for burrowing in sediment
- No septa in anterior part of bodies
- Rely on peristalsis to move
- Explosively evert pharynx into sediment, anchor position with prostomium and pull body forward.
- Eversible pharynx also used in prey capture: 4 poisonous fangs
