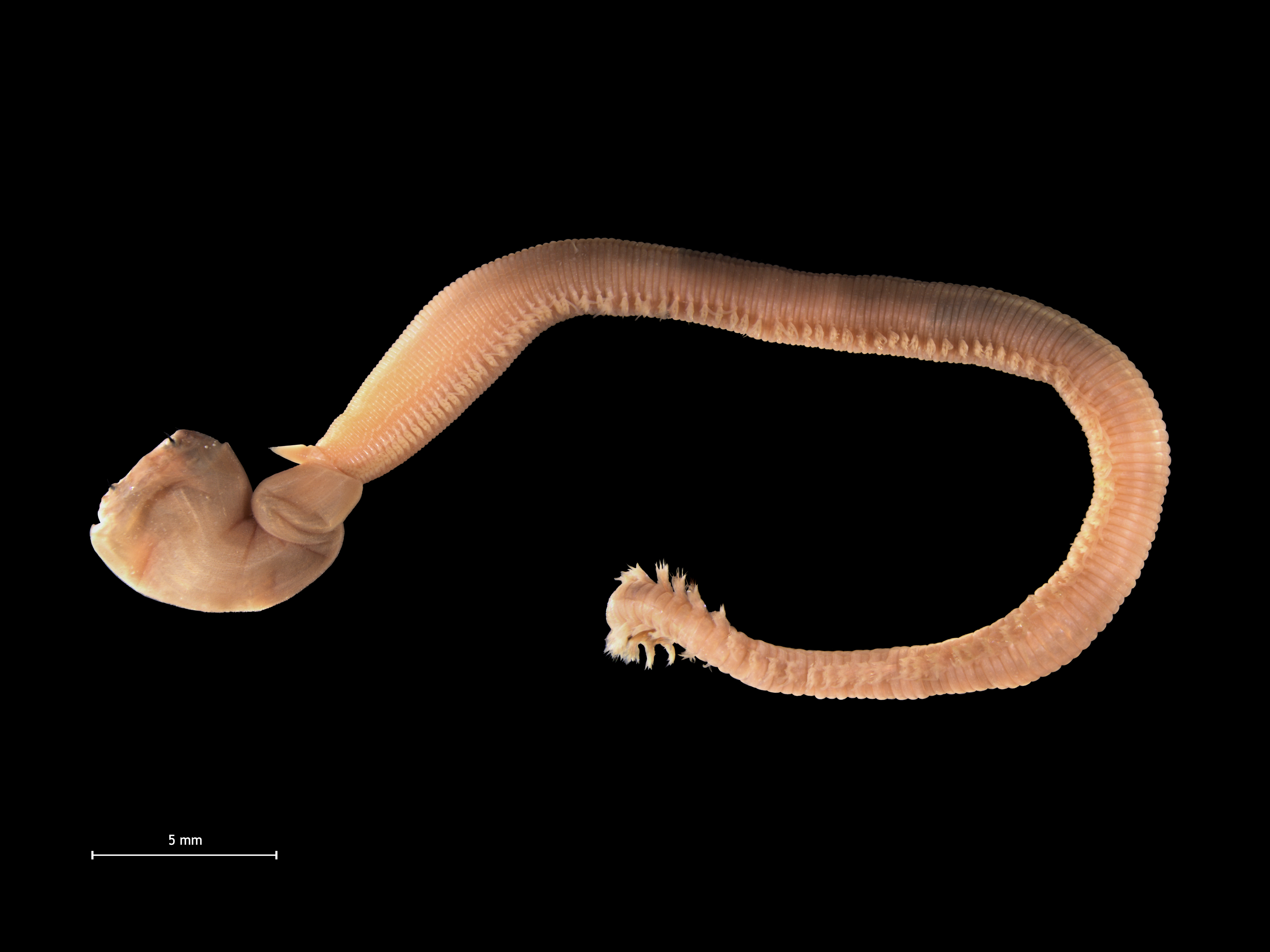
- Glycera alba

Scientific classification
- Kingdom: Animalia
- Phylum: Annelida
- Clade: Pleistoannelida
- Subclass: Errantia
- Order: Phyllodocida
- Family: Glyceridae
- Genus: Glycera; Savigny, 1818

Species
- Many, see text

= Glycera (annelid) =

Bloodworms

Genus of annelid worms

The genus Glycera is a group of polychaetes (bristle worms) commonly known as bloodworms. They are typically found on the bottom of shallow marine waters, and some species (e.g. common bloodworms) can grow up to 35 cm (14 in) in length.

Although both are visually similar and commonly used as fishing bait, bloodworms are biologically distinct from lugworms.

== Anatomy ==
Bloodworms have a creamy pink color, as their pale skin makes their red body fluids that contain haemoglobin visible. This is the origin of the name "bloodworm". At the 'head', bloodworms have four small antennae and small fleshy projections called parapodia running down their bodies. Bloodworms can grow up to 35 cm (14 in) in length.

Bloodworms are carnivorous. They feed by extending a large proboscis that bears four hollow jaws. The jaws are connected to glands that supply venom which they use to kill their prey, and their bite is painful even to a human. They are preyed on by other worms, bottom-feeding fish, crustacea, and gulls.

Reproduction occurs in midsummer, when the warmer water temperature and lunar cycle among other factors triggers sexually mature worms to transform into a non-feeding stage called the epitoke. With enlarged parapodia, they swim to the surface of the water where both sexes release gametes, and then die.

The first stage in many forms of bloodworm is a zooplanktonic stage followed by the benthic instar where the familiar segmented red larvae start to develop while protected by silk tubes made in the bottom silt. These larvae progress from small pale opaque worms to the larger red larvae of 3 to 10 centimeters (1.2 to 3.9 in) in length or longer over a period as short as 2–3 weeks in optimum conditions.

These animals are unique in that they contain a large amount of copper without being poisoned. Their jaws contain atacamite, a copper-based chloride biomineral, in a crystalline form. It is theorized that this copper is used as a catalyst for its venomous bite. In Glycera dibranchiata, the jaws are a composite of melanin and 10% copper.

== Systematics ==
Glycera is the type genus of the family Glyceridae. It contains the following species as of October 2023:

- Glycera africana Arwidsson, 1899
- Glycera alba (O.F. Müller, 1776)
- Glycera amadaiba Imajima, 2003
- Glycera amboinensis McIntosh, 1885
- Glycera americana Leidy, 1855
- Glycera asymmetrica Day, 1973
- Glycera baltica (Eisenack, 1939) †
- Glycera bassensis Böggemann & Fiege, 2001
- Glycera benguellana Augener, 1931
- Glycera benhami Böggemann & Fiege, 2001
- Glycera branchiopoda Moore, 1911
- Glycera brevicirris Grube, 1870
- Glycera calbucoensis Hartmann-Schröder, 1962
- Glycera capitata Örsted, 1842
- Glycera carnea Blanchard in Gay, 1849
- Glycera celtica O'Connor, 1987
- Glycera chirori Izuka, 1912
- Glycera cinnamomea Grube, 1874
- Glycera decipiens Marenzeller, 1879
- Glycera dentribranchia Lee, 1985
- Glycera derbyensis Hartmann-Schröder, 1979
- Glycera dibranchiata Ehlers, 1868
- Glycera diva Böggemann, 2009
- Glycera dubia (Blainville, 1825)
- Glycera ehlersi Arwidsson, 1899
- Glycera fallax Quatrefages, 1850
- Glycera fundicola Chamberlin, 1919
- Glycera gilbertae Böggemann & Fiege, 2001
- Glycera glaucopsammensis Charletta & Boyer, 1974 †
- Glycera guatemalensis Böggemann & Fiege, 2001
- Glycera guinensis Augener, 1918
- Glycera hasidatensis Izuka, 1912
- Glycera heteropoda Hartmann-Schröder, 1962
- Glycera incerta Hansen, 1882
- Glycera juliae Magalhães & Rizzo, 2012
- Glycera kerguelensis McIntosh, 1885
- Glycera knoxi Kirkegaard, 1995
- Glycera lamelliformis McIntosh, 1885
- Glycera lancadivae Schmarda, 1861
- Glycera lapidum Quatrefages, 1866
- Glycera longipinnis Grube, 1878
- Glycera macintoshi Grube, 1877
- Glycera macrobranchia Moore, 1911
- Glycera madagascariensis Böggemann & Fiege, 2001
- Glycera mauritiana Grube, 1870
- Glycera mexicana (Chamberlin, 1919)
- Glycera micrognatha Schmarda, 1861
- Glycera nana Johnson, 1901
- Glycera natalensis Day, 1957
- Glycera neorobusta Imajima, 2009
- Glycera nicobarica Grube, 1866
- Glycera noelae Böggemann, Bienhold & Gaudron, 2012
- Glycera okai Imajima, 2009
- Glycera onomichiensis Izuka, 1912
- Glycera ovigera Schmarda, 1861
- Glycera oxycephala Ehlers, 1887
- Glycera pacifica Kinberg, 1866
- Glycera papillosa Grube, 1857
- Glycera pilicae Szaniawski, 1974 †
- Glycera polygona Risso, 1826
- Glycera posterobranchia Hoagland, 1920
- Glycera profundi Chamberlin, 1919
- Glycera prosobranchia Böggemann & Fiege, 2001
- Glycera pseudorobusta Böggemann & Fiege, 2001
- Glycera robusta Ehlers, 1868
- Glycera russa Grube, 1870
- Glycera rutilans Grube in McIntosh, 1885
- Glycera sagittariae McIntosh, 1885
- Glycera semibranchiopoda Imajima, 2009
- Glycera sheikhmujibi Hossain & Hutchings, 2020
- Glycera southeastatlantica Böggemann, 2009
- Glycera sphyrabrancha Schmarda, 1861
- Glycera subaenea Grube, 1878
- Glycera taurica Czerniavsky, 1881
- Glycera tenuis Hartman, 1944
- Glycera tesselata Grube, 1863
- Glycera tridactyla Schmarda, 1861
- Glycera unicornis Lamarck, 1818

== Use by humans ==
Glycera worms are sold commercially in tackle shops as bait for saltwater fishing.
