= Sea bass =

Index of marine fish with the same common name

Sea bass is a common name for a variety of species of marine fish. Many fish species of various families have been called sea bass. This article, treats sea bass and seabass as interchangeable.

In the United Kingdom, bass or sea bass is legally defined as the European seabass or branzino, Dicentrarchus labrax, and spotted sea bass as D. punctatus.

In the United States, sea bass is an acceptable market name for Acanthistius brasilianus, Atractoscion nobilis, Caprodon longimanus, C. schlegelii, Centropristis ocyurus, C. philadelphica, C. striata, Dicentrarchus labrax, D. punctatus, Hemanthias leptus, H. peruanus, Lateolabrax japonicus, Paralabrax auroguttatus, P. callaensis, P. clathratus, P. maculatofasciatus, P. nebulifer, Paranthias colonus, P. furcifer, Paristiopterus spp., Polyprion americanus, P. oxygeneios. Branzino unambiguously means European sea bass.

In the Mediterranean, the most common sea bass is the European sea bass, Dicentrarchus labrax; somewhat less common is the spotted sea bass, D. punctatus. The Italian names branzino and spigola and the Greek name lavraki are sometimes used for these in fish markets and restaurants in the United States.

Fish referred to as sea bass include the following:

== Suborder Percoidei ==
=== Family Serranidae, the sea basses and basslets ===
- Genus Paralabrax (Rock basses. Regarded as important game fish in Southern California.)
  - Barred sand bass (Paralabrax nebulifer)
  - Spotted sand bass (P. maculatofasciatus), also known as the spotted bay bass.
  - Kelp bass (P. clathratus), also commonly called the calico bass.
- Genus Centropristis
  - Black sea bass (Centropristis striata), which can also be known as the Atlantic sea bass.
  - Bank sea bass (C. ocyurus)
  - Rock sea bass (C. philadelphica)
- Genus Serranus (Atlantic dwarf sea basses)
  - Serranus cabrilla - comber
  - Serranus scriba - painted comber
  - Serranus fusculus - two-spot sea bass, or Poey's bass (previously under centropristis)
- Genus Serraniculus
  - Serraniculus pumilio - pygmy sea bass

=== Family Anthiadidae, the Anthias, fairy basslets, or streamer basses ===
- Genus Caesioperca
  - Butterfly perch (Caesioperca Lepidoptera) is found in the eastern Indian Ocean and the southwest Pacific Ocean, including southern Australia and New Zealand.
- Genus Trachypoma
  - Toadstool groper (Trachypoma macracanthus) is found in the southwest Pacific Ocean.
- Genus Caprodon
  - Pink maomao (Caprodon longimanus) is found in the eastern Indian Ocean and the southern Pacific Ocean, including Australia and New Zealand.
- Genus Hypoplectrodes
  - Redbanded perch (Hypoplectrodes huntii) is found in southeastern Australia and the North Island and northern South Island of New Zealand.

=== Family Epinephelidae, the groupers ===
- Genus Epinephelus (groupers)
  - Potato cod (Epinephelus tukula), also known as the potato bass or potato grouper, is a large reef fish found in the Indian and Pacific Oceans.
  - Dusky grouper (Epinephelus marginatus)
  - Dogtooth grouper (Epinephelus caninus)
  - Many other species in this genus can be called sea bass.
- Genus Cephalopholis (hinds)
  - Cephalopholis miniata - vermilion sea bass, or coral grouper
  - Cephalopholis taeniops - blue-spotted sea bass
  - Cephalopholis sonnerati - tomato seabass, tomato hind, or tomato grouper
- Genus Variola (lyretails)
  - Variola louti - Moontail sea bass, chameleon sea bass, or yellow-edged lyretail

== Order Acropmatiformes ==
=== Family Latidae, the Lates Perches ===
- Genus Hypopterus
  - Hypopterus macropterus - spikey seabass
- Genus Lates (Lates sea basses)
  - Lates calcarifer (Bloch, 1790) - barramundi, or Lates sea bass
  - Lates japonicus (Katayama & Y. Taki, 1984) - Japanese lates sea bass
- Genus Psammoperca
  - Psammoperca waigiensis - Waigeo sea bass

=== Family Moronidae ===
- Genus Dicentrarchus (European sea basses)
  - Dicentrarchus labrax - European sea bass, Branzino, or sea dace. A majorly important commercial fish, especially in aquaculture.
  - Dicentrarchus punctatus - spotted sea bass
- Genus Morone
  - Morone saxatilis - striped bass, or striped sea bass
  - Hybrid striped bass (Morone chrysops × M. saxatilis), also known as the wiper, may be sold commercially as hybrid seabass.

=== Family Stereolepididae ===
- Genus Stereolepis
  - Stereolepis gigas - giant sea bass, pacific black sea bass, or giant black sea bass. They are off the coast of California and Baja California, and may grow in excess of 225 kg (496 lb).
  - Stereolepis doederleini - striped giant sea bass, or striped jewfish.

=== Family Lateolabracidae ===
- Genus Lateolabrax - (Japanese sea basses. These fish are commonly used in Japanese, Korean, and Chinese cuisines, and are also commonly called suzuki.)
  - Lateolabrax japonicus (G. Cuvier, 1828) - Japanese sea bass
  - Lateolabrax latus (Katayama, 1957) - blackfin sea bass

=== Family Malakichthyidae ===
- Genus Hemilutjanus
  - Hemilutjanus macrophthalmos - grape-eye seabass
- Genus Malakichthys
  - Malakichthys elegans (Matsubara & Yamaguti, 1943) – splendid seabass
  - Malakichthys griseus (Döderlein (de), 1883) – silvergray seabass
  - Malakichthys levis (Yamanoue & Matsuura, 2002) – smooth seabass
  - Malakichthys mochizuki (Yamanoue & Matsuura, 2002) – Mochizuki's seabass

=== Family Ostracoberycidae ===
- Genus Ostracoberyx
  - Ostracoberyx paxtoni (Quéro & Ozouf-Costaz, 1991) - spinycheek seabass

== Other ==
=== Family Sciaenidae, the drums and croakers ===
- Genus Atractoscion
  - Atractoscion nobilis - white seabass, or white weakfish. Found along the Pacific coast of the United States and Baja California.
- Genus Pseudotolithus
  - Pseudotolithus senegalensis - cassava croaker
  - Pseudotolithus typus - longneck croaker

=== Family Nototheniidae, the cod icefishes ===
- Genus Dissostichus (Toothfishes)
  - Dissostichus eleginoides - Patagonian toothfish, but commonly referred to by its marketing term, Chilean sea bass.
  - Dissostichus mawsoni - Antarctic toothfish, also sold commercially as Chilean sea bass.

These lists do not include other species in the above families that may erroneously be referred to as sea bass due to resemblance or relation to the species mentioned above.
