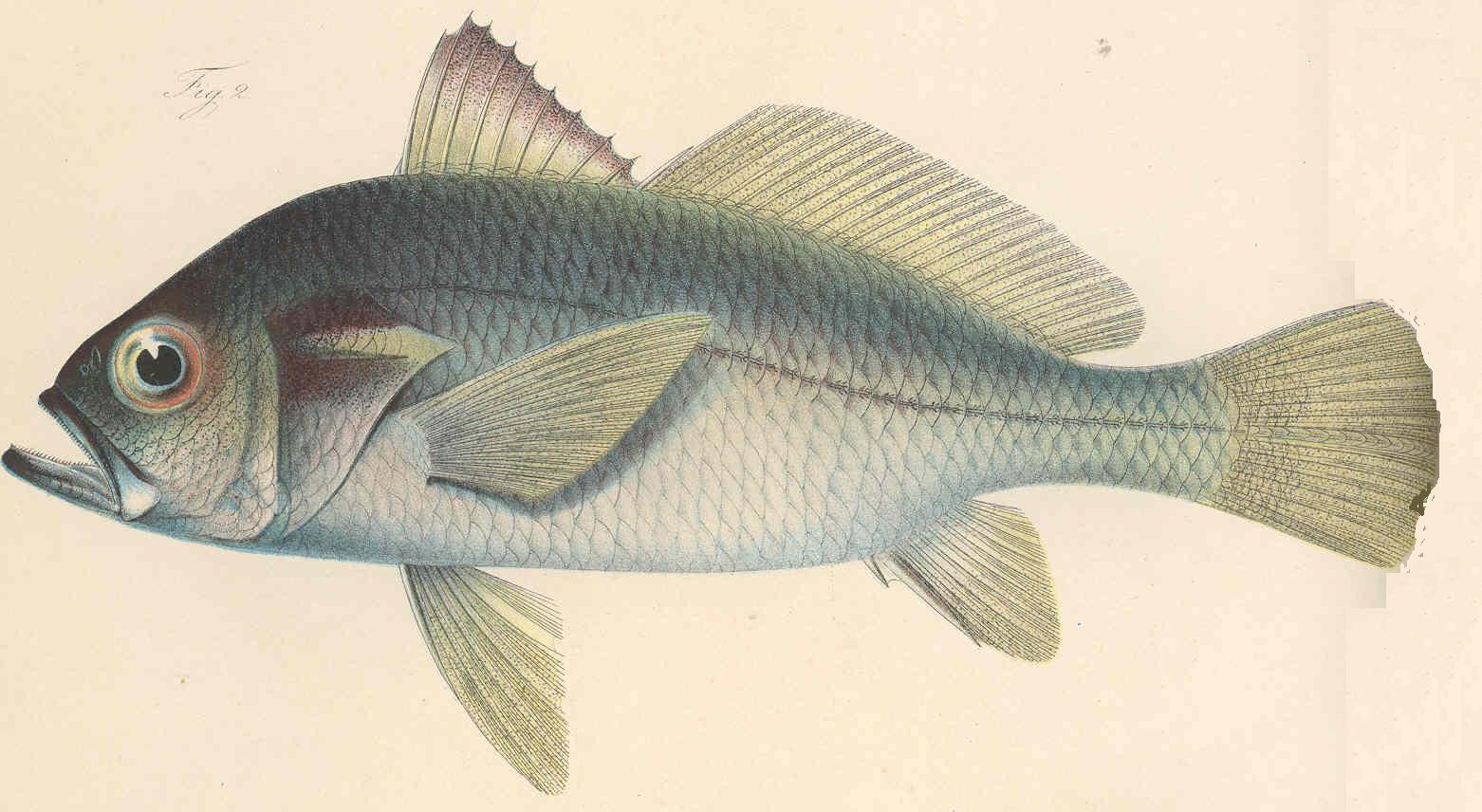

Conservation status
- Least Concern (IUCN 3.1)

Scientific classification
- Kingdom: Animalia
- Phylum: Chordata
- Class: Actinopterygii
- Order: Acanthuriformes
- Family: Sciaenidae
- Genus: Pteroscion; Fowler, 1925
- Species: P. peli

Binomial name
- Pteroscion peli Bleeker, 1863

Synonyms
- Larimus peli Bleeker, 1863

= Boe drum =

Species of fish

The boe drum (Pteroscion peli) is a species of marine ray-finned fish belonging to the family Sciaenidae, the drums and croakers. It is the only species in the monospecific genus Pteroscion. The boe drum is found in the eastern Atlantic Ocean off western coast of Africa.

== Taxonomy ==
The boe drum was first formally described in 1863 as Larimus peli by the Dutch physician, herpetologist and ichthyologist Pieter Bleeker with its type locality give as Ebriakwa in Guinea. In 1925 Henry Weed Fowler classified L. peli in the new monospecific genus Pteroscion. Ethelwynn Trewavas placed the eastern Atlantic Afrotropical sciaenids, Pseudotolithus and Pteroscion, in the tribe Pseudotolithini. Other workers have placed this tribe in the subfamily Pseudotolithinae alongside the tribe Miracorvini, Miracorvina and Pentheroscion. However, the 5th edition of Fishes of the World does not recognise tribes or subfamilies within the Sciaenidae which it places in the order Acanthuriformes.

== Etymology ==
The boe drum's generic name, Pteroscion, is a combination of ptero, meaning "fin" and scion, a modern Greek name for the shi drum (Umbrina cirrosa). This form was preferred to sciaena by Fowler and Theodore Gill as in Cynoscion. The specific name honours Hendrik Severinus Pel, who was governor of the Dutch Gold Coast who deposited many specimens in the Rijksmuseum van Natuurlijke Historie in Leiden, including the type of the Boe drum.

== Distribution and habitat ==
The boe drum is found in the eastern Atlantic Ocean between Senegal and Namibia. It is found in marine and brackish waters where it is a benthopelagic fish living in coastal waters over sand and mud bottoms at depths between 0 and 500 m (0 and 1,640 ft), although it is typically not found deeper than 50 m (160 ft).

== Biology ==
The boe drum spawns in estuaries and possibly offshore too. It feeds on worms, cephalopods, crustaceans and smaller fishes.
