= Three-spined cardinalfish =

Scientific classification
- Kingdom: Animalia
- Phylum: Chordata
- Class: Actinopterygii
- Order: Acropomatiformes
- Family: Malakichthyidae
- Genus: Verilus
- Species: V. anomalus

Binomial name
- Verilus anomalus (J. D. Ogilby, 1896)

Synonyms
- Apogonops anomalus Ogilby, 1896

Species of ray-finned fish

The Three-spined cardinalfish (Verilus anomalus) is a species of ray-finned fish in the family Malakichthyidae. It is endemic to the marine waters off of Australia. Another name for this species of fish is Flathead feed.

This fish occurs as deep as 600 metres (2,000 ft), but usually stays between 100 and 400 metres (330 and 1,310 ft). It grows to a length of 15 centimetres (5.9 in) SL.

Hector's lanternfish (Lampanyctodes hectoris) is an important part of its diet.

It was formerly placed in the monotypic genus Apogonops, which is now considered a synonym of Verilus.
