= Malakichthys wakiyae =

Scientific classification
- Kingdom: Animalia
- Phylum: Chordata
- Class: Actinopterygii
- Order: Acropomatiformes
- Family: Malakichthyidae
- Genus: Malakichthys
- Species: M. wakiyae

Binomial name
- Malakichthys wakiyae Jordan & Hubbs, 1925

Species of ray-finned fish

Malakichthys wakiyae is a species of deep-water ray-finned fish native to the Western Pacific, from Taiwan to the southern Sea of Japan (Korea, Japan) and New Ireland (Papua New Guinea).
