= Malakichthys similis =

Scientific classification
- Kingdom: Animalia
- Phylum: Chordata
- Class: Actinopterygii
- Order: Acropomatiformes
- Family: Malakichthyidae
- Genus: Malakichthys
- Species: M. similis

Binomial name
- Malakichthys similis Yamanoue & Matsuura, 2004

Species of ray-finned fish

Malakichthys similis is a species of deep-water ray-finned fish native to Mindanao Island, Philippines.
