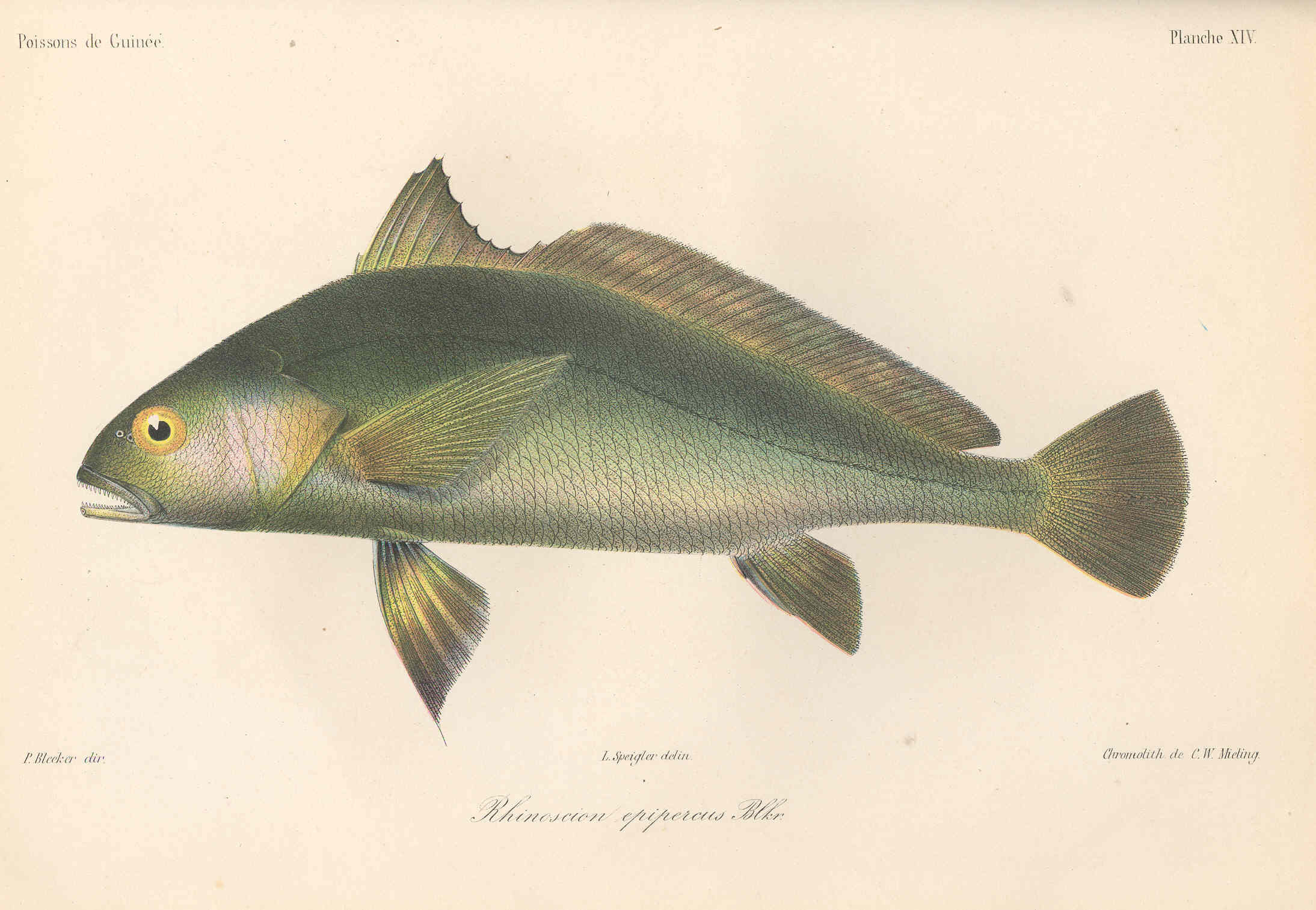
- Pseudotolithus epipercus

Scientific classification
- Kingdom: Animalia
- Phylum: Chordata
- Class: Actinopterygii
- Order: Acanthuriformes
- Family: Sciaenidae
- Genus: Pseudotolithus; Bleeker, 1863

Type species
- Pseudotolithus typus Bleeker, 1863

Species
- Several, see text

= Pseudotolithus =

Genus of fishes

Pseudotolithus is a genus of marine ray-finned fish belonging to the family Sciaenidae, the drums or croakers. The species in this genus are found in the Eastern Atlantic Ocean.

== Taxonomy ==
Pseudotolithus was first proposed as a genus in 1863 by the Dutch physician, herpetologist and ichthyologist Pieter Bleeker when he described the new species P. brachygnathus, P. epipercus and P. typus. P. typus was designated as the type species by virtue of being named typus. Ethelwynn Trewavas placed the eastern Atlantic Afrotropical sciaenids, Pseudotolithus and Pteroscion, in the tribe Pseudotolithini. Other workers have placed this tribe in the subfamily Pseudotolithinae alongside the tribe Miracorvini, Miracorvina and Pentheroscion. However, the 5th edition of Fishes of the World does not recognise tribes or subfamilies within the Sciaenidae which it places in the order Acanthuriformes.

== Etymology ==
Pseudotolithus prefixes Otolithus with pseudo meaning "false" due to Bleeker's perceived false resemblance between these fishes and those of that genus.

== Species ==
Pseudotolithus has the following valid species classified within it:

- Pseudotolithus brachygnathus Bleeker, 1863
- Pseudotolithus elongatus (Bowdich, 1825) (bobo croaker)
- Pseudotolithus epipercus (Bleeker, 1863) (Guinea croaker)
- Pseudotolithus moorii (Günther, 1865) (Cameroon croaker)
- Pseudotolithus senegalensis (Valenciennes, 1833) (cassava croaker)
- Pseudotolithus senegallus (Cuvier, 1830) (law croaker)
- Pseudotolithus typus (Bleeker, 1863) (longneck croaker)

== Characteristics ==
Pseudotolithus croakers have a carrot-shaped swim bladder running the whole length of the body cavity with a pair of long tube-like appendages growing out of its front. These appendages branch into as many as 32 tubules. They do not have any barbels on the chin. The largest species in the genus is the law croaker (P. senegallus) which has a maximum published total length of 230 cm (91 in) while the smallest is the bobo croaker (P. elongatus) at 47 cm (19 in).

== Distribution ==
Pseudotolithus croakers are found in the Eastern Atlantic Ocean from Morocco in the north to Angola in the south.
