= Verilus pseudomicrolepis =

Scientific classification
- Kingdom: Animalia
- Phylum: Chordata
- Class: Actinopterygii
- Order: Acropomatiformes
- Family: Malakichthyidae
- Genus: Verilus
- Species: V. pseudomicrolepis

Binomial name
- Verilus pseudomicrolepis (Schultz, 1940)

Synonyms
- Synagrops pseudomicrolepis Schultz, 1940

Species of ray-finned fish

Verilus pseudomicrolepis is a species of ray-finned fish in the family Malakichthyidae. It lives at a depth of approximately 200–600 metres and mainly inhabits the Caribbean Sea, reaching a length of around 14.5 centimetres.
