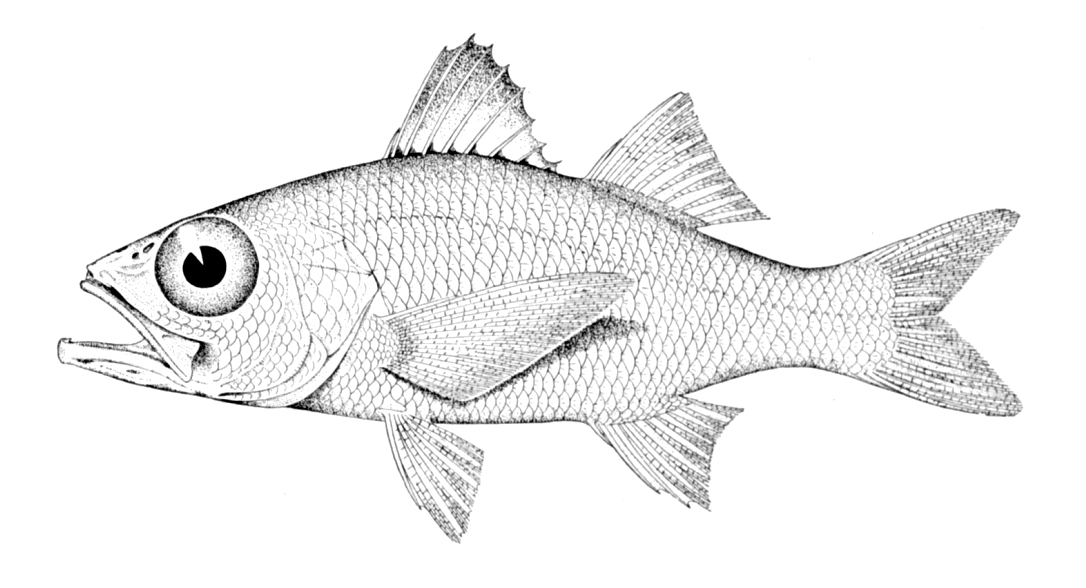

Conservation status
- Least Concern (IUCN 3.1)

Scientific classification
- Kingdom: Animalia
- Phylum: Chordata
- Class: Actinopterygii
- Order: Acropomatiformes
- Family: Malakichthyidae
- Genus: Verilus
- Species: V. sordidus

Binomial name
- Verilus sordidus Poey, 1860

= Verilus sordidus =

Species of ray-finned fish

Verilus sordidus is a species of ray-finned fish in the family Malakichthyidae. It is native to the central western Atlantic Ocean. It is found in the waters off Cuba to Colombia and Venezuela where it is found at depths shallower than 100 metres (330 ft) over rocky bottoms.

This species grows to a length of 30 centimetres (12 in) TL though most do not exceed 20 centimetres (7.9 in). It can be distinguished from other fish in its genus by several characters, including villiform teeth on the upper jaw and conical teeth on the lower, with large canine teeth, and the number of spines and rays in its fins.
