= Maomao =

Maomao may refer to:

== Fish species ==
- Blue maomao, Scorpis violacea
- Green damselfish, Abudefduf abdominalis
- Pink maomao, Caprodon longimanus

== Other uses ==
- Deng Rong's penname, under which she wrote the biography of her father Deng Xiaoping
- Maomao (The Apothecary Diaries), the protagonist of a series of novels written by Hyūganatsu
