= Variola (disambiguation) =

Variola is a Latin name for smallpox.

Variola may also refer to:

- Variola (fish), a genus of fish

== See also ==
- Variola caprina, the virus that causes goatpox
- Variola porcina, the virus that causes swinepox
- Variola vera, another Latin name for smallpox
- Variola Vera, a 1982 Serbian film about the 1972 Yugoslav smallpox outbreak
