= Malakichthys barbatus =

Scientific classification
- Domain: Eukaryota
- Kingdom: Animalia
- Phylum: Chordata
- Class: Actinopterygii
- Order: Acropomatiformes
- Family: Malakichthyidae
- Genus: Malakichthys
- Species: M. barbatus

Binomial name
- Malakichthys barbatus Yamanoue & Yoseda, 2001

Species of ray-finned fish

Malakichthys barbatus is a species of ray-finned fish found in the oceans of the Indo-west Pacific: Japan, South China Sea and Australia at depths ranging from 100 – 600 meters.
