= Caprodon unicolor =

Scientific classification
- Kingdom: Animalia
- Phylum: Chordata
- Class: Actinopterygii
- Order: Perciformes
- Family: Anthiadidae
- Genus: Caprodon
- Species: C. unicolor

Binomial name
- Caprodon unicolor Katayama, 1975

Species of ray-finned fish

Caprodon unicolor, the elegant anthias, is a species of marine ray-finned fish. It is a member of the family Anthiadidae. It is endemic to the Hawaiian Islands.
