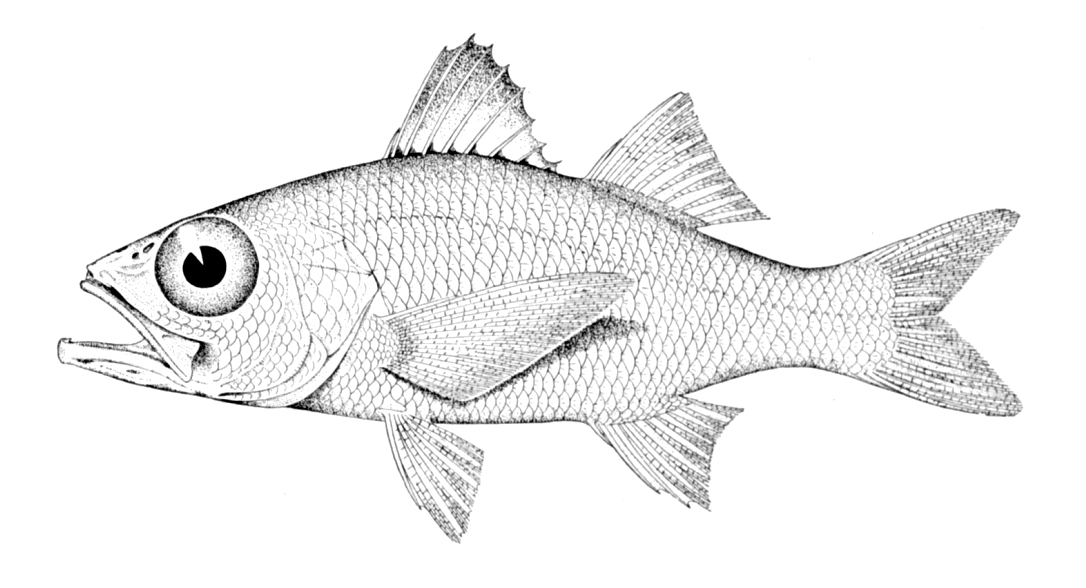
- Verilus sordidus

Scientific classification
- Kingdom: Animalia
- Phylum: Chordata
- Class: Actinopterygii
- Order: Acropomatiformes
- Family: Malakichthyidae
- Genus: Verilus; Poey, 1860

Type species
- Verilus sordidus Poey, 1860

= Verilus =

Genus of fishes

Verilus is a genus of ray-finned fish in the family Malakichthyidae found in the Atlantic.

== Species ==
There are currently 8 recognized species in this genus:

- Verilus atlanticus (Mochizuki & Sano, 1984)
- Verilus anomalus (Ogilby, 1896) (three-spined cardinalfish)
- Verilus costai Schwarzhans, Mincarone & Villarins, 2020
- Verilus cynodon (Regan, 1921) (Silver splitfin)
- Verilus pacificus (Mochizuki, 1979)
- Verilus pseudomicrolepis (Schultz, 1940)
- Verilus sordidus Poey, 1860
- Verilus starnesi Yamanoue, 2016
