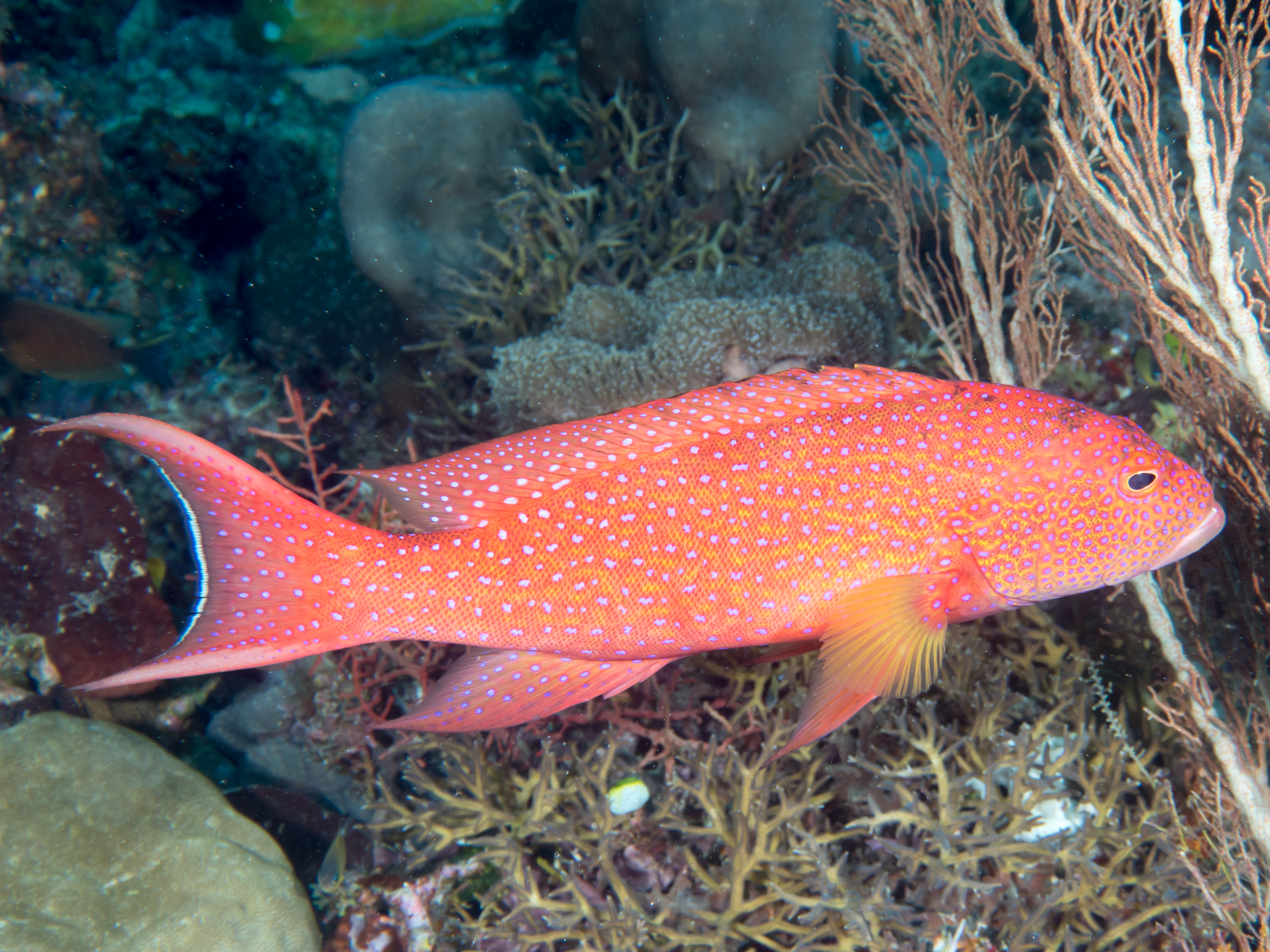
- In Indonesia

Conservation status
- Least Concern (IUCN 3.1)

Scientific classification
- Kingdom: Animalia
- Phylum: Chordata
- Class: Actinopterygii
- Division: Teleostei
- Order: Perciformes
- Family: Epinephelidae
- Genus: Variola
- Species: V. albimarginata

Binomial name
- Variola albimarginata Baissac, 1953

= White-edged lyretail =

Species of fish

The white-edged lyretail (Variola albimarginata), also known as the white-edge coronation trout, lyretail grouper, lyretail trout, white-edged lyretail-cod or white-fringed moontail-bass, is a species of marine ray-finned fish, a grouper from the subfamily Epinephelinae which is part of the family Serranidae, which also includes the anthias and sea basses. It is found in the Indo-Pacific region but it is an uncommon species.

== Taxonomy ==
The white-edged lyretail was first formally described by J. de Baissac in 1953 with the type locality given as Mauritius. Despite this, historically the species was often overlooked or misidentified as the larger and more common yellow-edged lyretail (V. louti).

== Distribution ==
The white-edged lyretail has a wide Indo-Pacific distribution. It ranges from the East African coasts between Kenya and Mozambique including Zanzibar and Mafia Island, across the Indian Ocean to the Seychelles, southwestern India and Sri Lanka and into the Pacific Ocean, north as far as the Ryukyu Islands of southern Japan, east to Samoa and the Cook Islands and south to Australia.

In Australia it is found from the Scott Reef in Western Australia, the Ashmore Reef in the Timor Sea to the Capricorn Group in the southern Great Barrier Reef of Queensland.

== Description ==
The white edged lyretail has an oblong shaped body on which the length of the head is longer than the depth of the body, the standard length of its body is 2.8-3.5 times its depth. The preopercle is rounded with fine serrations along its edge with the lower edge being fleshy. There are three flat spines on the gill cover, which has a straight upper edge. The dorsal fin contains 9 spines and 14 soft rays while the anal fin contains 3 spines and 8 soft rays. The caudal fin is crescent shaped with its upper and lower lobes extended and are around two times the length of the fin's middle rays.

The overall colour of this grouper is reddish and it is covered in blue spots. The caudal fin has pale upper and lower margins and the central rays of the caudal fin rays have white tips creating a thin white line along its margin. There are occasionally faint, pale saddles on the back. It also has yellow wavy lines on its body and reddish spots on the head. The dorsal, anal and caudal fins have red to purple spots. This species attains a maximum recorded total length of 65 centimetres (26 in).

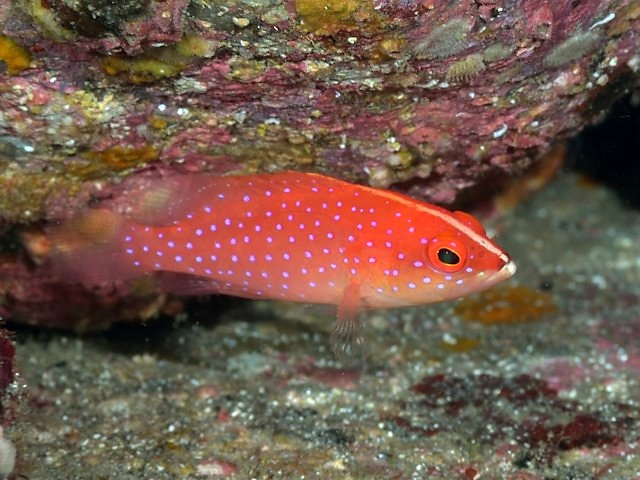
Growth series, from youngest juvenile to adult

== Habitat and biology ==
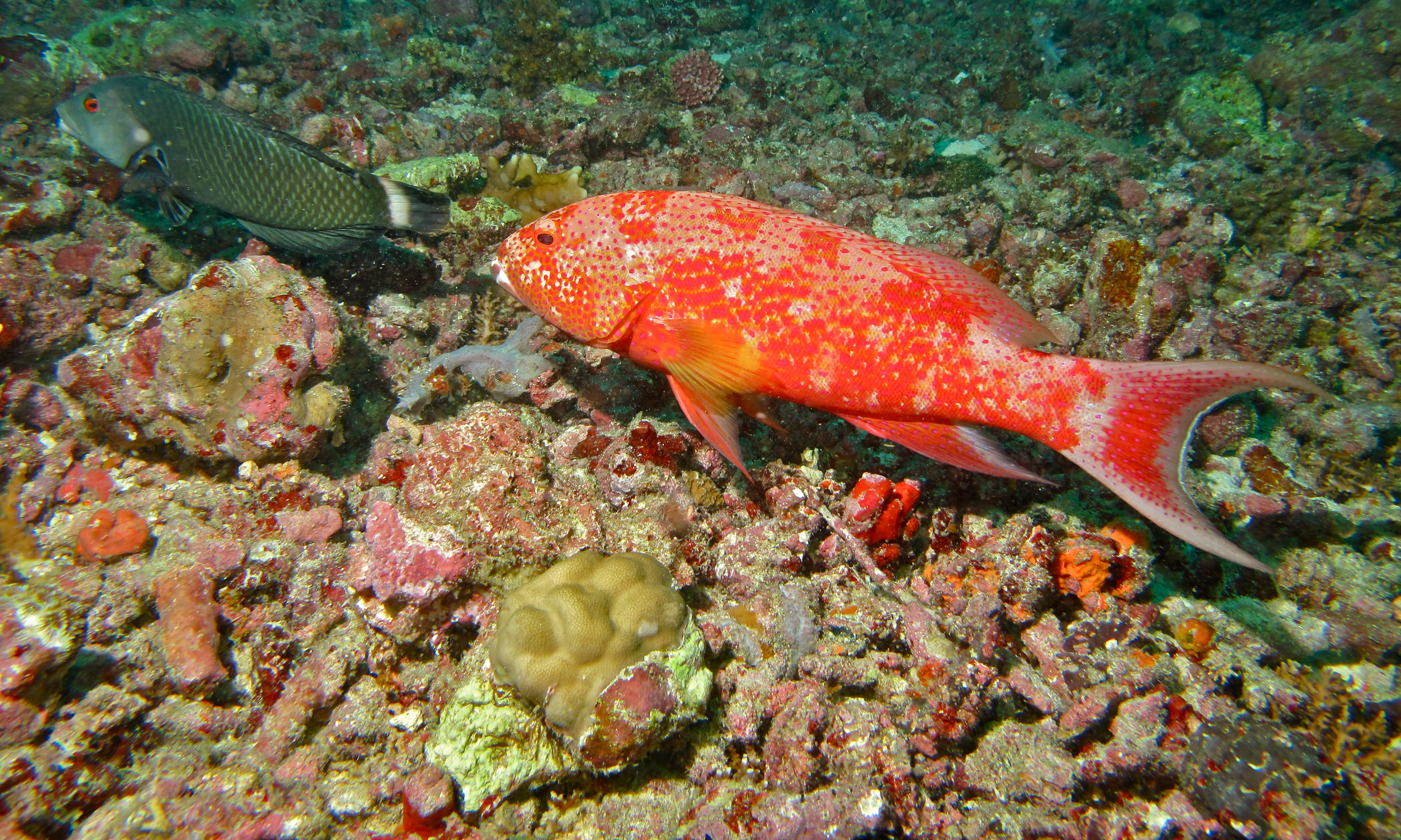
In Malaysia

The white-edged lyretail is a generally uncommon species which is found either as a solitary fish or in small groups on the seaward edge of reefs. The juveniles are found inshore on algae and soft coral reefs where they usually swim quite high in the water column like basslets It is largely piscivorous. They are not known to form spawning aggregations. Females are sexually mature at a standard length of 32 centimetres (13 in).

== Utilisation ==
The white-edged lyretail is considered to be excellent eating but its relatively small size and scarcity mean that it is of little interest to fisheries. It is taken with hand lines, spears and traps.
