= Malakichthys elegans =

Scientific classification
- Kingdom: Animalia
- Phylum: Chordata
- Class: Actinopterygii
- Order: Acropomatiformes
- Family: Malakichthyidae
- Genus: Malakichthys
- Species: M. elegans

Binomial name
- Malakichthys elegans Matsubara & Yamaguti, 1943

Species of ray-finned fish

Malakichthys elegans, the splendid sea bass, is a species of marine ray-finned fish belonging to the family Malakichthyidae. It is found in the Indo-Pacific region.
