= Malakichthys levis =

Scientific classification
- Kingdom: Animalia
- Phylum: Chordata
- Class: Actinopterygii
- Order: Acropomatiformes
- Family: Malakichthyidae
- Genus: Malakichthys
- Species: M. levis

Binomial name
- Malakichthys levis Yamanoue & Matsuura, 2002

Species of ray-finned fish

Malakichthys levis is a species of ray-finned fish in the family Malakichthyidae.
