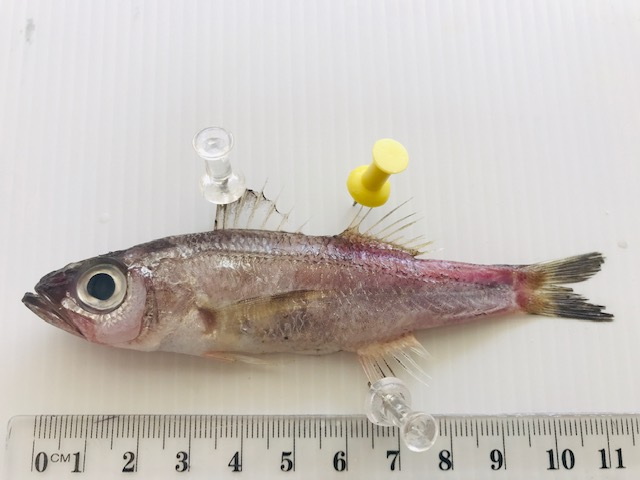

Scientific classification
- Kingdom: Animalia
- Phylum: Chordata
- Class: Actinopterygii
- Order: Acropomatiformes
- Family: Malakichthyidae
- Genus: Malakichthys
- Species: M. mochizuki

Binomial name
- Malakichthys mochizuki Yamanoue & Matsuura, 2002

= Malakichthys mochizuki =

Species of ray-finned fish

Malakichthys mochizuki, Mochizuki's seabass, is a species of marine ray-finned fish belonging to the family Malakichthyidae. It is found in Australian waters.
