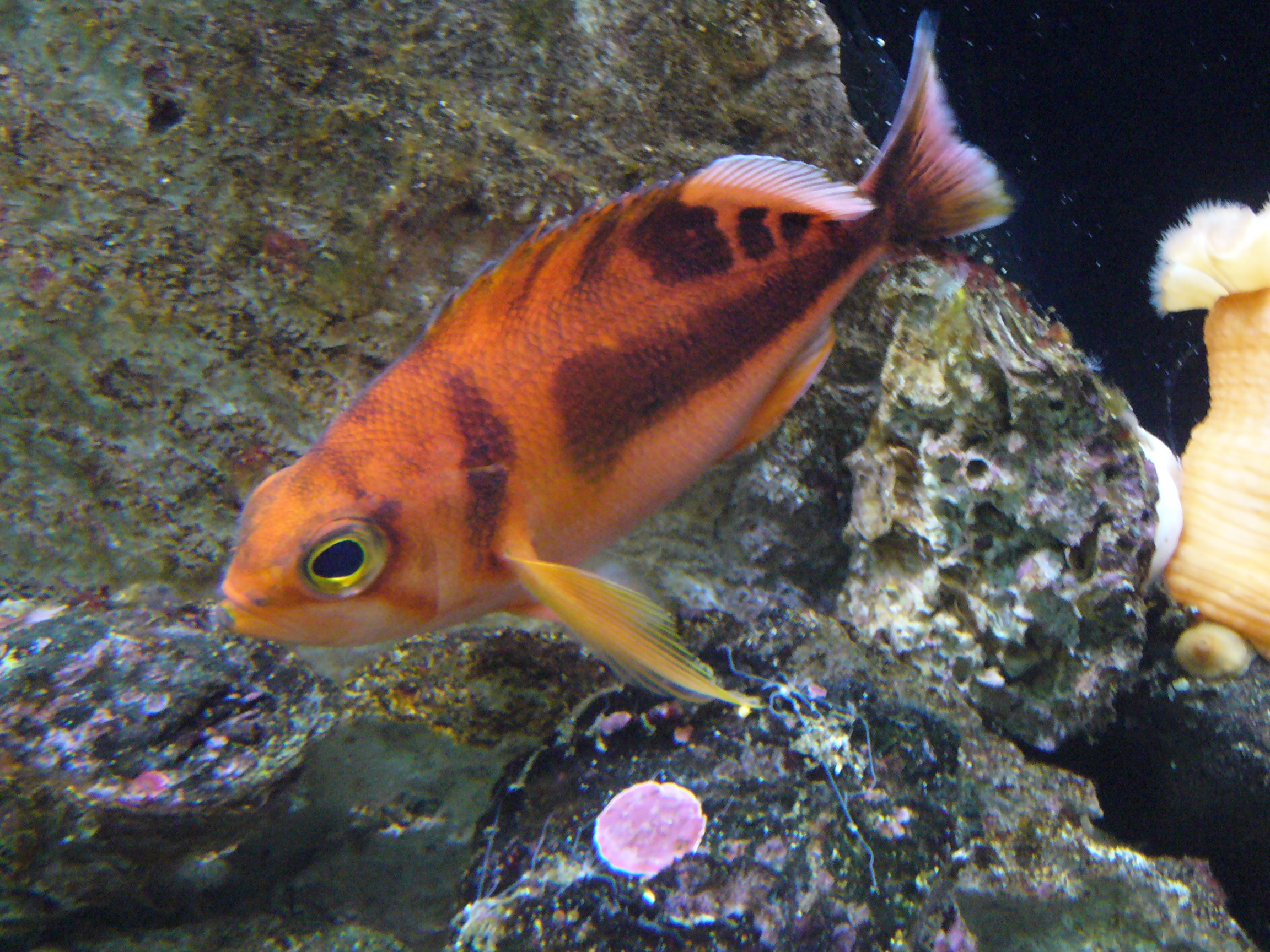
- Sunrise perch (Caprodon schlegelii)
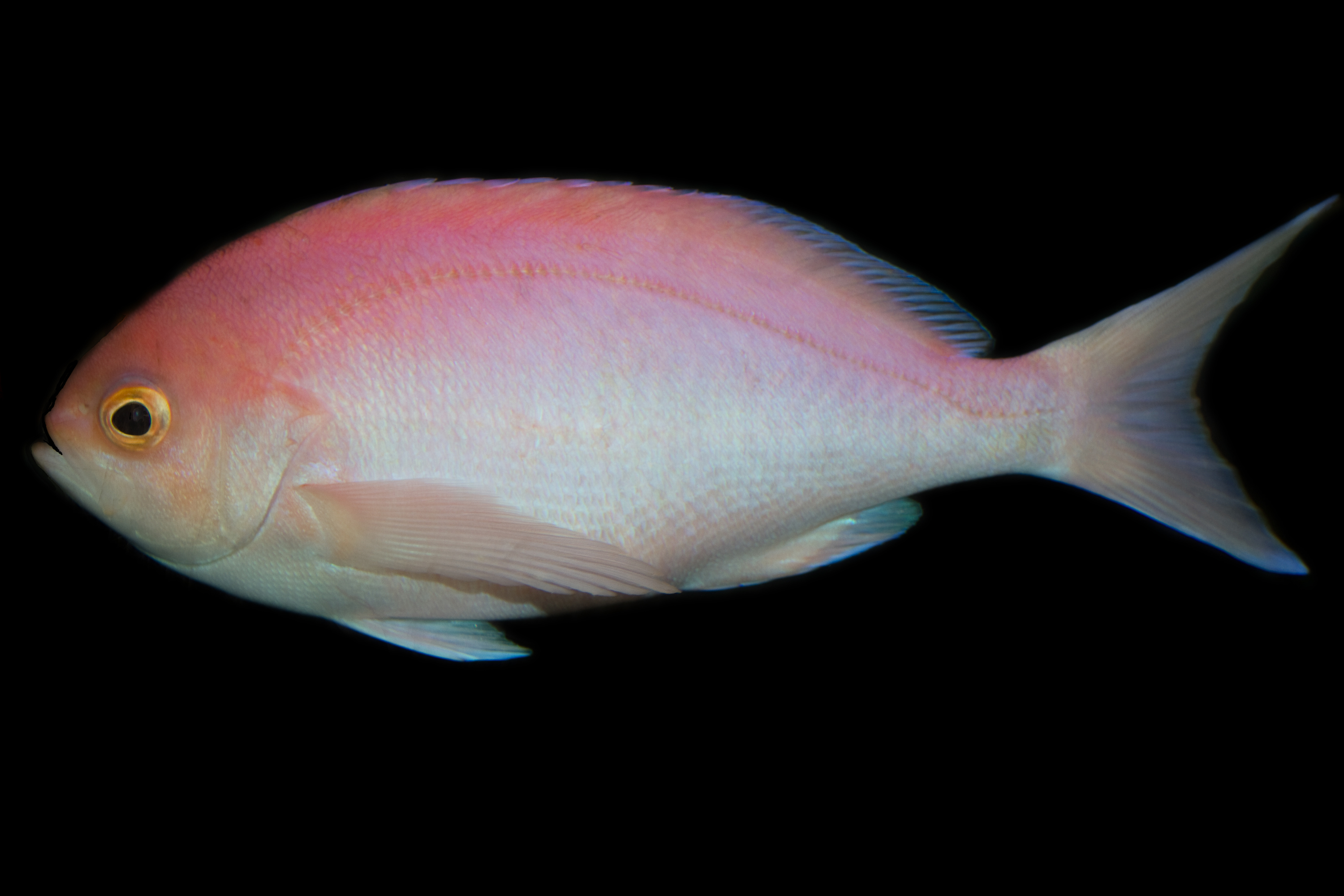
- Pink maomao (Caprodon longimanus)

Scientific classification
- Kingdom: Animalia
- Phylum: Chordata
- Class: Actinopterygii
- Division: Teleostei
- Order: Perciformes
- Family: Anthiadidae
- Genus: Caprodon; Temminck & Schlegel, 1843

Type species
- Anthias schlegelii Günther, 1859

Synonyms
- Neoanthias Castelnau 1879

= Caprodon =

Genus of ray-finned fishes

Caprodon is a small genus of ray-finned fish belonging to the family Anthiadidae. It contains three species.

== Taxonomy ==
Caprodon was first established by Coenraad Jacob Temminck and Hermann Schlegel in 1843 based on the type species Anthias schlegelii.

== Description ==
The genus Caprodon can be distinguished from Odontanthias and other anthias with teeth on the tongue, by the asymmetrical pectoral fins, the truncate caudal fin, the presence of a scaly dorsal sheath, and by the many-rayed soft dorsal fin.

== Species ==
FishBase recognizes five species of Caprodon:

- Caprodon affinis Tanaka, 1924
- Caprodon krasyukovae Kharin, 1983 (Krasyukova's perch)
- Caprodon longimanus (Günther, 1859) (Pink maomao)
- Caprodon schlegelii (Günther, 1859) (Sunrise perch)
- Caprodon unicolor Katayama, 1975 (Elegant anthias)
