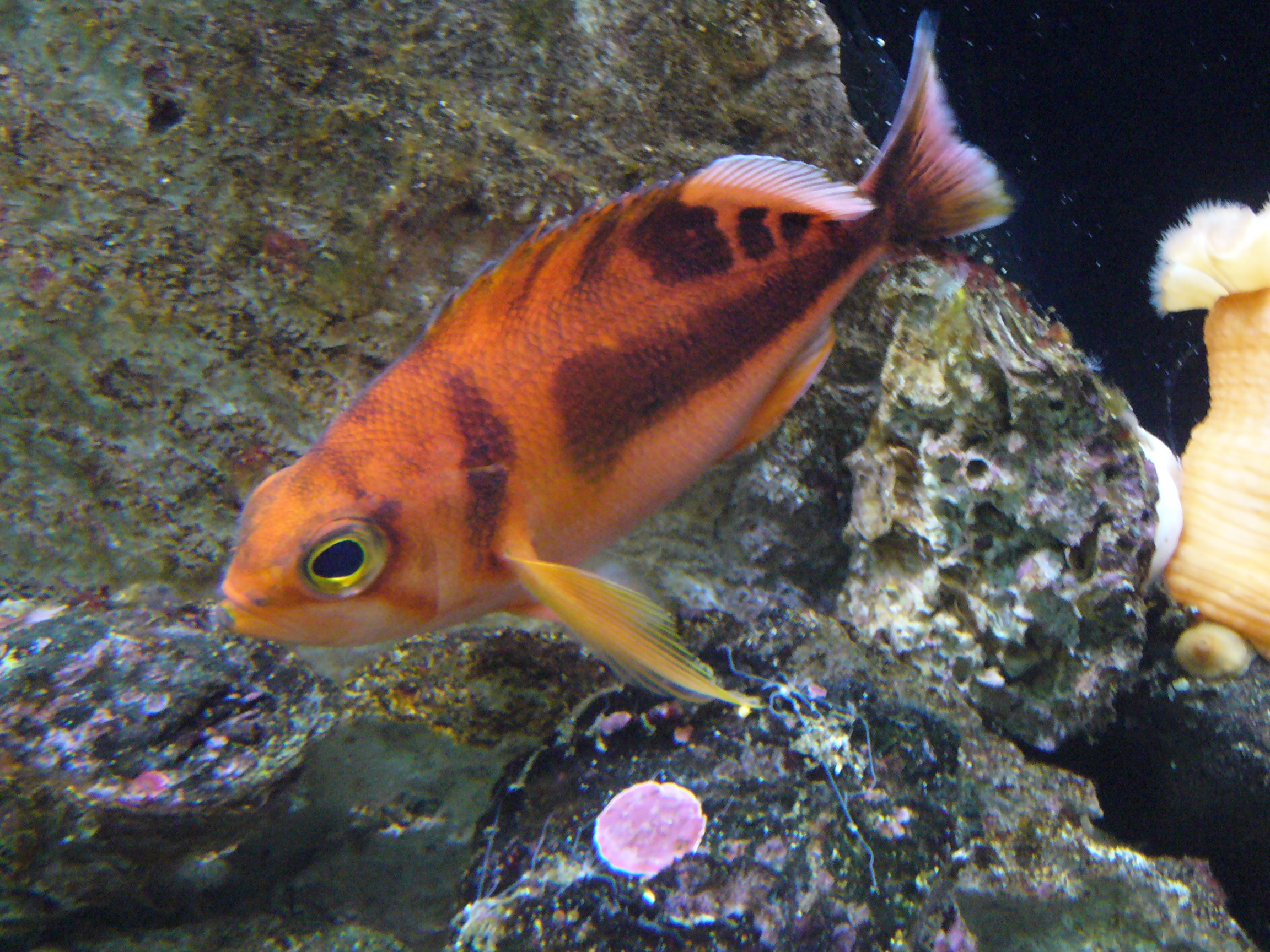

Conservation status
- Least Concern (IUCN 3.1)

Scientific classification
- Kingdom: Animalia
- Phylum: Chordata
- Class: Actinopterygii
- Order: Perciformes
- Family: Anthiadidae
- Genus: Caprodon
- Species: C. schlegelii

Binomial name
- Caprodon schlegelii (Günther, 1859)

Synonyms
- Anthias schlegelii Günther, 1859; Caprodon affinis Tanaka, 1924

= Caprodon schlegelii =

Species of ray-finned fish

Caprodon schlegelii, the sunrise perch, is a species of marine ray-finned fish, a member of the family Anthiadidae. It is known from the Indian Ocean and western Pacific.
