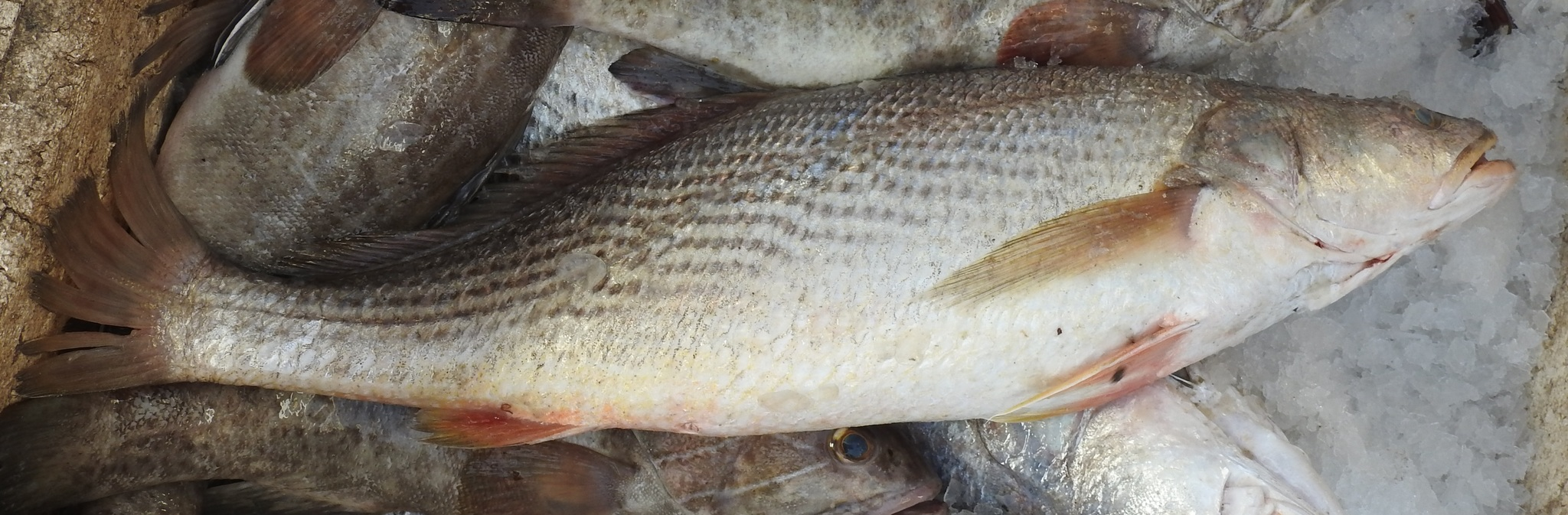

Conservation status
- Endangered (IUCN 3.1)

Scientific classification
- Kingdom: Animalia
- Phylum: Chordata
- Class: Actinopterygii
- Division: Teleostei
- Order: Acanthuriformes
- Family: Sciaenidae
- Genus: Pseudotolithus
- Species: P. senegalensis

Binomial name
- Pseudotolithus senegalensis (Valenciennes, 1833)

Synonyms
- Otolithus senegalensis Valenciennes, 1833; Sciaena senegalensis (Valenciennes, 1833); Sciaena dux Bowdich, 1825; Pseudotolithus macrognathus Bleeker, 1863; Otolithus macrognathus (Bleeker, 1863)

= Pseudotolithus senegalensis =

Species of fish

Pseudotolithus senegalensis, the cassava drum, is a large fish found on the coast of West Africa. It can grow up to a maximum length of 114 cm with a common length of about 50 cm for adults. It is known as cassava croaker or croaker in some parts of West Africa.

The main diet are prawns and epibenthic crustaceans.

== Local names ==
Other names
Language/region	Name
Ijaw	Gbu/n
Yoruba/Ilaje	Apo
Nigerian English	Croaker
Ga/Fante	Ekan
Abidjan	L'ombrine
Lebou	Nguku
Wolof	Law
Temne	Laydy

== Description ==
Pseudotolithus senegalensis is congeneric to P. typhus, it has a greyish brown color above that becomes paler beneath. Head has lateral eyes, a lower jaw that projects slightly above the upper jaw and large a mouth. It has 11 spines in its dorsal fin and 2 spines in the anal fin. Allometric growth from larva to adult especially with the head and some fins.

== Distribution ==
Pseudotolithus senegalensis is found in the Eastern Atlantic along the West African coast. It occurs over muddy waters in open shelf. Its northern boundary reaches Morocco and southern boundary is along the Angolan coast. Prefers temperature water to be warmer that 16 °C.
