= Pygmy sea bass =

Conservation status
- Least Concern (IUCN 3.1)

Scientific classification
- Kingdom: Animalia
- Phylum: Chordata
- Class: Actinopterygii
- Order: Perciformes
- Family: Serranidae
- Genus: Serraniculus; Ginsburg, 1952
- Species: S. pumilio

Binomial name
- Serraniculus pumilio Ginsburg, 1952

Species of fish

The pygmy sea bass (Serraniculus pumilio) is a species of marine ray-finned fish, it is the only member of the monotypic genus Serraniculus which is classified under the subfamily Serraninae, one of three subfamilies in the family Serranidae, which also includes the anthias and groupers. It is found in the western Atlantic Ocean and the northern Gulf of Mexico from South Carolina south to the northern coasts of South America but is absent from the Bahamas and the West Indies. It lives among sea grass growing onnsandy or shell bottoms beds down to depths of 45 metres (148 ft) and feeds on small benthic crustaceans. It is a synchronous hermaphrodite. This species attains a maximum total length of 7.5 centimetres (3.0 in).
