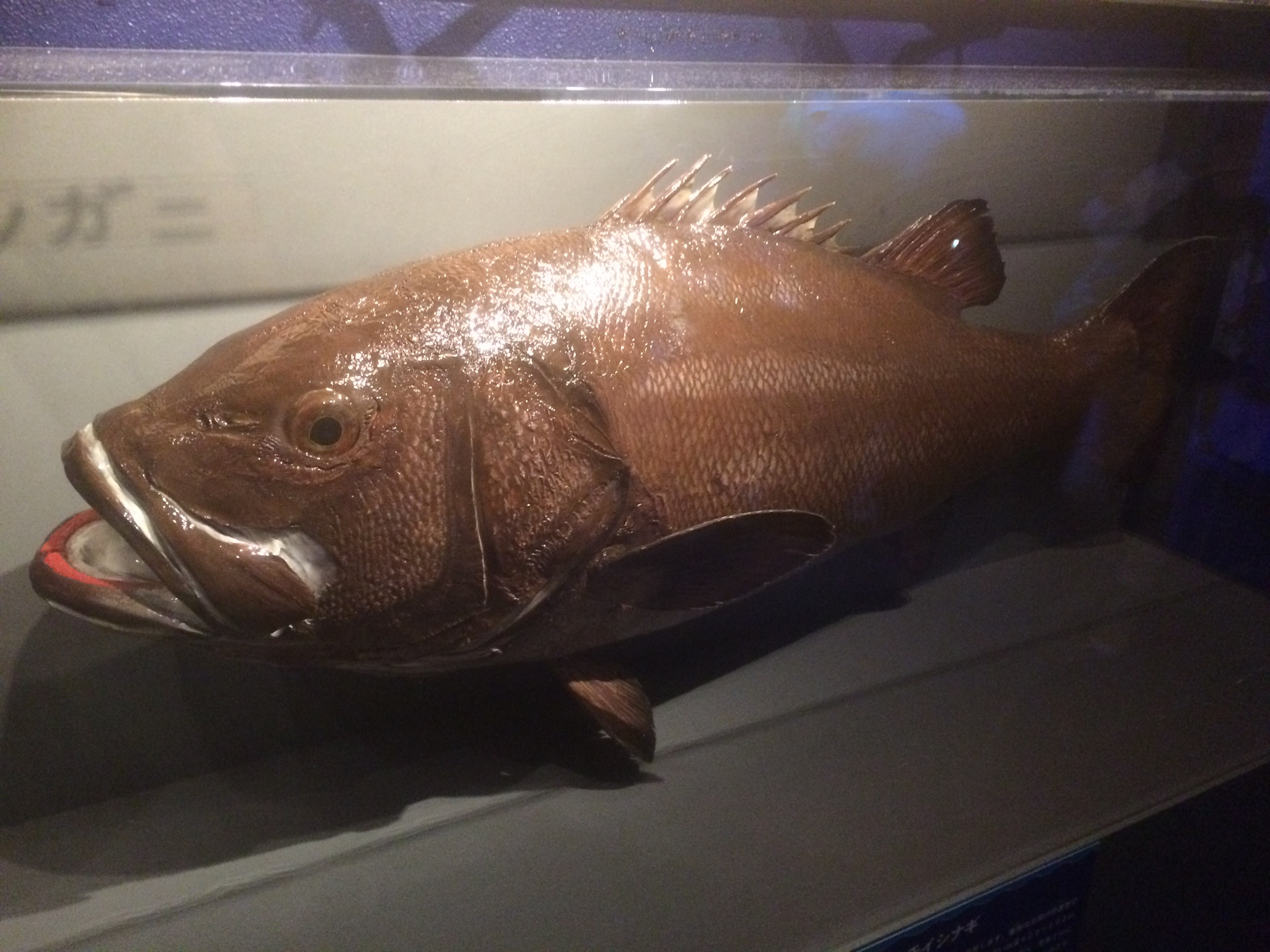

Scientific classification
- Kingdom: Animalia
- Phylum: Chordata
- Class: Actinopterygii
- Order: Acropomatiformes
- Family: Stereolepididae
- Genus: Stereolepis
- Species: S. doederleini

Binomial name
- Stereolepis doederleini Lindberg & Krasyukova, 1969

= Stereolepis doederleini =

Species of ray-finned fish

Stereolepis doedereini, the striped jewfish, is a marine ray-finned fish in the family Stereolepididae. It is found in the northwestern Pacific Ocean off Japan, Korea and the Far East of Russia. The adults can grow to a maximum total length of 210 centimetres (6.9 ft) and a maximum weight of 84 kilograms (185 lb).
