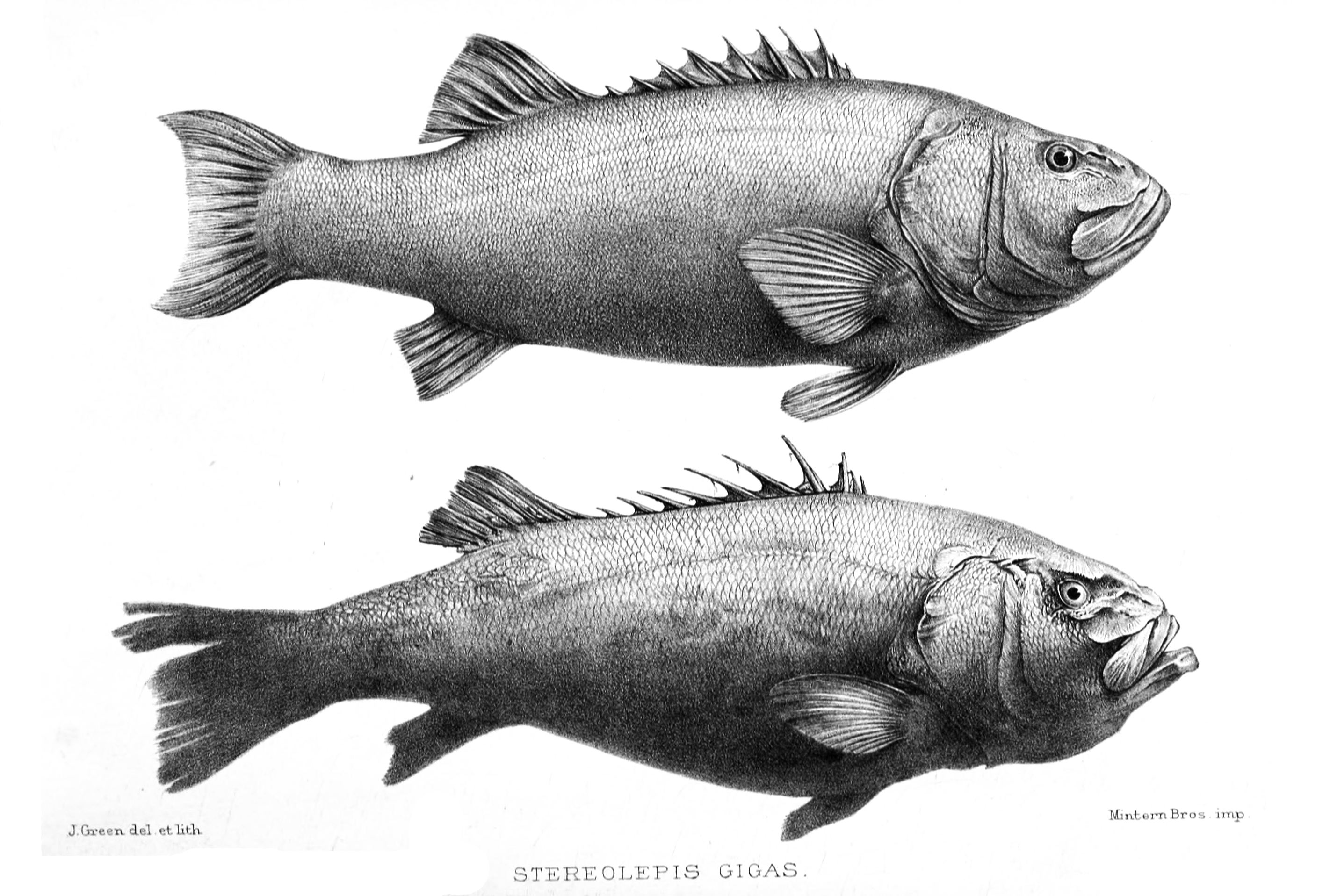
- Stereolepis gigas

Scientific classification
- Kingdom: Animalia
- Phylum: Chordata
- Class: Actinopterygii
- Order: Acropomatiformes
- Family: Stereolepididae; Smith et al., 2022
- Genus: Stereolepis; Ayres, 1859

Type species
- Stereolepis gigas Ayres, 1859

Synonyms
- Megaperca Hilgendorf, 1878

= Stereolepis =

Genus of ray-finned fishes

Stereolepis is a genus of marine ray-finned fish native to the Pacific Ocean. It is the only valid genus in the family Stereolepididae in the order Acropomatiformes.

== Species ==
The following two species are classified in the genus Stereolepis:

- Stereolepis doederleini Lindberg & Krasyukova, 1969 (Striped jewfish)
- Stereolepis gigas Ayres, 1859 (Giant sea bass)

A single fossil species, †Stereolepis arcanum Přikryl, Lin, Hsu & Lee, 2024 is known from the Early Pliocene of Taiwan.
