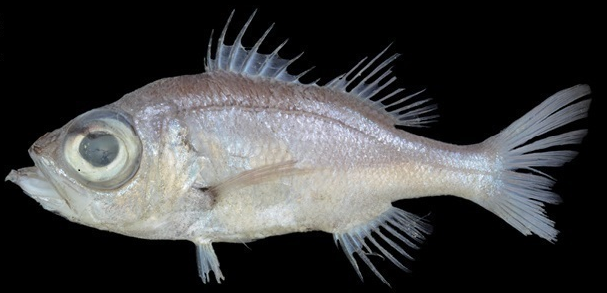

Scientific classification
- Kingdom: Animalia
- Phylum: Chordata
- Class: Actinopterygii
- Order: Acropomatiformes
- Family: Malakichthyidae
- Genus: Malakichthys
- Species: M. griseus

Binomial name
- Malakichthys griseus Döderlein, 1883

= Malakichthys griseus =

Species of ray-finned fish

Malakichthys griseus is a species of ray-finned fish in the family Malakichthyidae.
