= Spikey bass =

Scientific classification
- Kingdom: Animalia
- Phylum: Chordata
- Class: Actinopterygii
- Order: Carangiformes
- Suborder: Centropomoidei
- Family: Latidae
- Genus: Hypopterus; T. N. Gill, 1861
- Species: H. macropterus

Binomial name
- Hypopterus macropterus (Günther, 1859)

Synonyms
- Psammoperca macroptera Günther, 1859

Species of ray-finned fish

The spikey bass (Hypopterus macropterus) is a species of ray-finned fish in the family Latidae, the lates perches. It is endemic to coastal waters off Western Australia, where it inhabits areas with soft substrates. It is the only species in the monotypic genus Hypopterus.

== Description ==
The spikey bass is an olive brown bass-like fish fading pale silvery below, each scale is marked with a dark oval spot and there are eight indistinct vertical bands along the head and body. This species has a deeper body than other species in the Latidae. It grows to a standard length of 13.8 cm (5.4 in).

== Distribution and habitat ==
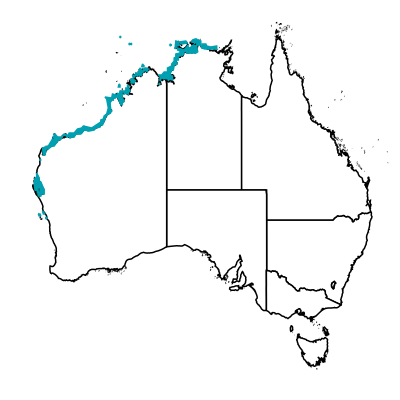
Distribution map.

The spikey bass is endemic to the eastern Indian Ocean off the coast of northwestern Australia. It prefers demersal and temperate waters.

== Etymology and taxonomy ==
The spikey bass’s generic name Hypopterus derives from the Greek hypo (under) and pteron (wing or fin).This species was first formally described as Psammoperca macroptera in 1859 by the German born British zoologist Albert Günther (1830-1914), with the type locality given as "Victora", meaning Port Essington in the Northern Territory but is actually thought to be Shark Bay in Western Australia. Theodore Nicholas Gill described the monospecific genus Hypopterus for this Australian endemic taxon in 1861.
