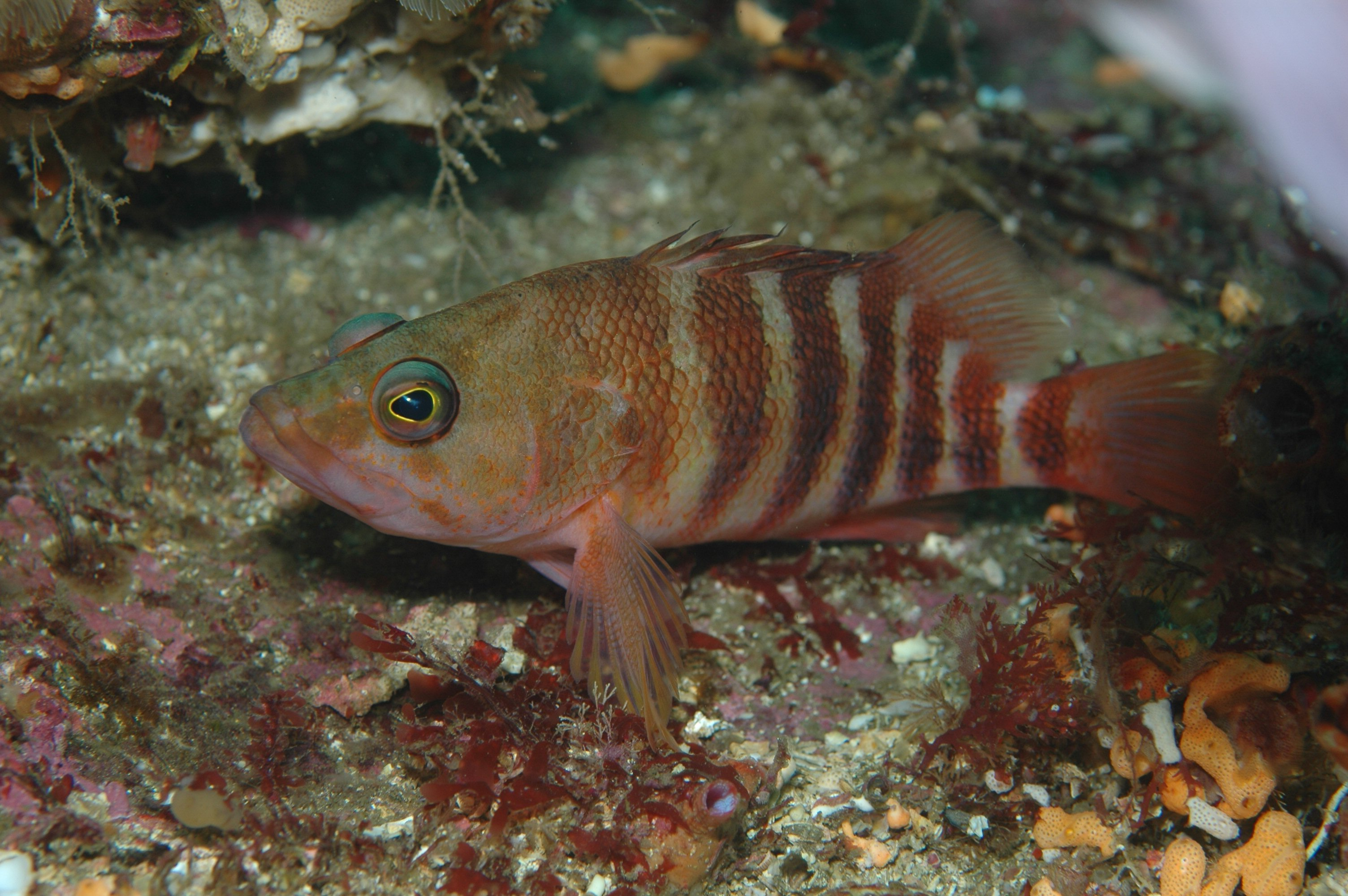

Scientific classification
- Domain: Eukaryota
- Kingdom: Animalia
- Phylum: Chordata
- Class: Actinopterygii
- Order: Perciformes
- Family: Anthiadidae
- Genus: Hypoplectrodes
- Species: H. huntii

Binomial name
- Hypoplectrodes huntii (Hector, 1875)

Synonyms
- Plectropoma huntii Hector, 1875; Ellerkeldia huntii (Hector, 1875)

= Redbanded perch =

Species of ray-finned fish

The redbanded perch (Hypoplectrodes huntii) is an anthia of the genus Hypoplectrodes, found in south eastern Australia, and the North Island and northern South Island of New Zealand, at depths between 5 and 100 m, its length is between 10 and 20 cm. The diet of the redbanded perch depends on the local and seasonal variations in the environment. This may effect its foraging behavior, however they have been observed to prey on small fish and crabs. This species was first formally described as Plectropoma huntii in 1875 with the type locality given as the Chatham Islands. The specific name honours F. Hunt who presented the type specimen to James Hector.
