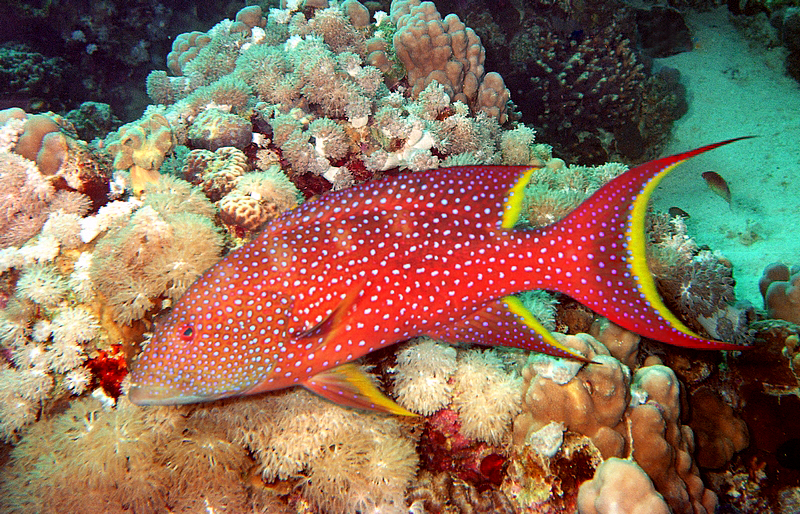

Conservation status
- Least Concern (IUCN 3.1)

Scientific classification
- Kingdom: Animalia
- Phylum: Chordata
- Class: Actinopterygii
- Division: Teleostei
- Order: Perciformes
- Family: Epinephelidae
- Genus: Variola
- Species: V. louti

Binomial name
- Variola louti Forsskål, 1775

= Yellow-edged lyretail =

Species of fish

The yellow-edged lyretail (Variola louti) also known as the yellowedge coronation trout, fairy cod, lunar tail rock cod, lunartailed cod, lyre-tail cod or moontail seabass,, is a species of marine ray-finned fish, a grouper from the subfamily Epinephelinae which is part of the family Serranidae, which also includes the anthias and sea basses. It is found in the Indo-Pacific region and is more common than the congeneric white-edged lyretail.

== Taxonomy ==
The yellow-edged lyretail was first formally described as Perca louti by the Swedish naturalist Peter Forsskål (1732-1763) with the type locality given as Jeddah, now in Saudi Arabia, and Al Luḩayyah in Yemen. William Swainson created the genus Variola as a subgenus of Serranus with Variola longipinnis as the type species by monotypy. V longipinnis is a synonym of Serranus louti of Eduard Rüppell, following Forsskål.

== Distribution ==
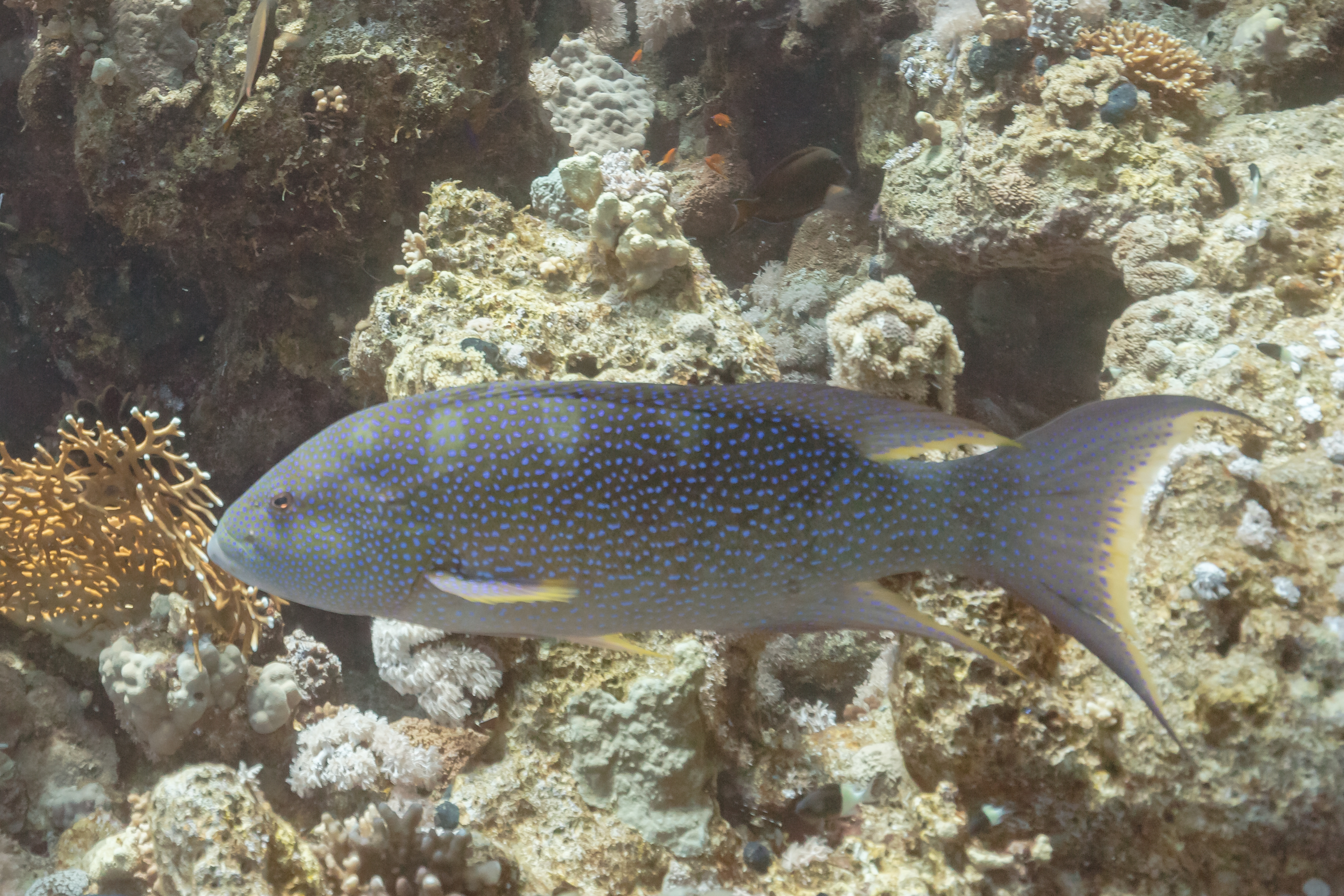
In the Red Sea

The yellow-edged lyretail has an Indo-Pacific distribution and is found from the east coast of Africa where it occurs from Durban in South Africa to the Red Sea through the tropical Indian Ocean east into the Pacific Ocean where it occurs as far north as southern Japan, south to Australia and east to the Pitcairn Islands. In Australia it is found from Shark Bay in Western Australia to Ashmore Reef in the Timor Sea and from Cape York in Queensland south to Sydney in New South Wales Frederick Reefs and Coringa-Herald National Nature Reserve in the Coral Sea, as well as at Middleton and Elizabeth Reefs and Lord Howe Island in the Tasman Sea.

Recently it has been recorded twice (2018, 2019) in the eastern Mediterranean Sea off Cyprus, due either to aquarium release or introduction from the Red Sea through the Suez Canal.

== Habitat and biology ==
The yellow-edged lyretail is normally observed in clear-water areas at depths greater than 15 metres (49 ft) but less than 350 metres (1,150 ft), showing a preference for islands and offshore reefs over continental shores. It feeds mostly on fishes, as well as on crabs, shrimps and stomatopods. The females attain sexual maturity at a standard length of 33 centimetres (13 in). They have been recorded forming spawning aggregations off Aceh in Sumatra. This species is yet to be confirmed as a protogynous hermaphrodite. Spawning takes place between December and February.

== Description ==
In the Maldives

This species attains a maximum recorded total length of 83 centimetres (33 in), although 75 centimetres (30 in) is a more normal length, and a maximum weight of 12 kilograms (26 lb).

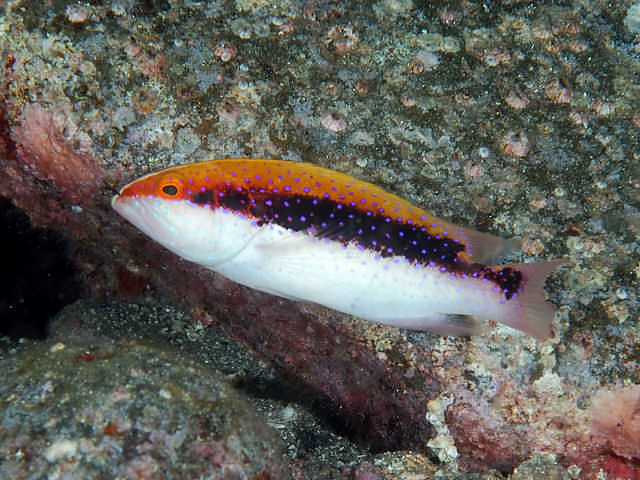
Juvenile, in Japan

The yellow-edged lyretail has an oblong-shaped body on which the length of the head is longer than the depth of the body, the standard length of its body is 2.8 to 3.3 times its depth. The preopercle is rounded with fine serrations along its edge with the lower edge being fleshy. There are three flat spines on the gill cover, which has a straight upper edge. The dorsal fin contains 9 spines and 13–14 soft rays while the anal fin contains 3 spines and 8 soft rays. The caudal fin is crescent-shaped with its upper and lower lobes extended and are around two times the length of the fin's middle rays. The overall colour of this grouper is reddish and it is covered in blue spots. The dorsal and anal fins have pointed posterior tips. They have a reddish colour on the upper body which frequently shades to orangish to white on the lower part of the body. They are marked with many small bluish or pinkish spots on the head, body and fins. The rear margins of the fins are yellow.

The juveniles appear to mimic goatfishes of the family Mullidae.

== Utilisation ==
The yellow-edged lyretail is a valuable food fish. However, there have been reports of ciguatera poisoning, and this has led to the fish being banned from sale in Mauritius, when above 1.5 kg. The danger of poisoning has also meant that it is uncommonly fished for or sold in Japan and some countries of south-east Asia. It is also found in the aquarium and live food fish trades.

== Gallery ==
In South Africa

In South Africa

In the Red Sea

In Japan

In Japan
