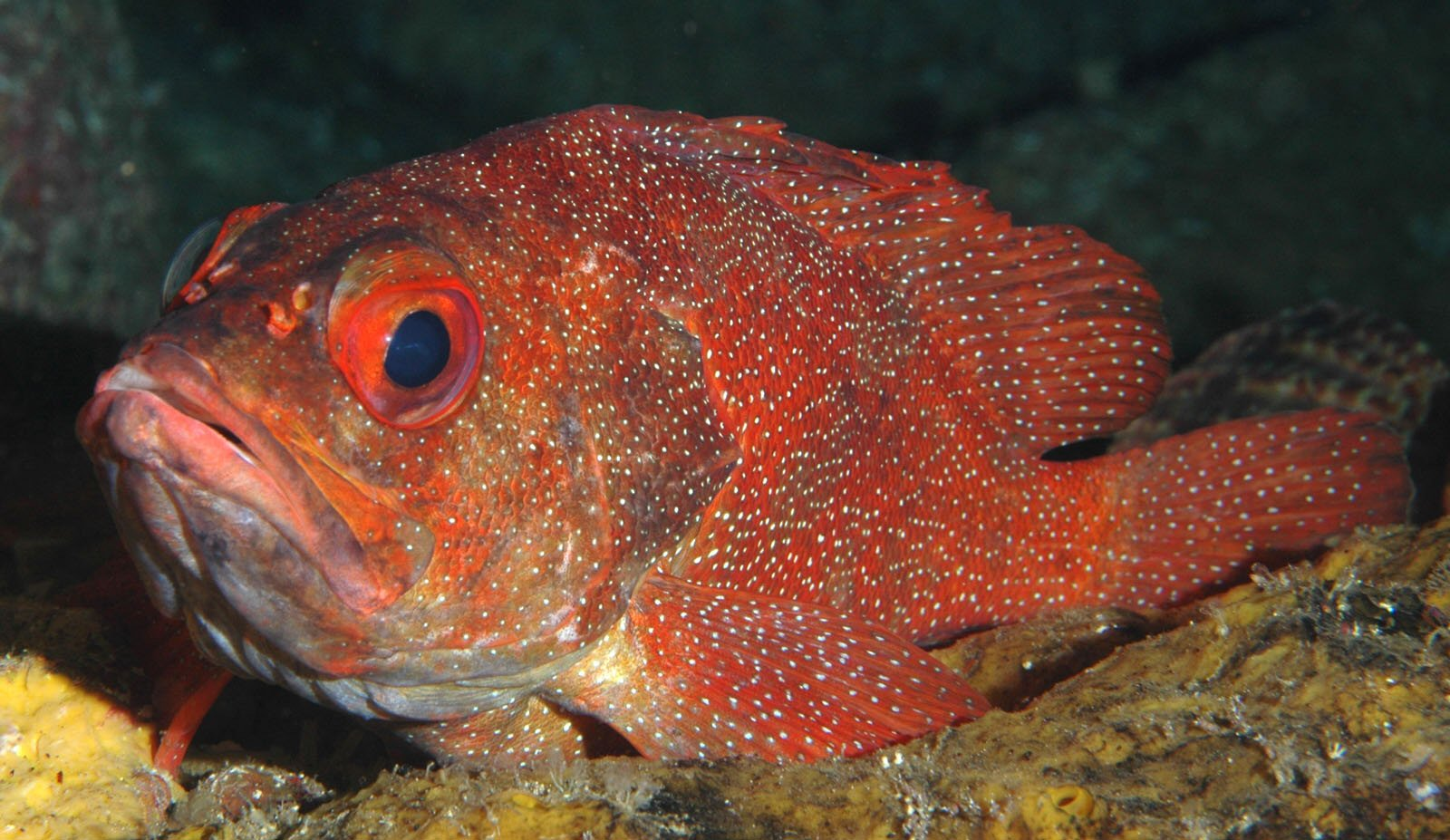

Conservation status
- Least Concern (IUCN 3.1)

Scientific classification
- Kingdom: Animalia
- Phylum: Chordata
- Class: Actinopterygii
- Order: Perciformes
- Suborder: Percoidei
- Family: Anthiadidae
- Genus: Trachypoma; Günther, 1859
- Species: T. macracanthus

Binomial name
- Trachypoma macracanthus Günther, 1859

= Toadstool groper =

Species of ray-finned fish

The toadstool groper (Trachypoma macracanthus), also known as the Pacific rockcod, Pacific perch, Strawberry cod and whitespotted sea bass is a ray-finned fish of the family Anthiadidae which is found in the southern Pacific Ocean. Its length is between 20 and 40 cm.

== Description ==
The toadstool groper is bright orange or red in colour with an irregular pattern of small white spots covering its body and the fins. It has large eyes which are set high on head. The lower border of the preopercular bone has three upward curving spines. The dorsal fin 12 spines while the anal fin contains 6 soft rays. This species grows to around 40 centimetres (16 in) in length. Although other authorities give it a maximum length of 22 centimetres (8.7 in).

== Distribution ==
The toadstool groper has been recorded from New Zealand and the Kermadec Islands, Easter Island, and the Desventuradas Islands of Chile. Around Australia it is found around southwestern and southeastern Australia, Lord Howe Island, Norfolk Island and the Elizabeth and Middleton Reefs.

== Habitat and biology ==
The toadstool groper is found in rocky reefs, as well as in the coral sand areas of lagoons at depths of 10 to 50 metres (33 to 164 ft). It frequently hides in caves and underneath overhangs and it feeds on a variety of benthic invertebrates and smaller fishes. They are nocturnal hunters and one of their favourite prey items is "crayfish", leaving their shelters at night to hunt these crustaceans.

== Species description ==
The toadstool groper was first formally described by the German born British ichthyologist Albert Günther in 1859 with the type locality given as Norfolk Island.
