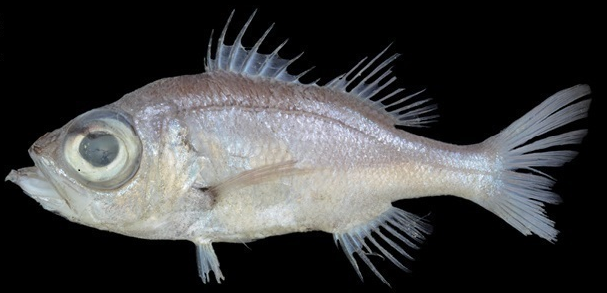
- Malakichthys griseus

Scientific classification
- Kingdom: Animalia
- Phylum: Chordata
- Class: Actinopterygii
- Order: Acropomatiformes
- Family: Malakichthyidae
- Genus: Malakichthys; Döderlein, 1883

Type species
- Malakichthys griseus Döderlein, 1883

Synonyms
- Satsuma Smith & Pope, 1906

= Malakichthys =

Genus of ray-finned fishes

Malakichthys is a genus of ray-finned fish in the family Malakichthyidae. They are native to the Indian Ocean and the western Pacific Ocean.

Fish of this genus are characterized by their small villiform teeth, 3 anal fin spines, 10 dorsal fin spines, and anus located near the anal fin origin.

== Species ==
There are currently seven recognized species in this genus:

- Malakichthys barbatus Yamanoue & Yoseda, 2001
- Malakichthys elegans Matsubara & Yamaguti, 1943 – splendid seabass
- Malakichthys griseus Döderlein (de), 1883 – silvergray seabass
- Malakichthys levis Yamanoue & Matsuura, 2002 – smooth seabass
- Malakichthys mochizuki Yamanoue & Matsuura, 2002 – Mochizuki's seabass
- Malakichthys similis Yamanoue & Matsuura, 2004
- Malakichthys wakiyae D. S. Jordan & C. L. Hubbs, 1925
