= Giant sea bass =

- In California

Conservation status
- Critically Endangered (IUCN 3.1)

Scientific classification
- Kingdom: Animalia
- Phylum: Chordata
- Class: Actinopterygii
- Division: Teleostei
- Order: Acropomatiformes
- Family: Stereolepididae
- Genus: Stereolepis
- Species: S. gigas

Binomial name
- Stereolepis gigas Ayres, 1859

Synonyms
- Stereolepis californicus Gill, 1863; Megaperca ischinagi Hilgendorf, 1878

Species of fish

The giant sea bass (Stereolepis gigas) is a fish native to the North Pacific Ocean. Although commonly referred to as a giant sea bass, black sea bass or giant black sea bass, it is unrelated to sea basses in the family Serranidae.

== Distribution and habitat ==
In the eastern North Pacific, its range is from Humboldt Bay, California, to the Gulf of California, Mexico, most common from Point Conception southward. In the northwestern Pacific it occurs around Japan.

It usually stays near kelp forests, drop-offs, or rocky bottoms and sand or mudflats. Juvenile giant sea bass can be found at depths around 69 feet (21 m), with adults of the species found at depths below 66 feet (20 m).

== Description ==
In California

There are published reports of giant sea bass exceeding 2.1 metres (7 ft) in length. A 2014 study by Hawk and Allen found specimens up to 2.003 metres (6 ft 6.9 in) long. As growth in the giant sea bass slows with increasing age, the study also reported that the Von Bertalanffy function predicts a maximum length of 2.0622 metres (6 ft 9.19 in) at an indefinite age. Reports of giant sea bass weighing as much as 600 pounds (270 kg) cannot be verified. A specimen weighing 435 pounds (197 kg) was reported in 1971. Aside from its tremendous size, the giant sea bass is also known for its lengthy lifespan. They mature around the age of 11 or 12, around the weight of 50 pounds (23 kg). While some unverifiable reports have claimed that giant sea bass live to 90 or 100 years of age, Hawk and Allen report that while they found several specimens that were very close to the expected maximum size of the fish, none were older than 76 years of age.

Juvenile

Juveniles of the species are brightly colored in red or orange; they become gray or brown as they mature.

== Diet ==
Within kelp forests giant sea bass are the apex predator. Giant sea bass feed on crustaceans, as well as a wide variety of fish. For populations off the coast of California, anchovies and croaker are prominent food sources. Mackerel, sheephead, whitefish, sand bass, and several types of crab also make up the sea bass's diet. Despite their great size and bulky appearance, giant sea bass have been known to move extremely quickly, outstripping bonito.

== History and conservation ==
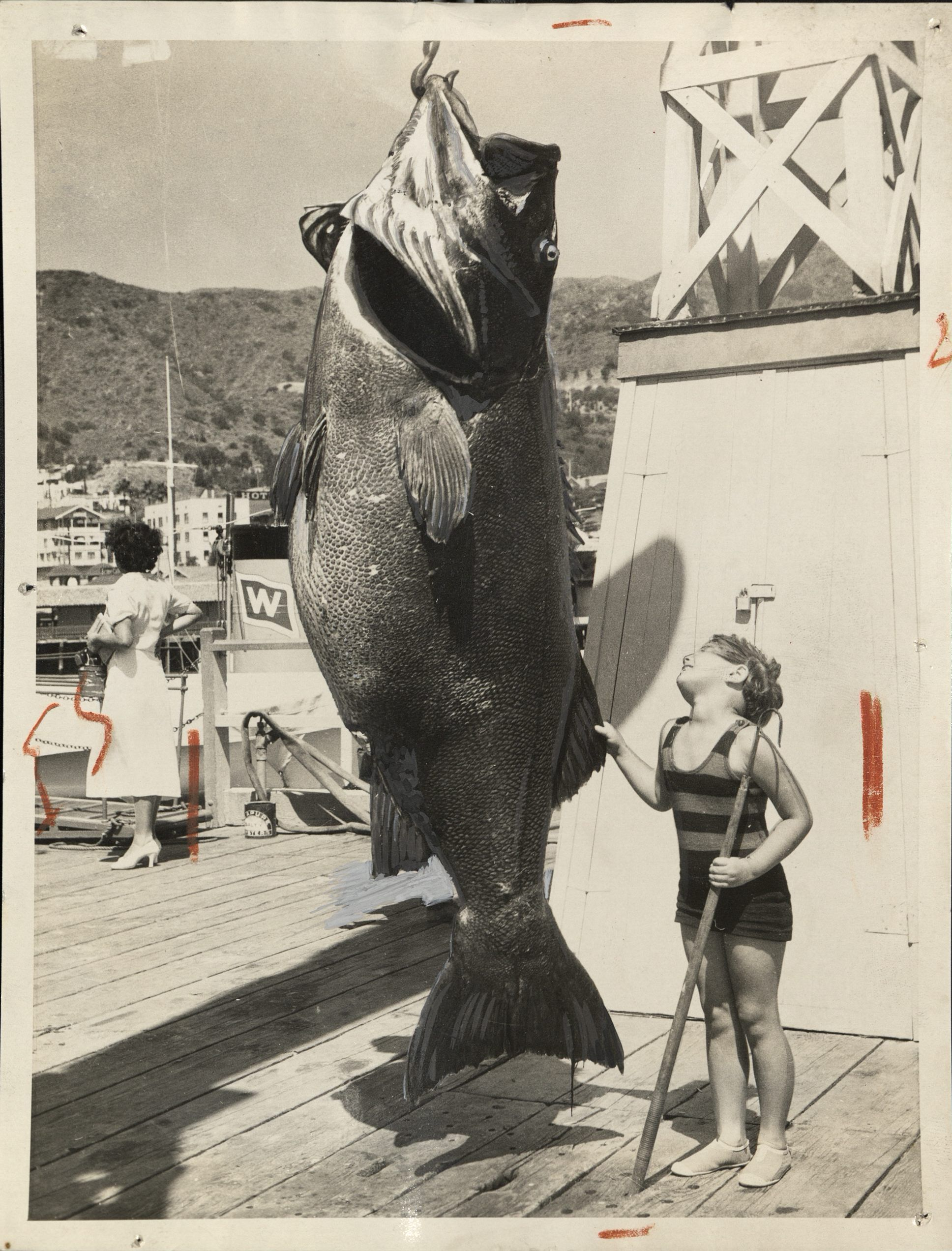
A particularly large giant sea bass

Recreational fishing of the giant sea bass began in the late 19th century. Caught off the Central and Southern California coasts in the 20th century, the peak catch of the giant sea bass was in 1932. Once relatively common in Southern California waters, the fish was facing the threat of local extinction there by the 1980s.

Giant sea bass were also a popular "big game" quarry for both freediving and scuba spearfishermen. In the 1970s, spearfishing for this species was made illegal by the California Department of Fish and Game. One notable incident precipitated an abrupt change in the law. Several freedivers had taken seven fish at Santa Cruz Island. They then sold the catch illegally to a fish market in San Pedro. Fish and Game wardens discovered that the fish had been speared by observing the holes and slip tips left behind in their bodies.

By the late 1970s, biologists with the California Department of Fish and Game recognized that the local population of giant sea bass had declined. Actions were taken, resulting in protection from commercial and sport fishing that went into effect in 1982. In 1996, the species was listed as critically endangered by the IUCN. As of 2004, it is suggested that the population size of giant sea bass in California may be increasing as it is under protection; however, there is no hard data to support it. In 2016, the first successful captive breeding of the species occurred at the Aquarium of the Pacific. The total breeding population in California in 2018 is estimated to be around 500 individuals, of which 40 to 50 return to spawn around Catalina Island each year.

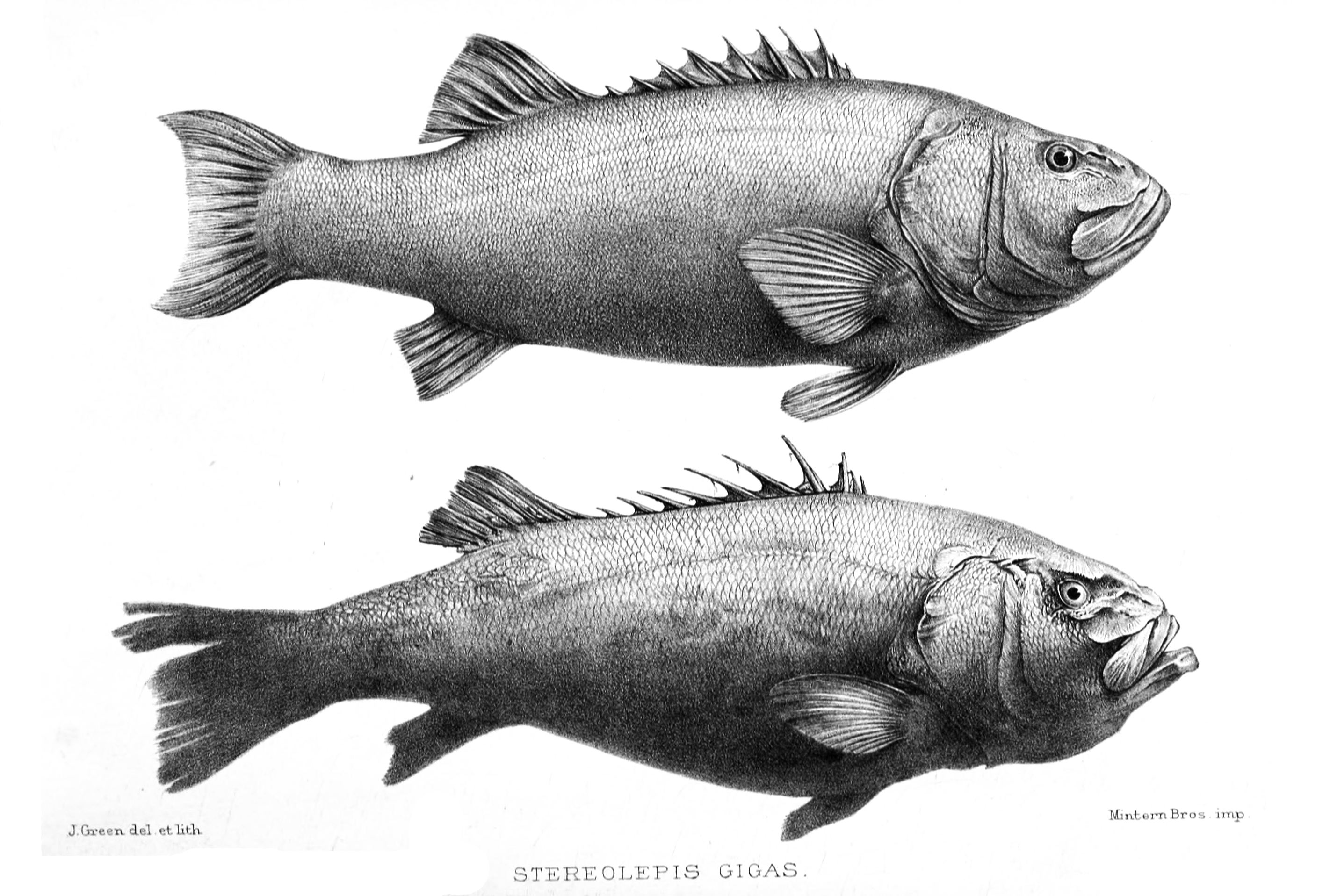
1897 illustrations of a Californian specimen (top) and the type of "Megaperca ischinagi" from Japan (bottom)

Giant sea bass remain understudied in the Mexican portion of its range, although efforts are underway to monitor the population size, genetic connectivity, and fishing pressure along the Pacific coast of the Baja peninsula. More than half of the range of the giant sea bass are within Mexican waters. In Mexico, the giant sea bass is called mero gigante. The peak catch of giant sea bass in Mexican waters occurred in 1932, when the catch was over 800,000 pounds (360,000 kg). Prior to 1964, commercial catches of giant sea bass in Mexican waters were above 200,000 pounds (91,000 kg). In 1981, United States commercial fishermen were initially allowed to catch up to 1,000 pounds (450 kg) of giant sea bass per trip into Mexican waters, and no more than 3,000 pounds (1,400 kg) per year; in 1988 the regulation changed to only allow a single giant sea bass to be taken per trip if taken incidentally. Within those waters for over half a century the average catch of giant sea bass by Mexican fishermen has been 55 tonnes (55,000 kg).

== Sources ==
- Hawk, Holly A.; Allen, Larry G. (December 2014). "Age and Growth of the Giant Sea Bass, Sterolepsis gigas" (PDF). California Cooperative Oceanic Fisheries Investigations Report. 55 (1): 128–134.
