= Angola croaker =

Conservation status
- Least Concern (IUCN 3.1)

Scientific classification
- Kingdom: Animalia
- Phylum: Chordata
- Class: Actinopterygii
- Order: Acanthuriformes
- Family: Sciaenidae
- Genus: Miracorvina; Trewavas, 1962
- Species: M. angolensis

Binomial name
- Miracorvina angolensis (Norman, 1935)

Synonyms
- Sciaena angolensis Norman, 1935; Pseudosciaena angolensis (Norman, 1935)

Species of ray-finned fish

The Angola croaker (Miracorvina angolensis) is a species of marine ray-finned fish belonging to the family Sciaenidae, the drums and croakers. This is the only species in the monospecific genus Miracorvina. This fish is found in the eastern Atlantic Ocean from the Gulf of Guinea to southern Angola where it is found at depths between 50 and 300 m (160 and 980 ft) over sand and mud substrates in waters on the continental shelf and slope, staying deeper than the thermocline. It is a predator of nektonic fishes and crustaceans. This species has a maximum published total length of 120 cm (47 in) but 60 cm (24 in) is more typical. It is thought to be a rare species and is not targeted by fisheries.
