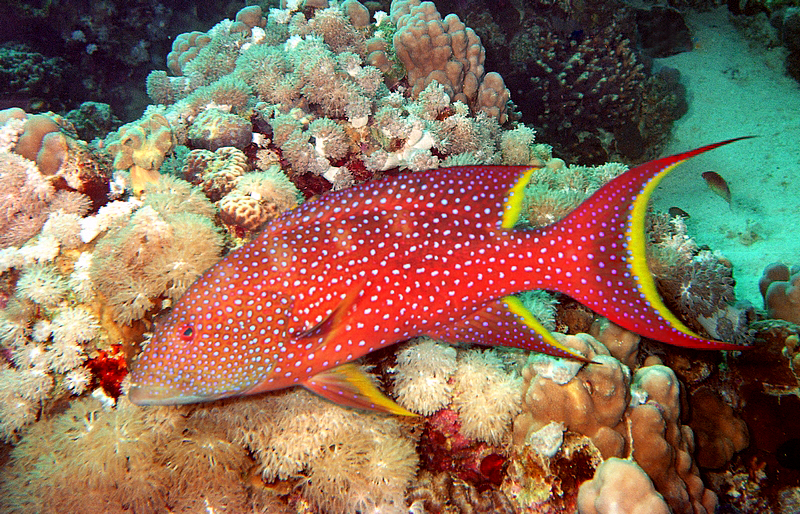
- Yellow-edged lyretail (V. louti)
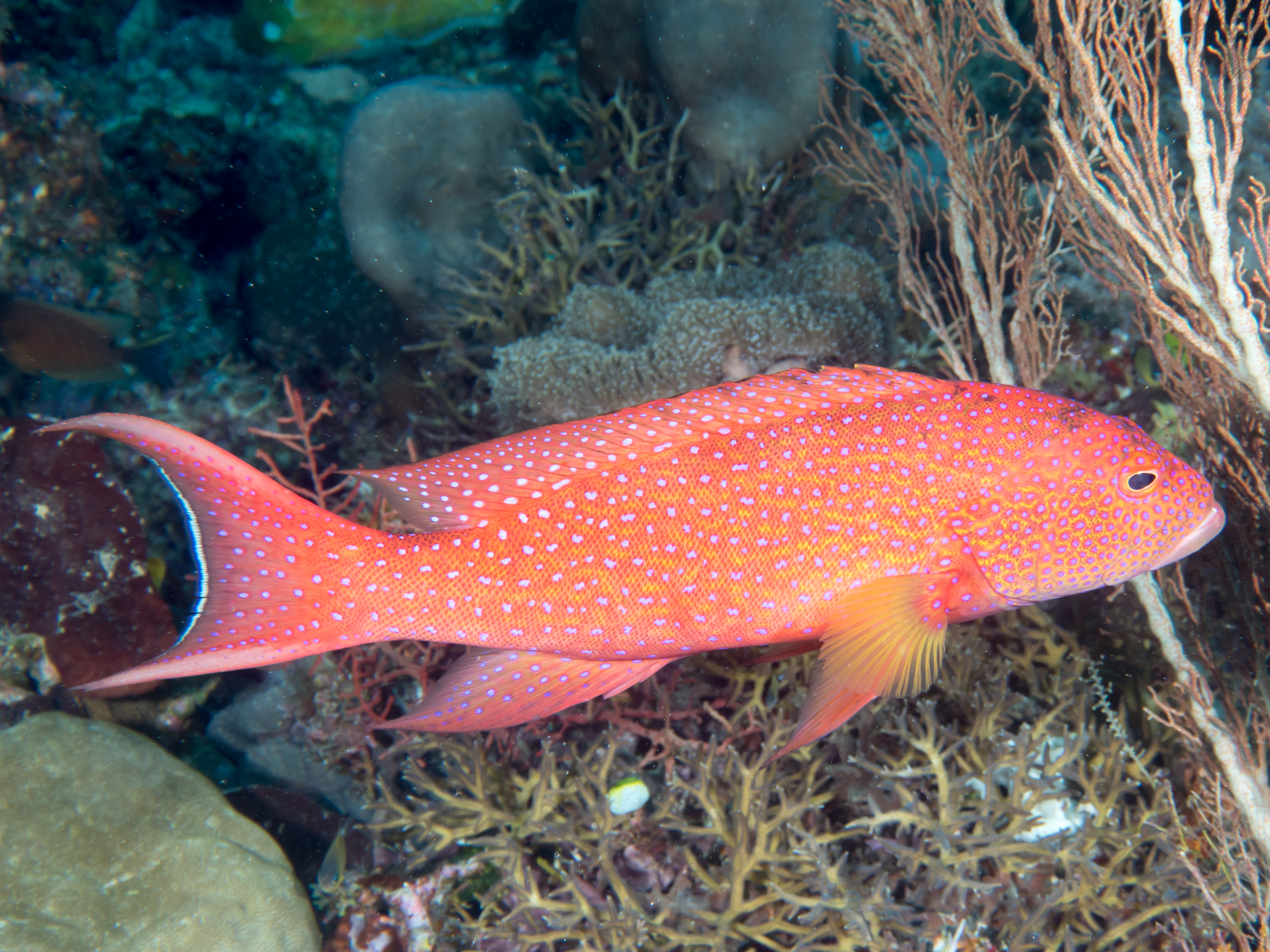
- White-edged lyretail (V. albimarginata)

Scientific classification
- Kingdom: Animalia
- Phylum: Chordata
- Class: Actinopterygii
- Division: Teleostei
- Order: Perciformes
- Family: Epinephelidae
- Genus: Variola; Swainson, 1839

Type species
- Variola longipinna Swainson, 1839

Synonyms
- Pseudoserranus Klunzinger, 1870

= Variola (fish) =

Genus of fishes

Variola, the lyretails, is a genus of marine ray-finned fish, groupers from the subfamily Epinephelinae, part of the family Serranidae, which also includes the anthias and sea basses. They are found in the tropical Indo-Pacific, from the east coast of Africa across the Indian Ocean to the islands of the central Pacific. One species, V. louti, is also present in the Red Sea.

== Characteristics ==
The lyretails have an oblong shaped body which has a depth that is less than the length of the head and which has a standard length that is 2.8 to 3.2 times its depth. They have a slightly convex dorsal profile of the head and a snout which is longer than the diameter of the eye. Both species have a rounded preopercle with a finely serrated margin and a fleshy lower margin. There are three flat spines on the gill cover which has a straight upper margin. Both the upper and lower jaws have a pair of large canine teeth at the front and there are also 1 to 3 large canines in the middle of the lower jaw, and there are teeth on the roof of the mouth as well. The dorsal fin contains 9 spines and 13 to 15 soft rays and it has its origin above the posterior end of the gill cover. The membranes between the spines of the dorsal fin are not or are only slightly incised. The anal fin has 3 separated spines and 8 soft rays. The caudal fin is crescent shaped with elongated lobes.

== Habitat and biology ==
Variola species occur at depths of 4 to 200 metres (13 to 656 ft) over coral reefs where they are normally observed seen swimming some distance above the reef and they appear to prefer areas with clear water such as islands and offshore reefs. They are largely piscivorous.

== Species ==
The two known species are:

Adult	Juvenile	Species	Common name
		Variola louti (Forsskål, 1775)	yellow-edged lyretail
		Variola albimarginata Baissac, 1952	white-edged lyretail
