= Pentheroscion =

Conservation status
- Near Threatened (IUCN 3.1)

Scientific classification
- Kingdom: Animalia
- Phylum: Chordata
- Class: Actinopterygii
- Order: Acanthuriformes
- Family: Sciaenidae
- Genus: Pentheroscion; Trewavas, 1962
- Species: P. mbizi

Binomial name
- Pentheroscion mbizi (Poll, 1950)

Synonyms
- Sciaena mbizi Poll, 1950; Pseudosciaena mbizi (Poll, 1950)

Genus of ray-finned fish

Pentheroscion is a monospecific genus of marine ray-finned fish belonging to the family Sciaenidae, the drums and croakers. Its only species is Pentheroscion mbizi, which the FAO refers to as the blackmouth croaker, from the eastern Atlantic Ocean off the western coast of Africa between Guinea in the north and Angola in the south.
