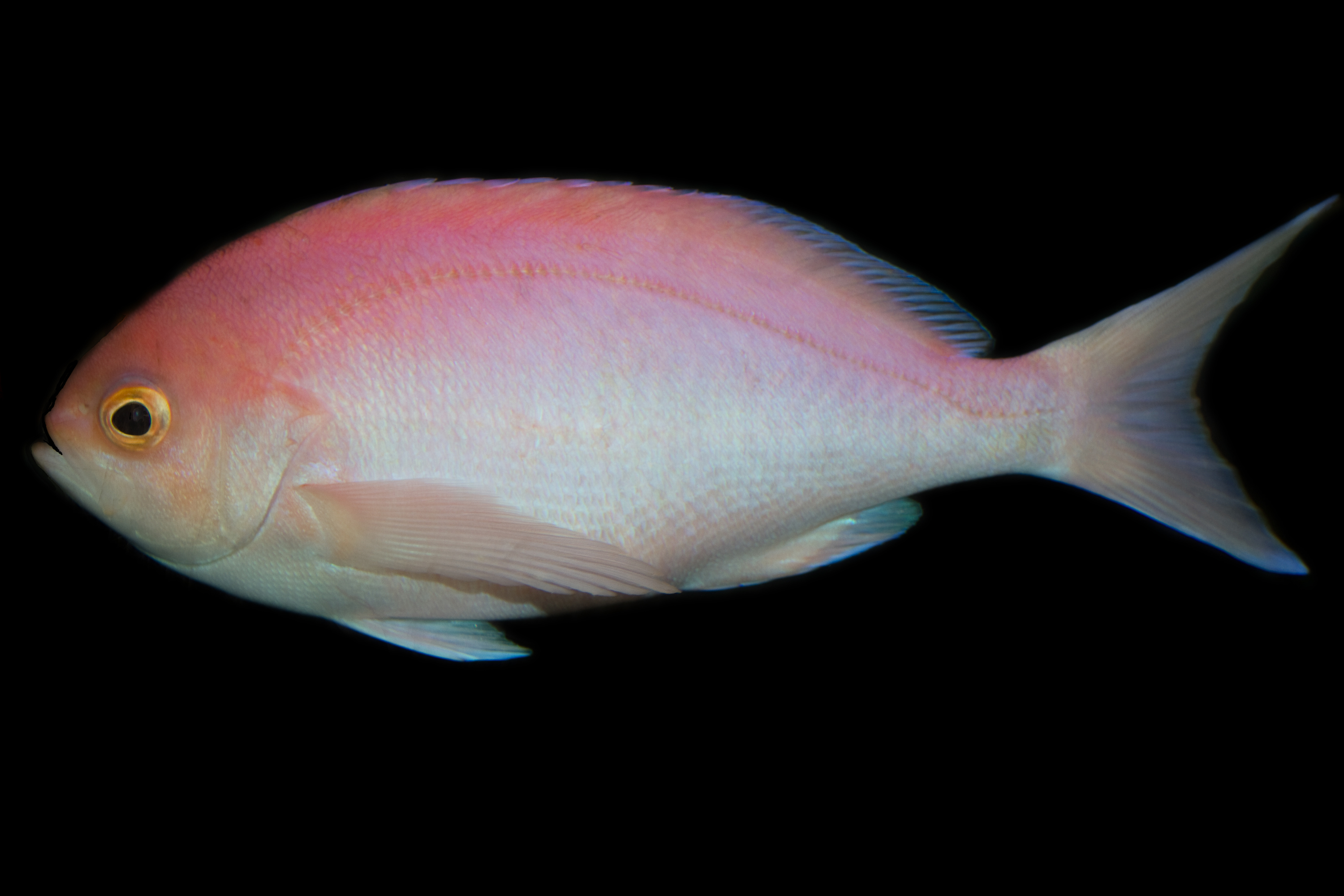

Conservation status
- Least Concern (IUCN 3.1)

Scientific classification
- Kingdom: Animalia
- Phylum: Chordata
- Class: Actinopterygii
- Order: Perciformes
- Family: Anthiadidae
- Genus: Caprodon
- Species: C. longimanus

Binomial name
- Caprodon longimanus (Günther, 1859)

Synonyms
- Anthias longimanus Günther, 1859; Scorpis fairchildi Hector, 1875; Neoanthias guntheri Castelnau, 1879

= Pink maomao =

Species of ray-finned fish

The pink maomao (Caprodon longimanus), also known as the longfin perch, is a species of marine ray-finned fish, a member of the family Anthiadidae. It is found in the southern Pacific and the southeastern Indian Ocean.

== Description ==
The pink maomao has long and pointed pectoral fins, longer than the head, a long based dorsal fin and a caudal fin which is slightly forked. The dorsal fin has 10 spines and 19-21 soft rays while the anal fin has 3 spines and 7-9 soft rays. In specimens from the eastern specific there are 58-65 scales in the lateral line while in specimens from the western Pacific there are 61-71 lateral line scales. The females are an overall mauvish pink colour while the males are a similar colour but may show blackish blotches on the back and upper flanks and on the dorsal fin and males also have yellowish dorsal, caudal, anal and pelvic fins. The maximum recorded fork length is 55 centimetres (22 in) but they are more commonly recorded at fork lengths of 28–30 centimetres (11–12 in) and they normally weigh around 1 kilogram (2.2 lb) but can reach 2 kilograms (4.4 lb).

== Distribution ==
The pink maomao is found in the southeastern Indian Ocean off Rottnest Island in Western Australia and in the south western Pacific Ocean off eastern Australia from Coffs Harbour to Bermagui in New South Wales, around Lord Howe Island and Norfolk Island in the Tasman Sea, the Kermadec Islands south to D'Urville Island and Kaikōura in New Zealand, especially in the north island. They also occur in the southeastern Pacific around Easter Island, the Juan Fernández Islands, the Nazca Ridge and the Isla Salas y Gómez. It has also been reported from the Hawaiian Islands.

== Habitat and biology ==
The pink maomao is found near inshore reefs and its habits are both benthopelagic and benthic. It feeds on zooplankton and small swimming organisms. It can also occur on the outer edge of the continental shelf, and around seamounts. Analysis of stomach contents of fish caught in the Juan Fernandez Islands of Chile showed that this species is opportunistic in its choice of prey, the commonest prey item found were salps of the genus Thalia but this study found that a total of 17 genera of crustaceans were consumed, as well as pteropods, chaetognaths and polychaetes. During the day pink maomao form schools, often mixed with silver trevally (Pseudocaranx georgianus), yellowtail horse mackerel (Trachurus novaezelandiae) and blue mackerel (Scomber australasicus), retreating to rocky areas to spend the night. This species is a protogynous hermaphrodite, they are hatched as females and may change sex to become male. Juvenile fish are only occasionally observed suggesting that this species breeds infrequently in low numbers.

== Taxonomy ==
The pink maomao was first formally described as Anthias longimanus in 1859 by the Germany-born British zoologist Albert Günther (1830-1914) with the type locality not being stated but thought to be Australia. Studies in New Zealand suggest that there are two species occurring there, one from the Kermadec Islands and the other from the North Island and the west Norfolk Ridge.

== Fisheries ==
The pink maomao has thick, white flesh which is excellent for eating and it is pursued by spearfishermen but is infrequently caught by line fishermen. Bag limits are in place in New Zealand.
