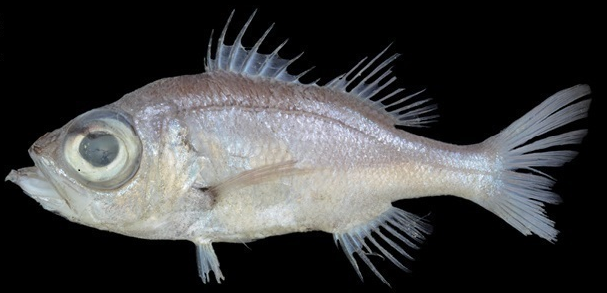
- Malakichthys griseus

Scientific classification
- Kingdom: Animalia
- Phylum: Chordata
- Class: Actinopterygii
- Order: Acropomatiformes
- Family: Malakichthyidae; Jordan & Richardson, 1910

Genera
- See text

= Malakichthyidae =

Family of ray-finned fishes

Malakichthyidae is a small family of ray-finned fishes, sometimes known as the temperate ocean-basses, in the order Acropomatiformes. Its members were formerly included in the lanternbelly family Acropomatidae.

== Genera ==
The following genera are included in the family:

- Hemilutjanus Bleeker, 1876
- Malakichthys Döderlein, 1883
- Verilus Poey, 1860
