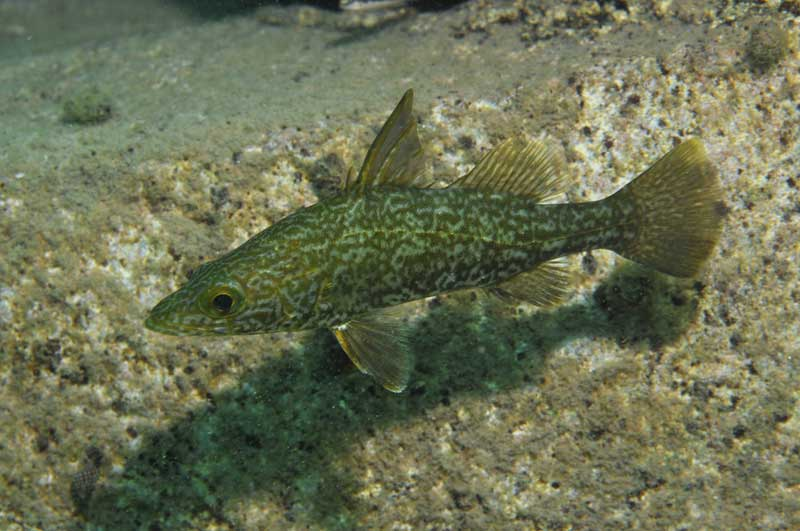
- Juvenile

Conservation status
- Endangered (IUCN 3.1)

Scientific classification
- Kingdom: Animalia
- Phylum: Chordata
- Class: Actinopterygii
- Order: Carangiformes
- Suborder: Centropomoidei
- Family: Latidae
- Genus: Lates
- Species: L. angustifrons

Binomial name
- Lates angustifrons Boulenger, 1906

= Tanganyika lates =

Species of ray-finned fish

The Tanganyika lates (Lates angustifrons)is a species of lates perch endemic to Lake Tanganyika. It is a widespread predator on other fishes. This species can reach a length of 200 centimetres (79 in) SL and the greatest recorded weight is 100 kilograms (220 lb). This species is important commercially and is also popular as a game fish. It is threatened by the pressures that these activities put upon the population.

Despite its common name, it is not the only lates in Tanganyika. The three other species in this lake are the bigeye lates (L. mariae), forktail lates (L. microlepis) and sleek lates (L. stappersii).
