= Katsurahama Aquarium =

Aquarium in Kōchi, Kōchi Prefecture

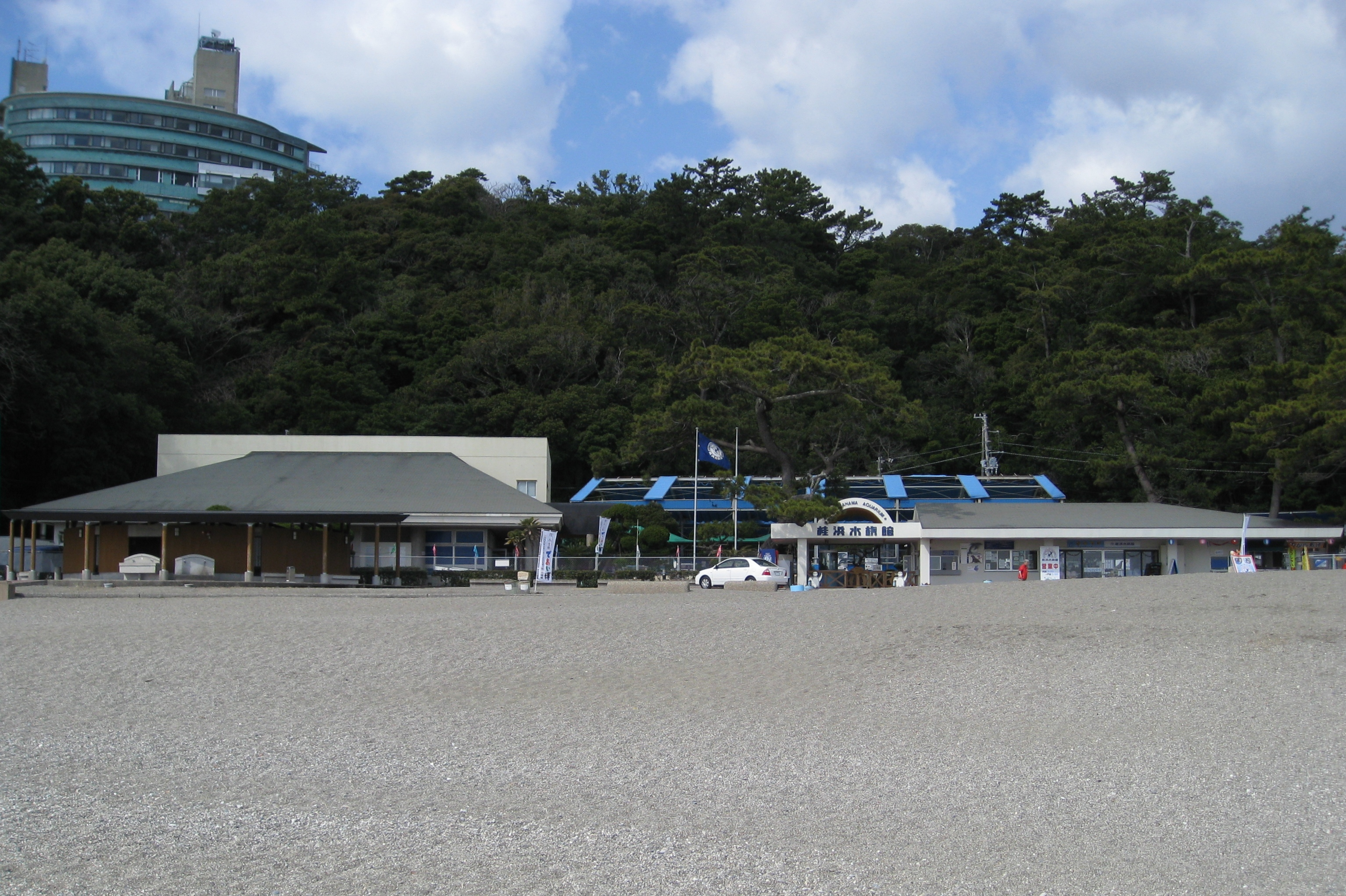
- Katsurahama Aquarium
- Interactive map of Katsurahama Aquarium
- 33.4969444°N 133.5736111°E
- Date opened: April 1, 1931
- Location: Kōchi, Kōchi, Japan
- No. of species: 200
- Memberships: JAZA
- Public transit: Tosaden Kōtsū
- Website: katurahama-aq.jp

Katsurahama Aquarium (桂浜水族館, Katsurahama suizokukan) is an aquarium located in Kōchi, Kōchi Prefecture on Katsurahama.

== History ==
The aquarium opened on April 1, 1931. It was closed temporarily during World War II, but reopened afterwards. In 1984, the aquarium was relocated to its present location.

== Exhibits ==
The aquarium's many exhibits include the following species:

- Tosakin (curly fantail goldfish)
- Japanese lates
- Capybaras

Before the COVID-19 pandemic, the aquarium was known for its popular sea lion shows. In June 2022, it was announced that scheduled animal shows would be cancelled due to animal welfare concerns. Instead, they would be replaced by spontaneous public training sessions depending on the animals' mood.

== Access ==
Katsurahama Aquarium can be accessed via local Tosaden Kōtsū bus routes. A city-operated car park for the entirety of Katsurahama Park is located nearby.

== Surrounding area ==
- Katsurahama
- Sakamoto Ryōma Memorial Museum
- Urado Castle ruins
