= Lates lakdiva =

Scientific classification
- Kingdom: Animalia
- Phylum: Chordata
- Class: Actinopterygii
- Order: Carangiformes
- Suborder: Centropomoidei
- Family: Latidae
- Genus: Lates
- Species: L. lakdiva

Binomial name
- Lates lakdiva Pethiyagoda & A. C. Gill, 2012

Species of ray-finned fish

Lates lakdiva is a species of ray-finned fish from the family Latidae, which is only known to occur in western Sri Lanka. It is similar to the barramundi, but its body is not as deep. It is a species of fresh and brackish waters.
