= Lates uwisara =

Scientific classification
- Kingdom: Animalia
- Phylum: Chordata
- Class: Actinopterygii
- Order: Carangiformes
- Suborder: Centropomoidei
- Family: Latidae
- Genus: Lates
- Species: L. uwisara

Binomial name
- Lates uwisara Pethiyagoda & A. C. Gill, 2012

Species of ray-finned fish

Lates uwisara, the Myanmar sea bass, is a species of ray-finned fish from the family Latidae which is only known to occur in Myanmar. It is similar to the barramundi but its body is not as deep. It is a species of fresh and brackish waters. This species appears to have been widely utilised for aquaculture and so may be found as an escape in other regions, there are already records from French Polynesia where there are no native species of Lates.
