= Albert lates =

Conservation status
- Vulnerable (IUCN 3.1)

Scientific classification
- Kingdom: Animalia
- Phylum: Chordata
- Class: Actinopterygii
- Division: Teleostei
- Order: Carangiformes
- Suborder: Centropomoidei
- Family: Latidae
- Genus: Lates
- Species: L. macrophthalmus

Binomial name
- Lates macrophthalmus Worthington, 1929

Synonyms
- Lates niloticus macrophthalmus Worthington, 1929

Species of ray-finned fish

The Albert lates (Lates macrophthalmus) is a freshwater species of lates perch in the class Actinopterygii that is endemic to Lake Albert on the border of the Democratic Republic of the Congo and Uganda. It is assessed as a vulnerable species on the IUCN Red List.

== Taxonomy ==
The Albert lates was first described by Edgar Barton Worthington in 1929. It is classified in the Latidae family (the lates perches) in the order Actinopterygii.

== Ecology ==
The Albert lates is found in open waters at depths of from 20 to 40 m (66 to 131 ft). It can reach a length of 29 cm (11 in) total length. It is commercially important and is also popular as a game fish. It is believed to feed on macroinvertebrates when very young, whereas juveniles and adults prey on fish.

== Management ==
This species is classified as a vulnerable species by the IUCN Red List. Commercial fishing is a significant threat to the population, and the International Union for the Conservation of Nature (IUCN) projects that pressure from fishing will reduce the species's population by 30% by 2031. The fish is only found in Lake Albert, where habitat destruction as a result of oil spills and eutrophication threatens its limited range; the species has an extent of occurrence of fewer than 8,000 km^{2} (3,100 sq mi) and an area of occupancy of less than 6,800 km^{2} (2,600 sq mi).

Previously classified as endangered due to falling populations due to overfishing, the Albert lates's population stabilized after fishers shifted their focus to more numerous species such as Brycinus nurse and Engraulicypris bredoi, though IUCN assesses this as a temporary trend likely to reverse when these other species decrease in abundance.
