= Katsurahama =

Katsurahama may refer to:

- Katsurahama (beach), Kōchi, Japan
- 2961 Katsurahama, a minor planet
