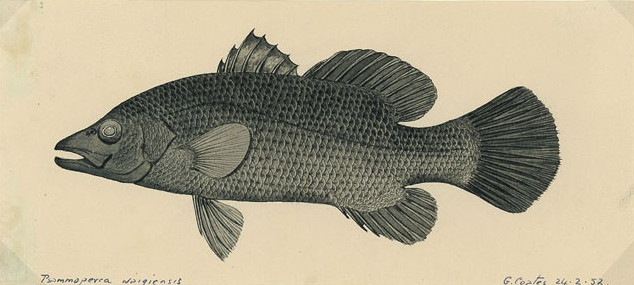

Scientific classification
- Kingdom: Animalia
- Phylum: Chordata
- Class: Actinopterygii
- Order: Carangiformes
- Suborder: Centropomoidei
- Family: Latidae
- Genus: Psammoperca
- Species: P. waigiensis

Binomial name
- Psammoperca waigiensis (G. Cuvier, 1828)

Synonyms
- Labrax waigiensis G. Cuvier, 1828; Cnidon chinensis Müller & Troschel, 1849; Psammoperca vaigiensis G. A. Boulenger, 1895

= Waigieu seaperch =

Species of ray-finned fish

The Waigieu seaperch (Psammoperca waigiensis), or Waigeo barramundi, is a species of marine fish in family Latidae of order Carangiformes. It is native to tropical coastal waters from the Bay of Bengal in the South through Indonesia to northern Australia and north through the Philippines and the South China Sea to Japan.

Reaching a maximum overall length of 47 cm (19 in), P. waigiensis is of brownish to steel-grey colouration, sometimes with white vertical bars along the body. With its typical centropomid body shape, it can be distinguished from the barramundi (Lates calcarifer) from the same waters by its widely set nostrils and shorter maxilla which does not reach back further than the eye (which is reddish).

The Waigeo "sea perch" occurs primarily among rocks and in coral reefs, preferring vegetated waters. It is a nocturnal predator, feeding primarily on crustaceans and other fishes and hiding during the day.

The species is named for Waigeo, an island in Indonesia; the common name is also spelled Waigeo or Weigeu seaperch. It is also known as the sand bass, sand perch, or glasseye perch.
