= Lates longispinis =

Rudolf lates

Conservation status
- Data Deficient (IUCN 3.1)

Scientific classification
- Kingdom: Animalia
- Phylum: Chordata
- Class: Actinopterygii
- Order: Carangiformes
- Suborder: Centropomoidei
- Family: Latidae
- Genus: Lates
- Species: L. longispinis

Binomial name
- Lates longispinis Worthington, 1932

Synonyms
- Lates niloticus longispinis Worthington, 1932

Species of ray-finned fish

Lates longispinis, also known as the Rudolf lates or Turkana perch, is a species of latid fish that is endemic to Lake Turkana (formerly known as Lake Rudolf) in Kenya and Ethiopia. It grows to 57 centimetres (22 in) in length. Lates longispinis is important to commercial fisheries and is also known as a gamefish. It is not known to exist in the aquarium fish trade.

Little is known about its status, and consequently the IUCN classifies it as Data Deficient, but according to Kenya's fisheries department the numbers are rising.

== Behavior ==
=== Feeding ===
The Rudolf lates lives in the deeper waters of the lake, eating prawns off the bottom of the lakes and feeding on schooling characins in the mid-water column.

=== Breeding ===
Not much is known about the breeding habits of L. longispinis. It spawns in the open water in the middle of the lake, and parental care is highly unlikely. The eggs and fry are believed to be pelagic.
