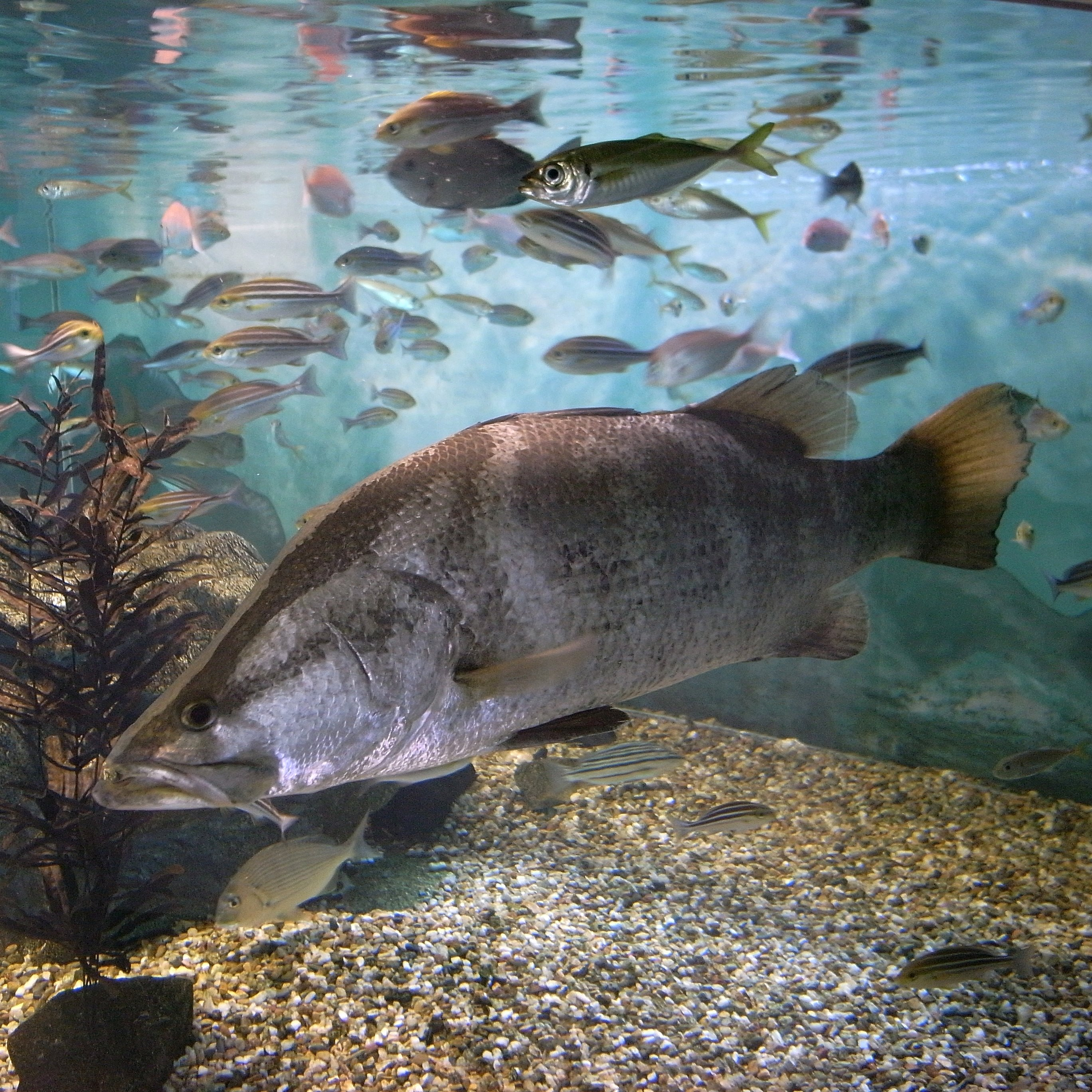
- Japanese lates at Himeji Aquarium

Conservation status
- Vulnerable (IUCN 3.1)

Scientific classification
- Kingdom: Animalia
- Phylum: Chordata
- Class: Actinopterygii
- Order: Carangiformes
- Suborder: Centropomoidei
- Family: Latidae
- Genus: Lates
- Species: L. japonicus

Binomial name
- Lates japonicus Katayama & Y. Taki, 1984

= Japanese lates =

Species of fish

The Japanese lates (Lates japonicus), also known as the akame (from the Japanese 赤目, アカメ, literally "red eye") or Japanese barramundi, is a species of fish found in Japan. A bottom-dweller restricted to estuarine habitats and large rivers in the Pacific coastal western parts of the country, it is threatened by habitat destruction. As it is similar to the related barramundi, it was classified as the same species until 1984.

== Description ==
The Japanese lates has a comparatively long and compressed body with a large mouth. It is a metallic grey in overall colour, with a bluish tint, darker upperparts, and lighter underparts. Its fins are greyish black with white tips, and its pupils are red. While similar to the barramundi, it differs in several features. It has a taller and deeper body (averaging a much greater size), longer third dorsal and second anal spines, fewer pectoral fin rays, more scales, and fewer gill rakers. It reaches an officially recorded maximum length of 130 cm (51 in) and a maximum weight of 33 kg (73 lb).

== Taxonomy ==
Having previously been considered to be the same as the barramundi (Lates calcifer), Lates japonicus was first scientifically described in 1984. Even when it was realised as a separate species, publication of a formal description was delayed since the type specimen of the barramundi was alleged to originate in Japan, and because of confusion caused by the deformities of the barramundi's type specimen. Both the barramundi and the Japanese lates are classified with about 10 other species in the genus Lates, which in turn is in the family Latidae (or in older classifications, Centropomidae).

== Ecology ==
The Japanese lates is a bottom dweller in the freshwater shallows, estuaries, and the ocean. It is known in the south-western part of the Japanese main islands, where it is found in the seas around Tosa Bay, in Kōchi Prefecture, Shikoku, and near Miyazaki City in Miyazaki Prefecture, Kyushu. It is believed to spawn there, and younger fish are found up the Ōyodo and Shimanto Rivers. The barramundi is believed to replace it in the Ryukyu Islands.

The Japanese lates has long been known to fishermen, but because of its relative rarity and shyness, it achieved "almost legendary" status. For some time, scientists were uncertain which fish was the "akame" of legend, and some suspected Psammoperca waigiensis. It is kept in aquaria and cultured for food, but is poorly known in the wild. In February 2010, the first video of the akame living in its natural surroundings was broadcast on the BBC, in a report on the University of Tokyo's research project where Japanese lates were fitted with ultrasound tracking devices.
