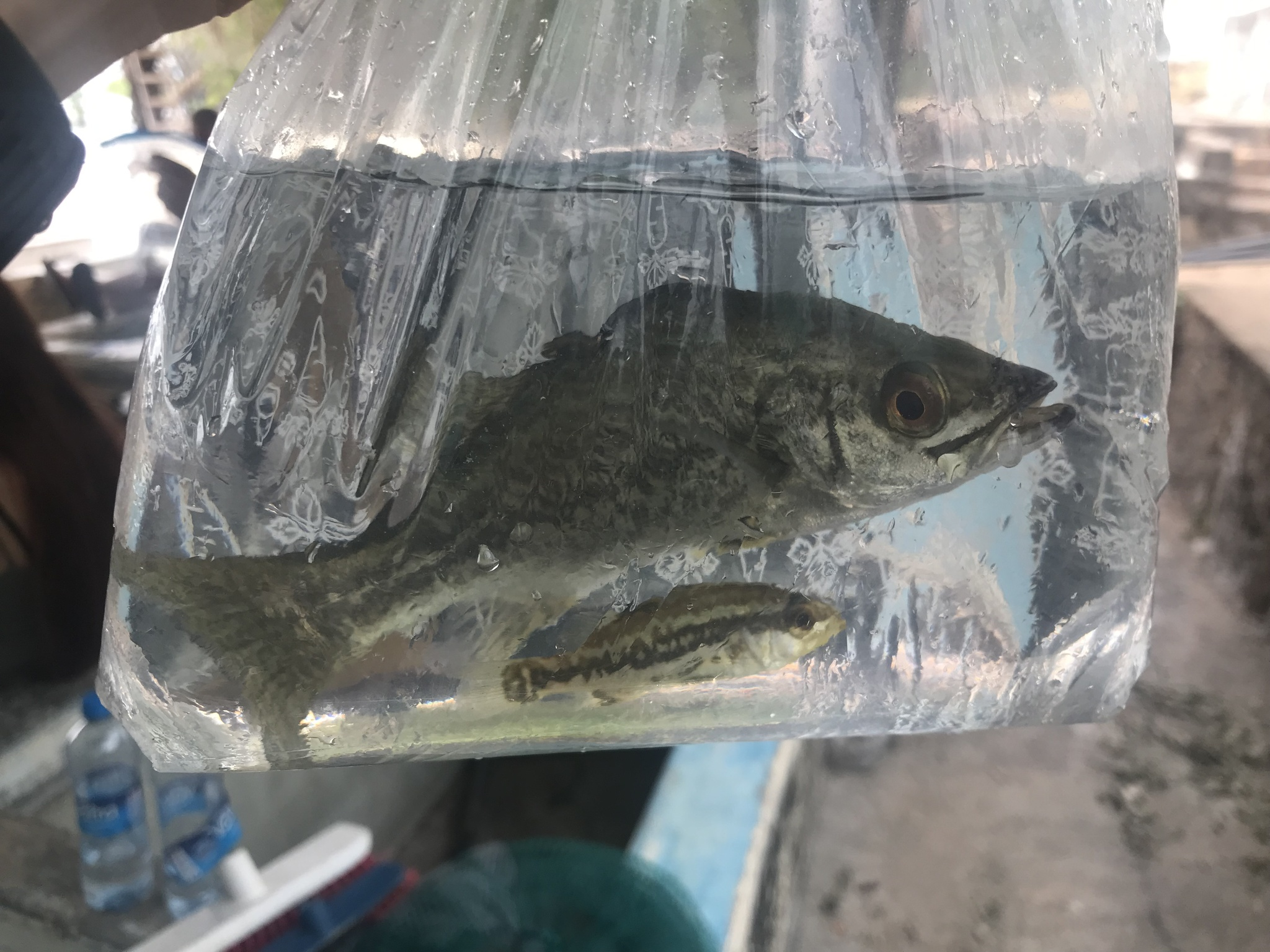

Conservation status
- Vulnerable (IUCN 3.1)

Scientific classification
- Kingdom: Animalia
- Phylum: Chordata
- Class: Actinopterygii
- Division: Teleostei
- Order: Carangiformes
- Suborder: Centropomoidei
- Family: Latidae
- Genus: Lates
- Species: L. mariae

Binomial name
- Lates mariae Steindachner, 1909

= Bigeye lates =

Species of ray-finned fish

The bigeye lates (Lates mariae) is a species of lates perch native to Lake Tanganyika and from the Lualaba drainage in the Democratic Republic of the Congo. Juveniles inhabit inshore habitats while adults inhabit benthic environments in deeper waters, being the top predator at depths of 100 metres (330 ft) and greater. It is known to make diurnal migrations to surface waters to prey on pelagic fishes. This species can reach a length of 80 centimetres (31 in) TL. This species is commercially important and is also popular as a game fish.
