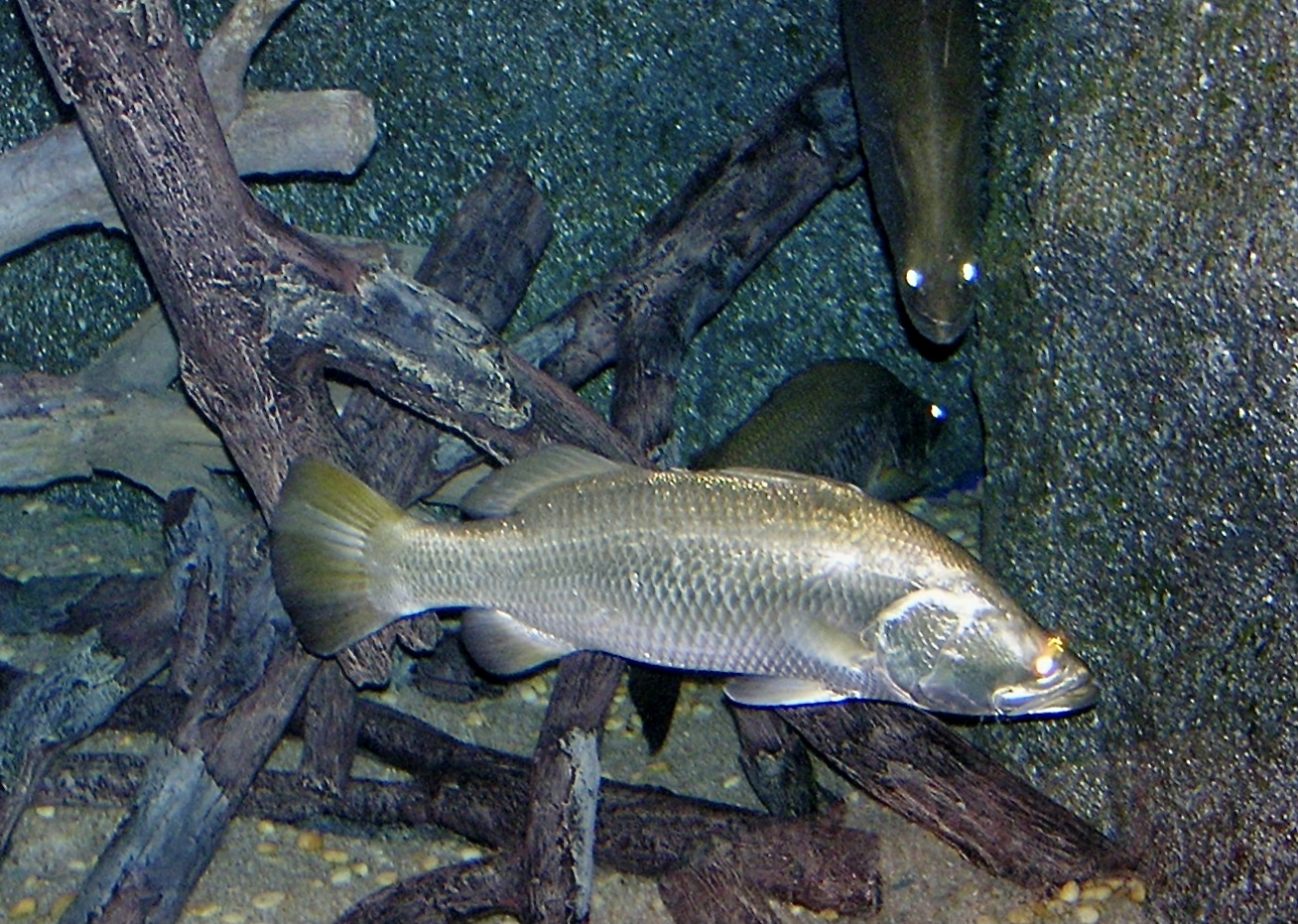
- Barramundi (L. calcarifer) displaying eyeshine

Scientific classification
- Kingdom: Animalia
- Phylum: Chordata
- Class: Actinopterygii
- Division: Teleostei
- Order: Carangiformes
- Suborder: Centropomoidei
- Family: Latidae
- Genus: Lates; G. Cuvier, 1828

Type species
- Lates niloticus Linnaeus, 1758

Synonyms
- Luciolates Boulenger, 1914; Pseudolates Alleyne & W. J. Macleay, 1877

= Lates =

Lates Temporal range: 33.9–0 Ma Early Oligocene to present

Genus of fishes

Lates is a genus of freshwater and euryhaline lates perches belonging to the family Latidae. The generic name is also used as a common name, lates, for many of the species.

All species are predatory, and the Nile perch (L. niloticus), in particular, has become infamous as an invasive species after its introduction into the East African Lake Victoria, where many native Haplochromines were driven extinct. In contrast, the Nile perch itself is somewhat threatened in its native habitat, similar to many members of the genus Lates with relatively restricted distributions.

== Etymology ==
The generic name Lates derives from the Latin latēre (to be hidden).

== Description ==
These fishes range in size from less than 30 to 200 cm (1 to 7 ft) in maximum overall length, the largest species reaching weights up to 200 kg (440 lb). They all have the characteristic centropomid shape, with the two-part dorsal fin and general percoid form.

All species are carnivorous, preying on aquatic invertebrates and other fish in a wide variety of habitats.

== Distribution and habitat ==
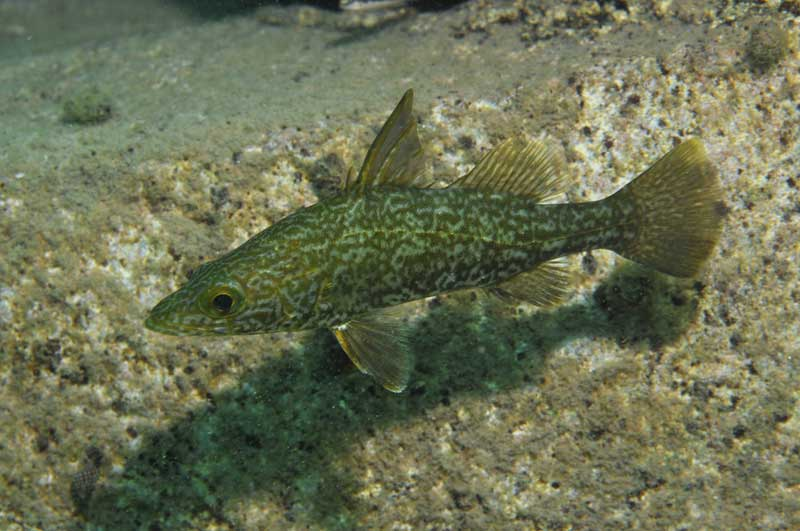
The greatest species diversity is in the Rift Valley lakes, with four endemic to Tanganyika (L. angustifrons shown), one to Albert and one to Turkana

These fishes are native to freshwater and marine waters of Africa, Asia, the Indian Ocean, and the western Pacific Ocean. Several species are endemic to the Rift Valley lakes in Africa.

== Taxonomy ==
=== Extant species ===
Currently, 11 recognized species are placed in this genus:

- Lates angustifrons Boulenger, 1906 (Tanganyika lates)
- Lates calcarifer (Bloch, 1790) (barramundi)
- Lates japonicus Katayama & Y. Taki, 1984 (Japanese lates) (Japanese barramundi)
- Lates lakdiva Pethiyagoda & A. C. Gill, 2012
- Lates longispinis Worthington, 1932 (Rudolf lates)
- Lates macrophthalmus Worthington, 1929 (Albert lates)
- Lates mariae Steindachner, 1909 (bigeye lates)
- Lates microlepis Boulenger, 1898 (forktail lates)
- Lates niloticus (Linnaeus, 1758) (Nile perch)
- Lates stappersii (Boulenger, 1914) (sleek lates)
- Lates uwisara Pethiyagoda & A. C. Gill, 2012

=== Extinct species ===
Extinct species within this genus include:

- †Lates arambourgi Stewart & Murray, 2008 - Pliocene/Pleistocene of Ethiopia
- †Lates bispinosus Gaudant & Sen, 1979 - Neogene of Turkey
- ?†Lates croaticus Gorjanović-Kramberger, 1902 - Miocene of Croatia
- ?†Lates gregarius Bannikov, 1992 - late Miocene of Moldova
- ?†Lates macropterus Bassani, 1889 - Oligocene of Italy
- ?†Lates karungae Greenwood, 1951 - Miocene of Kenya
- †Lates odessanus Kovalchuk, Otero, Barkaszi, Murray & Divay, 2023 - latest Miocene of Ukraine
- †Lates partschi Heckel, 1856 - mid-Miocene of Austria
- †Lates qatraniensis Murray & Attia 2004 - Early Oligocene of Egypt

Extinct species within this genus lived from the early Oligocene epoch to the present. Fossils have been found in Africa (Libya, Egypt, Kenya, Tunisia, Chad, Uganda, the Democratic Republic of the Congo, Niger, and Sudan), France (Molasse basin), Saudi Arabia, and Slovakia. Earlier specimens from the Eocene are now placed in their own genus, Eolates.

Prehistoric Lates appear to have had significant species diversity in the marine basins of the Mediterranean and Paratethys, but appear to have been significantly affected by salinity fluctuations, leading to their eventual extinction. In the present day, the only surviving Lates in this region is the Nile perch, L. niloticus, in estuarine habitats in North Africa.
