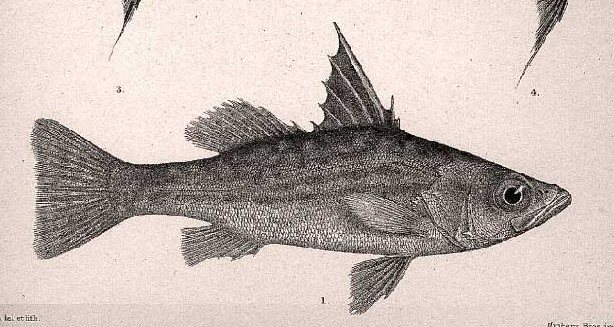

Conservation status
- Endangered (IUCN 3.1)

Scientific classification
- Kingdom: Animalia
- Phylum: Chordata
- Class: Actinopterygii
- Order: Carangiformes
- Suborder: Centropomoidei
- Family: Latidae
- Genus: Lates
- Species: L. microlepis

Binomial name
- Lates microlepis Boulenger, 1898

= Forktail lates =

Species of ray-finned fish

The forktail lates (Lates microlepis) is a species of lates perch endemic to Lake Tanganyika. Juveniles inhabit inshore habitats, moving as adults to open-water pelagic zones where it preys on other fishes. This species can reach a length of 93 centimetres (37 in) TL and the greatest reported weight of this species is 8.3 kilograms (18 lb). It is a commercially important species and is also popular as a game fish.
