= Psammoperca =

Scientific classification
- Kingdom: Animalia
- Phylum: Chordata
- Class: Actinopterygii
- Order: Carangiformes
- Suborder: Centropomoidei
- Family: Latidae
- Genus: Psammoperca; Richardson, 1848

Type species
- Psammoperca datnioides P. Richardson, 1848

Synonyms
- Cnidon J. P. Müller & Troschel, 1849

Genus of ray-finned fishes

Psammoperca is a small genus of marine ray-finned fishes from the family Latidae. They are native to the eastern Indian Ocean and the western Pacific Ocean. The generic name Psammoperca derives from the Greek ψάμμος (sand) and πέρκη (perch), though this refers to the fish’s dentition, not to a sandy habitat preference. Richardson described the teeth as being "granular".

== Species ==
There are currently 2 recognized species in this genus:

- Psammoperca datnioides Richardson, 1848 (Black sand bass)
- Psammoperca waigiensis (Cuvier, 1828) (Waigieu seaperch)
