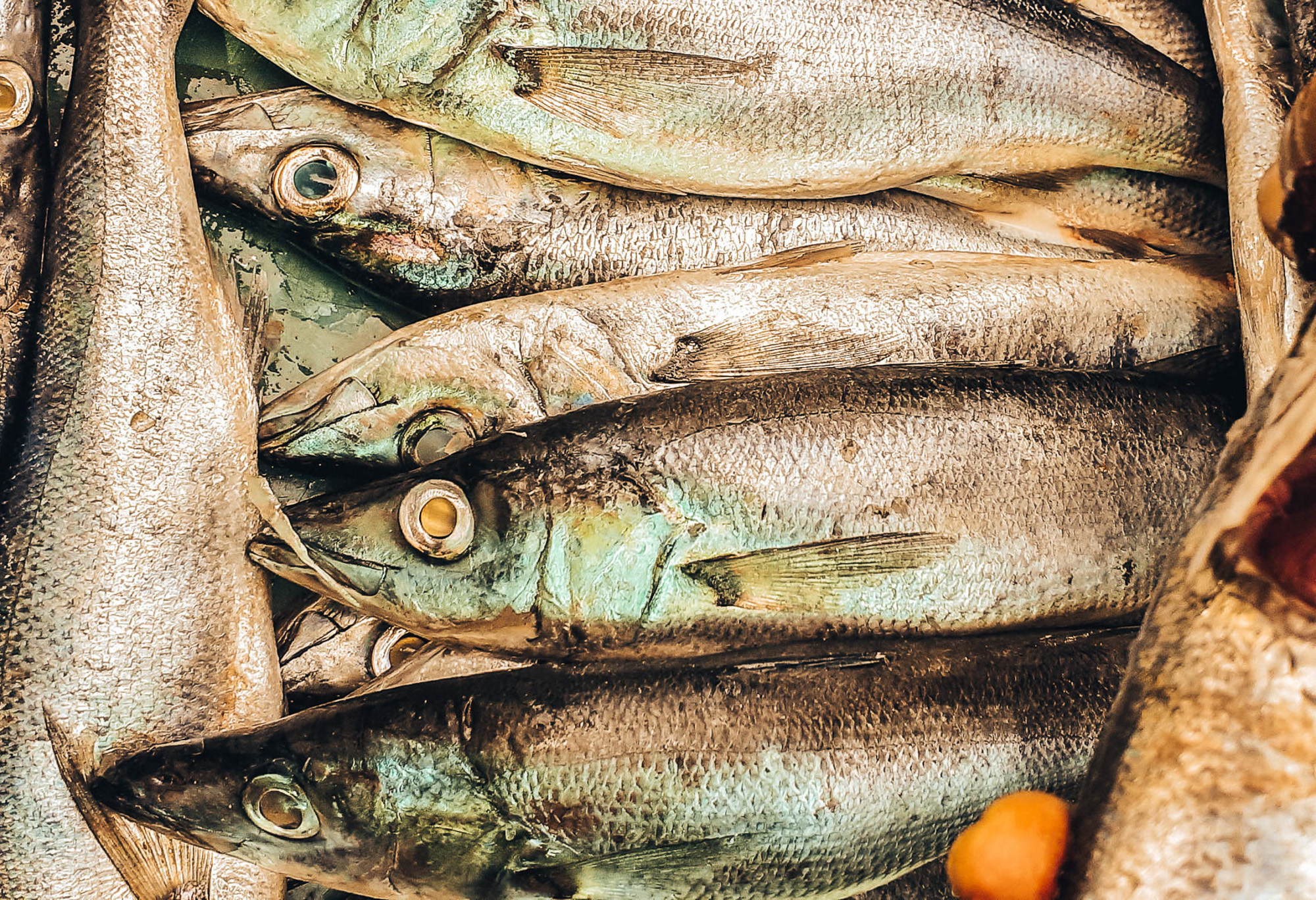

Conservation status
- Least Concern (IUCN 3.1)

Scientific classification
- Kingdom: Animalia
- Phylum: Chordata
- Class: Actinopterygii
- Order: Carangiformes
- Suborder: Centropomoidei
- Family: Latidae
- Genus: Lates
- Species: L. stappersii

Binomial name
- Lates stappersii (Boulenger, 1914)

Synonyms
- Luciolates stappersii Boulenger, 1914; Luciolates brevior Boulenger, 1914

= Sleek lates =

Species of ray-finned fish

The sleek lates (Lates stappersi) is a species of lates perch endemic to Lake Tanganyika. It is locally known as Mikebuka (Tanzania) or Mukeke (Democratic Republic of the Congo and Burundi). This species can reach a length of 45 centimetres (18 in) SL. It is very important to local commercial fisheries.
