= Katsurahama (beach) =

Beach in Japan

- Beach
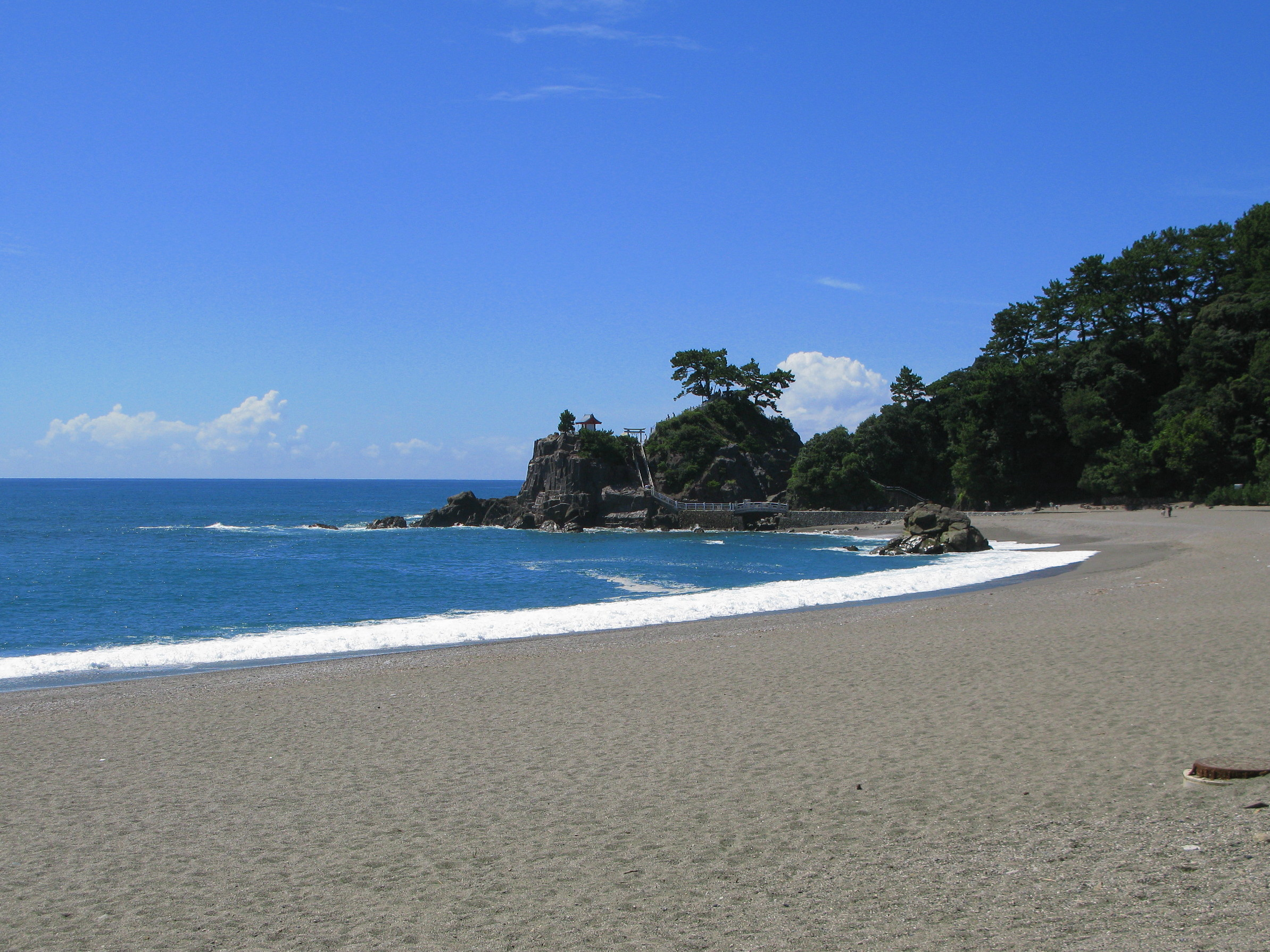
- Katsurahama Beach

- Coordinates: 33°29′43.79″N 133°34′25.81″E
- Location: Japan
- Part of: Urado Bay
- Offshore water bodies: Pacific Ocean

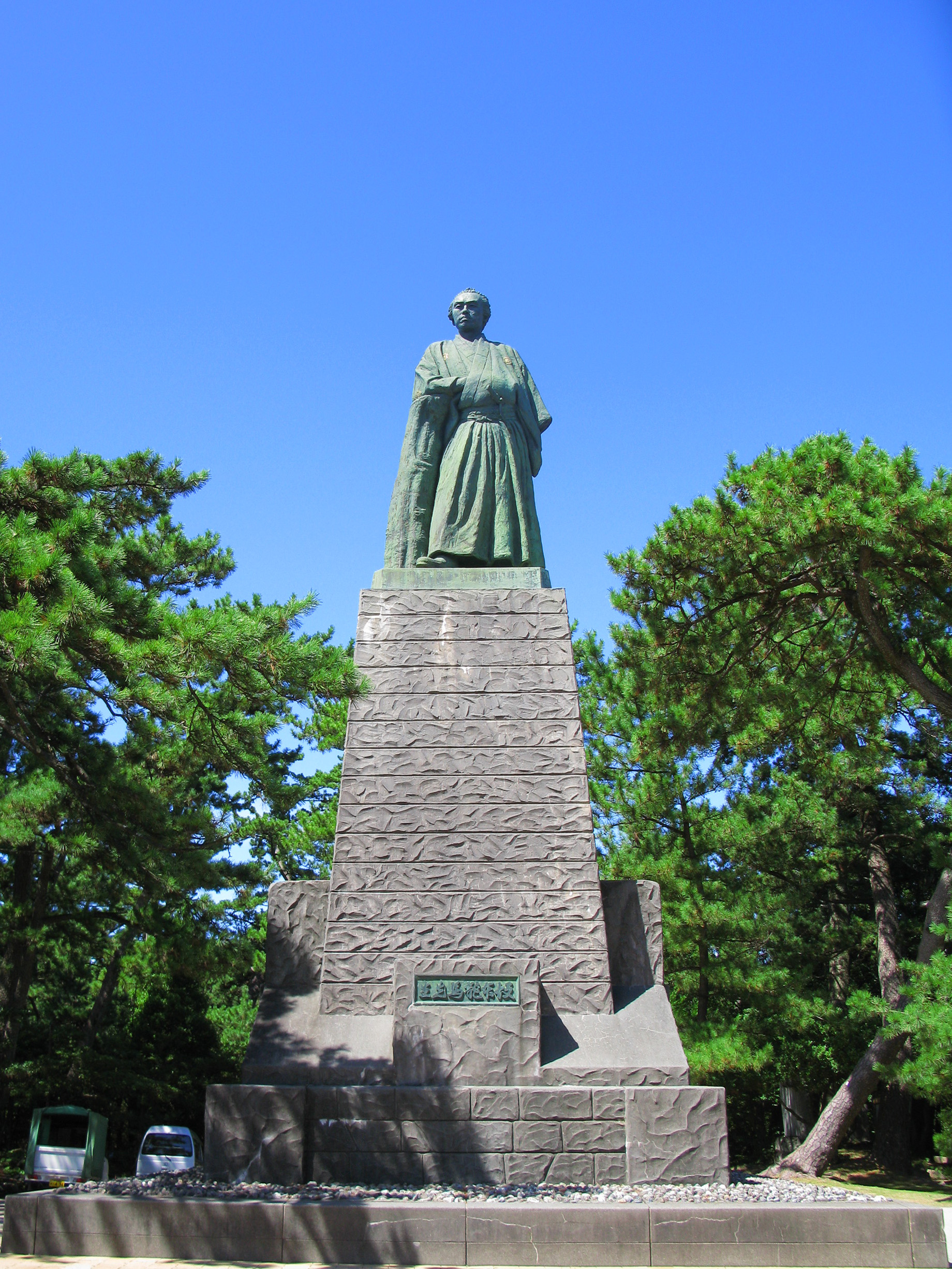
Statue of Sakamoto Ryōma

Katsurahama (Japanese: 桂浜; lit. 'Katsura Beach') is a beach in Kōchi, Japan, located on Urado Bay and overlooking the Pacific Ocean. It is a local recreation spot known for its statue of Sakamoto Ryōma overlooking the beach.

== History ==
Chōsokabe Motochika built Urado Castle on a hill near Katsurahama in 1591 due to floods around Okō Castle, his original residence. The castle was abandoned after Yamauchi Kazutoyo took over Tosa and moved the court to Kōchi Castle in 1603. Sakamoto Ryōma Memorial Museum now sits on the site of the ruins.

In 1928, a group of youths gathered funds to place the now-famous memorial statue of Sakamoto Ryōma, a Kōchi native, on a small hill overlooking the beach. The statue and the beach itself remain popular destinations for tourists. The yosakoi melody also references Katsurahama and Urado Bay in its lyrics depicting well-known locations in Kōchi.

In 1931, Katsurahama Aquarium opened nearby, moving to its present location on the beach in 1984. The area around the beach was organized as Katsurahama Park and opened on March 20, 1951. In 1971, the Kōchi city government finalized plans to designate the 22.5 hectare area as a city park. An additional concrete resting area with food services and an observation deck was constructed and opened in 2021.

== Transportation ==
Katsurahama can be accessed via local Tosaden Kōtsū bus routes. A city-operated car park is located on the premises.

== Gallery ==
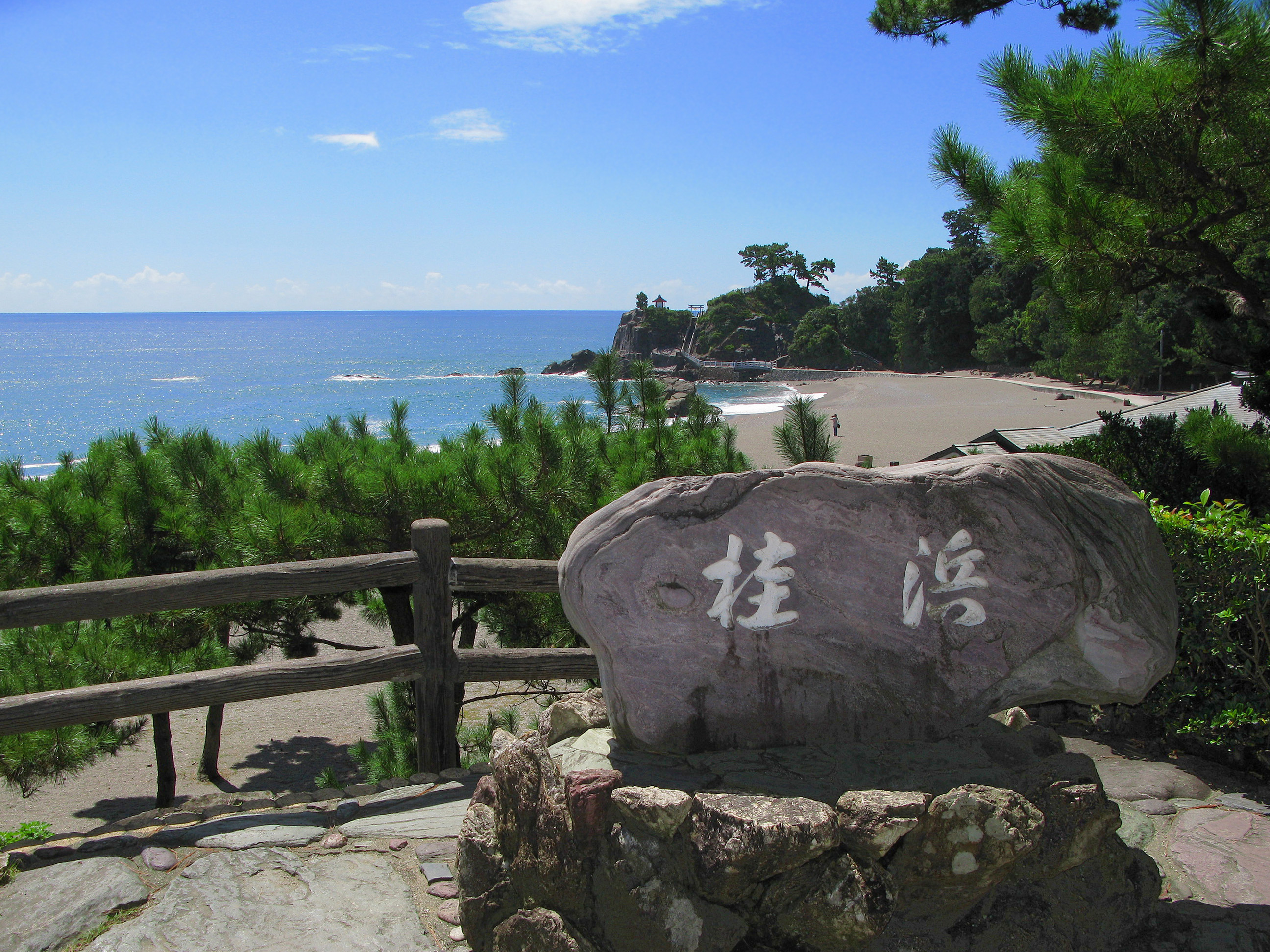
Stone stele inscribed with 'Katsurahama' at the entrance of the beach

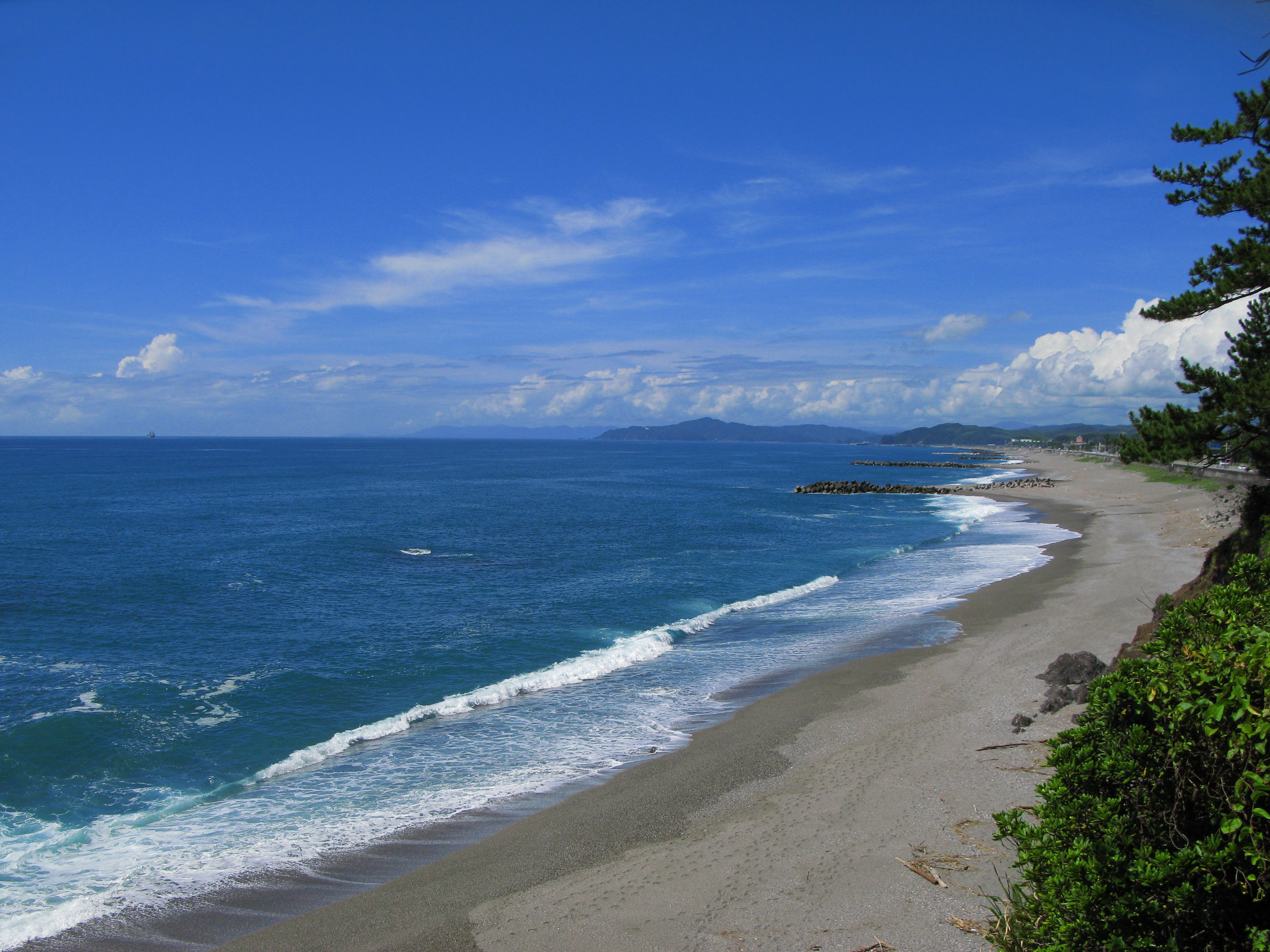
Looking west of Katsurahama from Ryuo Cape

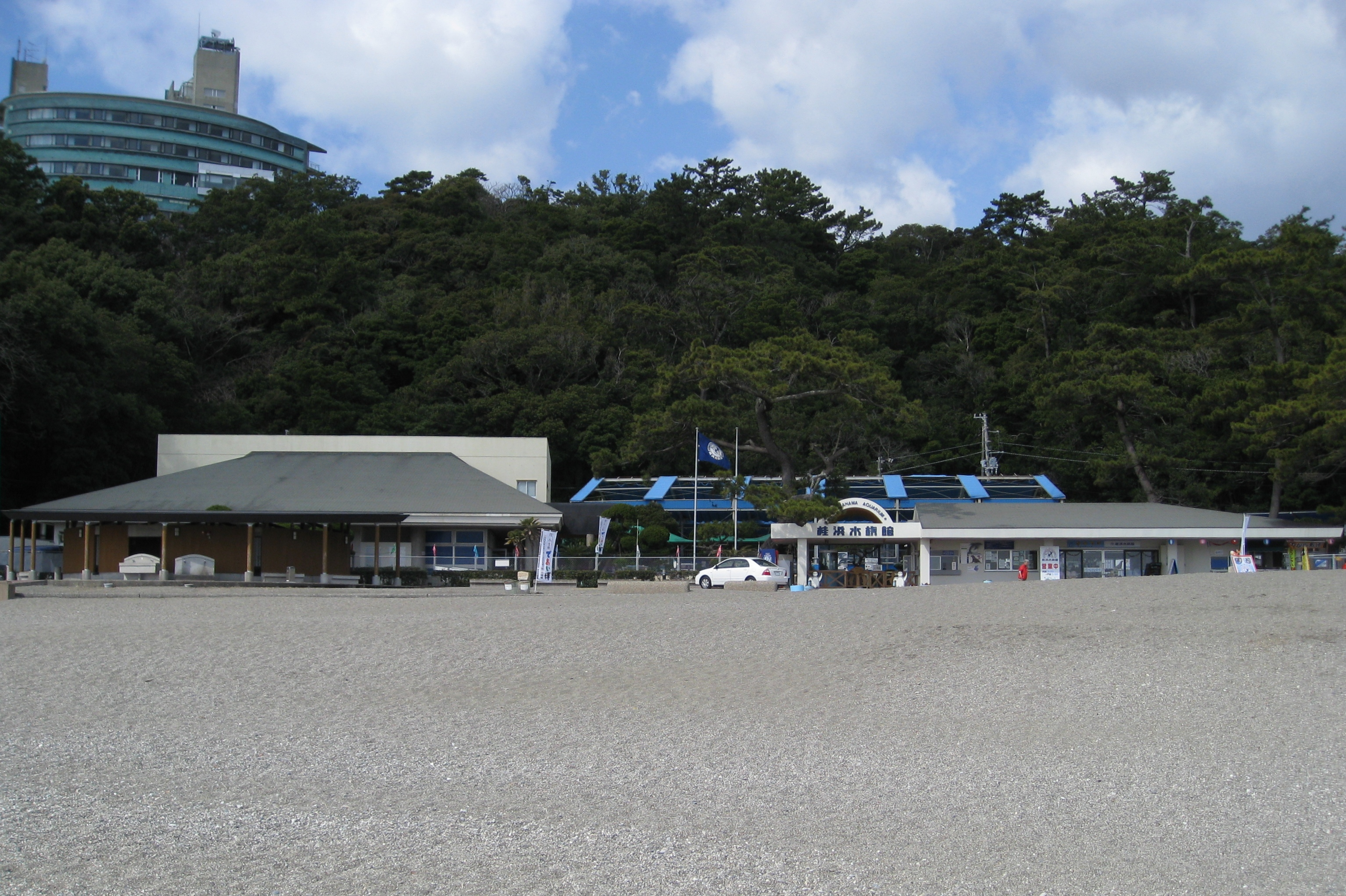
Katsurahama Aquarium

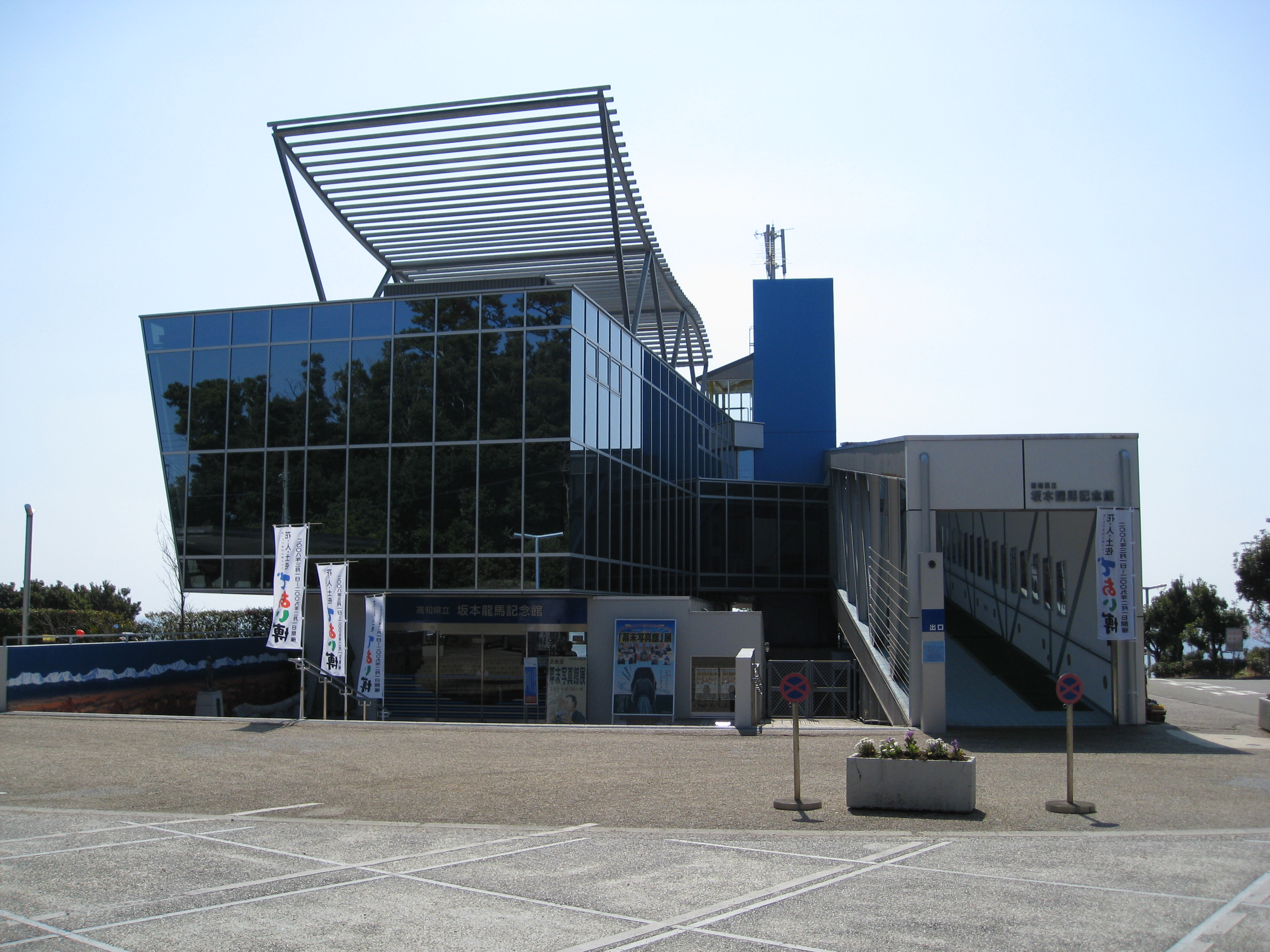
Sakamoto Ryōma Memorial Museum

== Surrounding area ==
- Katsurahama Aquarium
- Sakamoto Ryōma Memorial Museum
- Urado Castle ruins
- Watatsumi Shrine
