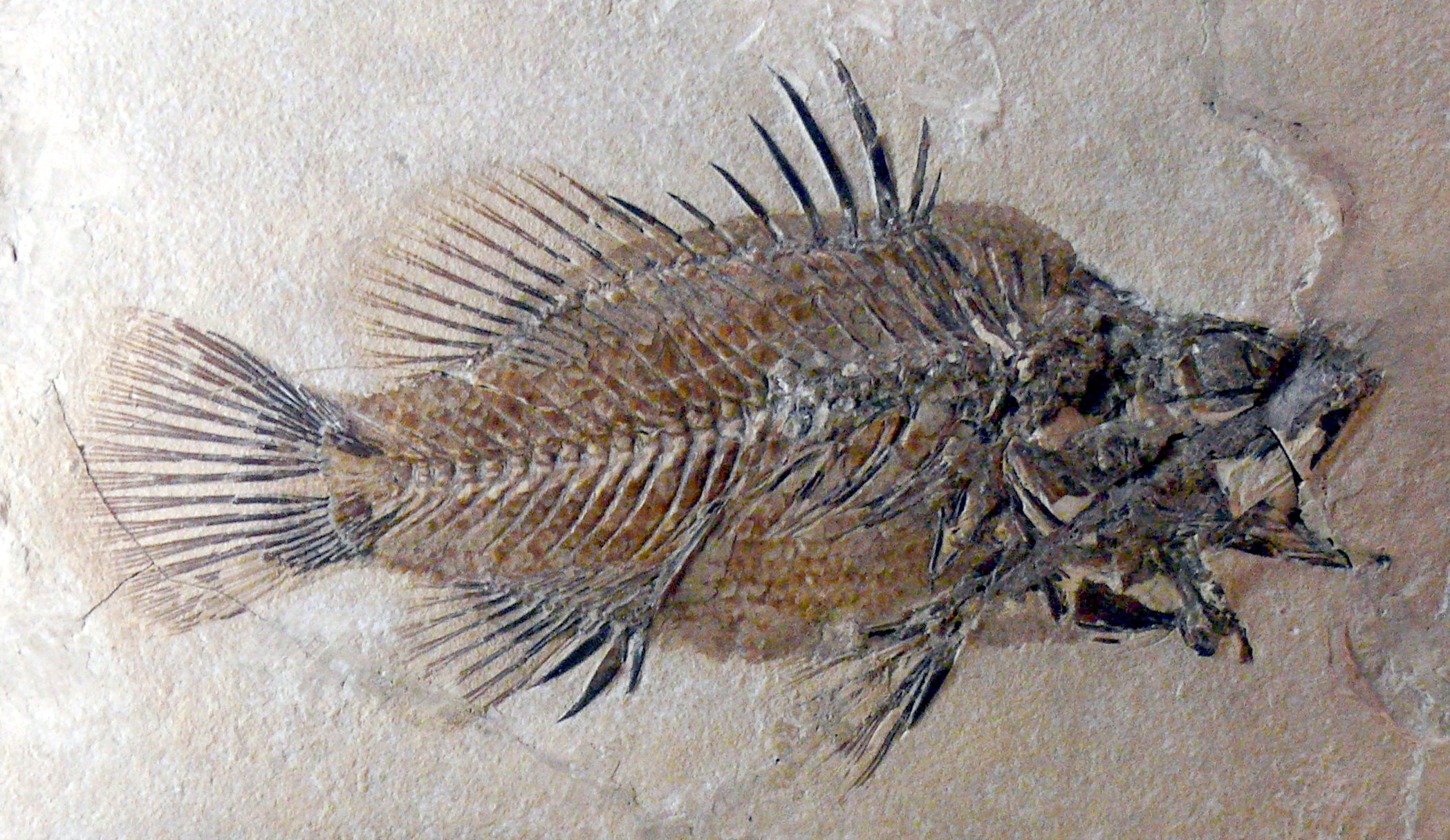
- Specimen of E. gracilis, Natural History Museum, Berlin

Scientific classification
- Kingdom: Animalia
- Phylum: Chordata
- Class: Actinopterygii
- Order: Carangiformes
- Suborder: Centropomoidei
- Family: Latidae
- Genus: †Eolates; Sorbini, 1970

Type species
- †Lates gracilis Agassiz, 1833

Species
- E. aquensis (Gaudant, 1977); E. gracilis (Agassiz, 1833); E. macrurus (Agassiz, 1833)

= Eolates =

Eolates Temporal range: Early Eocene to Late Oligocene

Extinct genus of fishes

Eolates ("dawn Lates") is an extinct genus of prehistoric lates perch from the Paleogene of Europe. It contains three species, two marine and one freshwater, known from the early-middle Eocene and Late Oligocene.

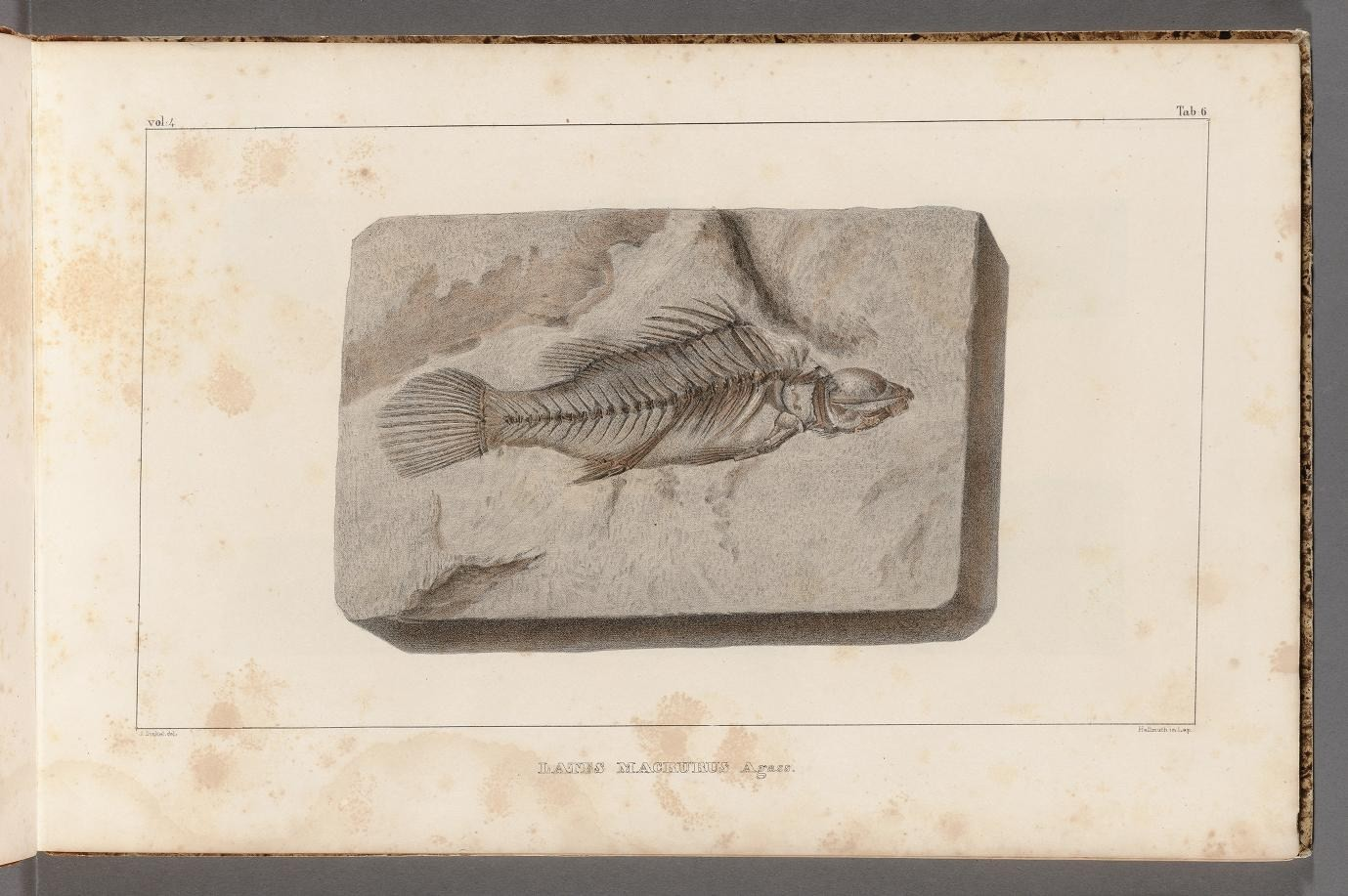
Type specimen of E. macrurus

The following species are known:

- E. aquensis (Gaudant, 1977) - Late Oligocene of France (Aix-en-Provence Formation) (=Lates aquensis Gaudant, 1977)
- E. gracilis (Agassiz, 1833) (type species) - Early Eocene of Italy (Monte Bolca) (=Lates gracilis Agassiz, 1833)
- E. macrurus (Agassiz, 1833) - Middle Eocene (Lutetian) of France (Lutetian limestone) (=Lates macrurus Agassiz, 1833)

The single late-surviving freshwater species, E. aquensis, may be distinct enough to belong to its own genus.

== See also ==
- Prehistoric fish
- List of prehistoric bony fish
