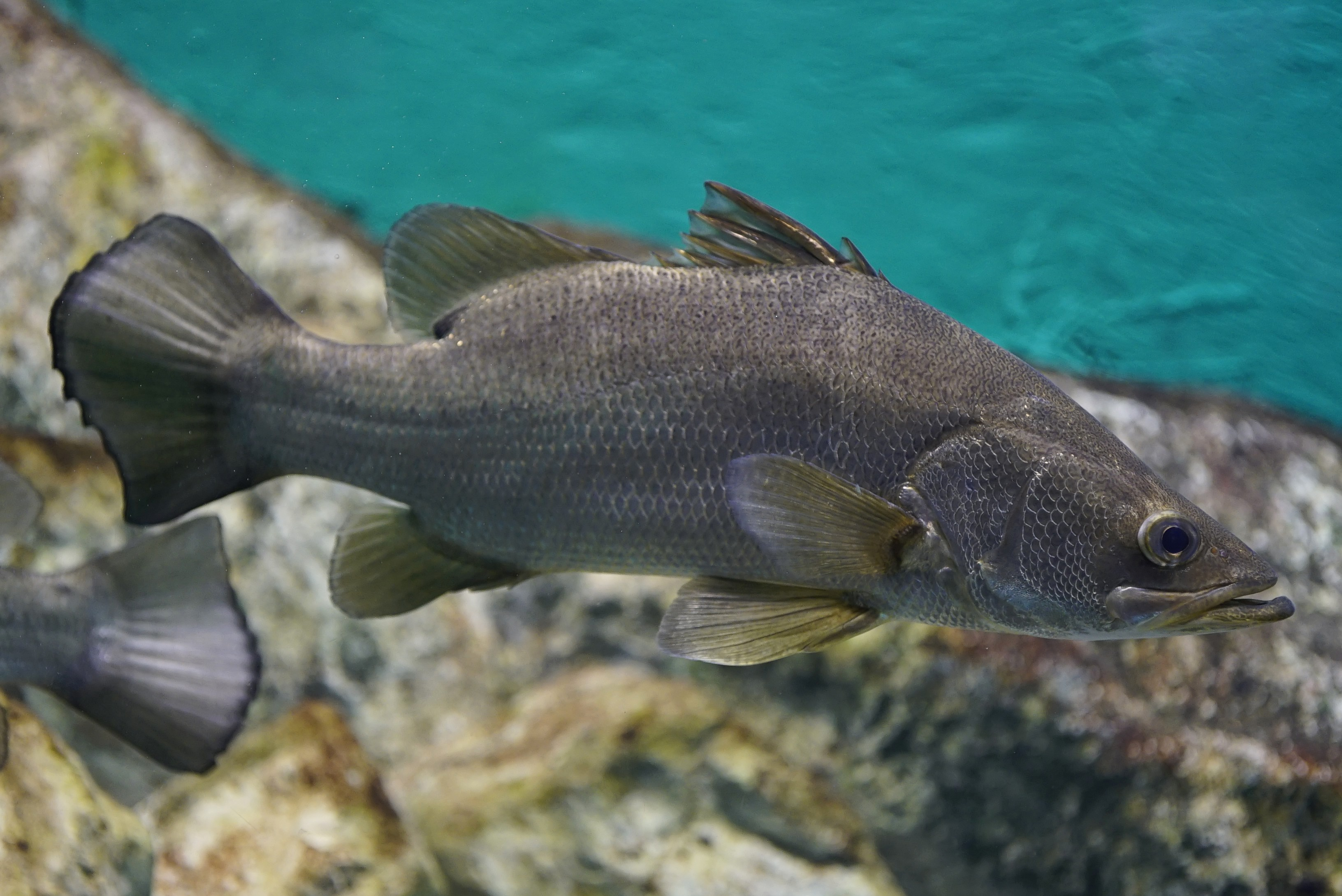
- Lates niloticus

Conservation status
- Least Concern (IUCN 3.1)

Scientific classification
- Kingdom: Animalia
- Phylum: Chordata
- Class: Actinopterygii
- Division: Teleostei
- Order: Carangiformes
- Suborder: Centropomoidei
- Family: Latidae
- Genus: Lates
- Species: L. niloticus

Binomial name
- Lates niloticus (Linnaeus, 1758)

Synonyms
- Labrus niloticus Linnaeus, 1758; Centropomus niloticus (Linnaeus, 1758); Lates niloticus macrolepidota Pellegrin, 1922; Lates albertianus Worthington, 1929; Lates niloticus albertianus Worthington, 1929; Lates nilotus rudolfianus Worthington, 1929

= Nile perch =

Species of ray-finned fish

Capture (blue) and aquaculture (green) production of Nile perch (Lates niloticus) in thousand tonnes from 1950 to 2022, as reported by the FAO

The Nile perch (Lates niloticus), also known as the African snook, Goliath perch, Nile lates, African lates, Goliath lates, Victoria lates, African barramundi, Goliath barramundi, Giant lates or the Victoria perch, is a species of freshwater fish in the family Latidae of the order Carangiformes. It is widespread throughout much of the Afrotropical realm, being native to the Congo, Nile, Senegal, Niger and Lake Chad, Volta, Lake Turkana, and other river basins. It also occurs in the brackish waters of Lake Maryut in Egypt. The Nile perch is a fish of substantial economic and food-security importance in East Africa. Originally described as Labrus niloticus, among the marine wrasses, the species has also been referred to as Centropomus niloticus. Common names include African snook, Victoria perch (a misleading trade name, as the species is not native to Lake Victoria, though they have been introduced there), and many local names in various African languages, such as the Luo name mbuta or mputa. In Tanzania, it is called sangara, sankara, or chenku. In Francophone African countries, it is known as capitaine. Its name in the Hausa language is giwan ruwa, meaning "water elephant".

== Description ==
L. niloticus is silver in color with a blue tinge. It has distinctive dark-black eyes, with a bright-yellow outer ring. One of the largest freshwater fishes, it reaches a maximum length of nearly 2 m (6 ft 7 in), weighing up to 200 kg (440 lb). Mature fish typically range from 1.21–1.37 m (4 ft 0 in – 4 ft 6 in), although many fish are caught before they can grow this large.

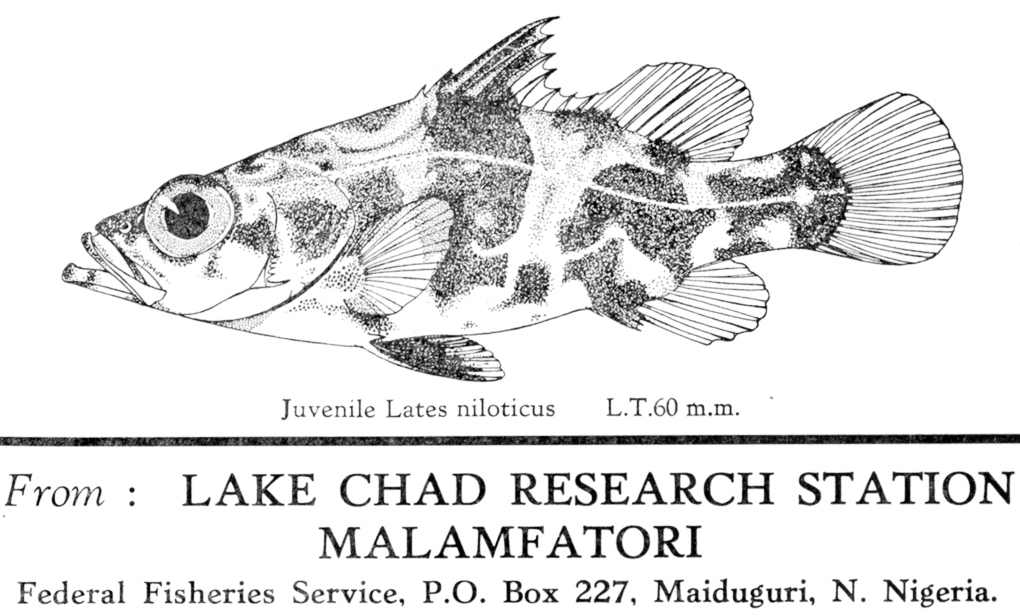

Adult Nile perch occupy all habitats of a lake with sufficient oxygen concentrations, while juveniles are restricted to shallow or nearshore environments. A fierce predator that dominates its surroundings, the Nile perch feeds on fish (including its own species), crustaceans, molluscs, and insects; the juveniles also feed on zooplankton. Nile perch use schooling as a mechanism to protect themselves from other predators.

== Invasive species ==
Nile perch have been introduced to many other lakes in Africa, including Lake Victoria and the artificial Lake Nasser. The World Conservation Union's Invasive Species Specialist Group considers L. niloticus one of the world's 100 worst invasive species.

The state of Queensland in Australia levies heavy fines on anyone found in possession of a living Nile perch, since it competes directly with the native barramundi, which is similar and grows to 1.5 m (4 ft 11 in) long, while the Nile perch grows to 2.0 m (6 ft 7 in) long.

The species is of great commercial importance as a food fish. The Nile perch is also popular with sport anglers, as it attacks artificial fishing lures, and it is also raised in aquaculture.

=== Lake Victoria introduction ===
The introduction of this species to Lake Victoria is one of the most cited examples of the negative effects alien species can have on ecosystems.

The Nile perch was introduced to Lake Victoria in East Africa in the 1950s, and has since been fished commercially. In 2003, Nile perch sales to the EU reached 169 million euros. Sport-fishing in the region of Uganda and Tanzania provided additional income from tourism.

Its introduction was ecologically disruptive and is attributed with causing the extinction or near-extinction of several hundred native species, with some populations fluctuating with commercial fishing and the actual Nile perch stocks. The Nile perch initially fed on native cichlids, but with decreasing availability of this prey, it now consumes mainly small shrimp and minnows.

The alteration of the native ecosystem had disruptive socioeconomic effects on local communities bordering the lake. Many local people have been displaced from their traditional occupations in the fishing trade and brought them into the cash economy, or before the establishment of export-oriented fisheries, turned them into economic refugees. At least initially, nets strong enough to hold adult Nile perch could not be manufactured locally and had to be imported for a high price.

The introduction of Nile perch has also had additional ecological effects on shore. Native cichlids were traditionally sun-dried, but because Nile perch have a high fat content (higher than cichlids), they need to be smoked to avoid spoiling. This has led to an increased demand for firewood in a region already hard-hit by deforestation, soil erosion, and desertification.

The Academy Award-nominated documentary Darwin's Nightmare by Hubert Sauper (a French-Austrian-Belgian production, 2004) deals with the damage that has been caused by Nile perch introduction, including the import of weapons and ammunition in cargo planes from Europe, which are then used to export Nile perch, further exacerbating conflict and misery in the surrounding regions.

Regardless of whether it is considered positive or negative, the trophic web of Lake Victoria appears to have been drastically impoverished by the introduction of this novel near-top-level predator. While the ecosystem seems to be moving towards a new equilibrium, neither its former state nor the state of fisheries on Lake Victoria can ever easily be brought back.

== Threats ==
Despite being a successful invasive species, the fish faces threats. Being a species of megafauna, the most obvious threats to the species are overfishing and the use of illegal fishing gear, as well as invasive water hyacinths. Prey depletion is also a factor, as it decreases the size of the fish and makes it vulnerable to larger predators, such as crocodiles.

== Export ==
In 2021, the Uganda Fish Processors and Exporters Association called on the parliament to ban the local consumption of the species so as to protect its export.

== Religion ==
Nile perch were involved with the worship of Neith. As a result nile perch were sometimes mummified. A deposit of several thousand mummified perch was excavated in an area to the west of Esna where there was a temple to Neith. Mummified perch have also been found at Gurob near a temple to Neith while perch statuettes have been found at Sais again in the context of a temple to Neith.

== See also ==
- Nile tilapia — a similar-named but different fish that is much smaller and mostly feeds on plant matter
