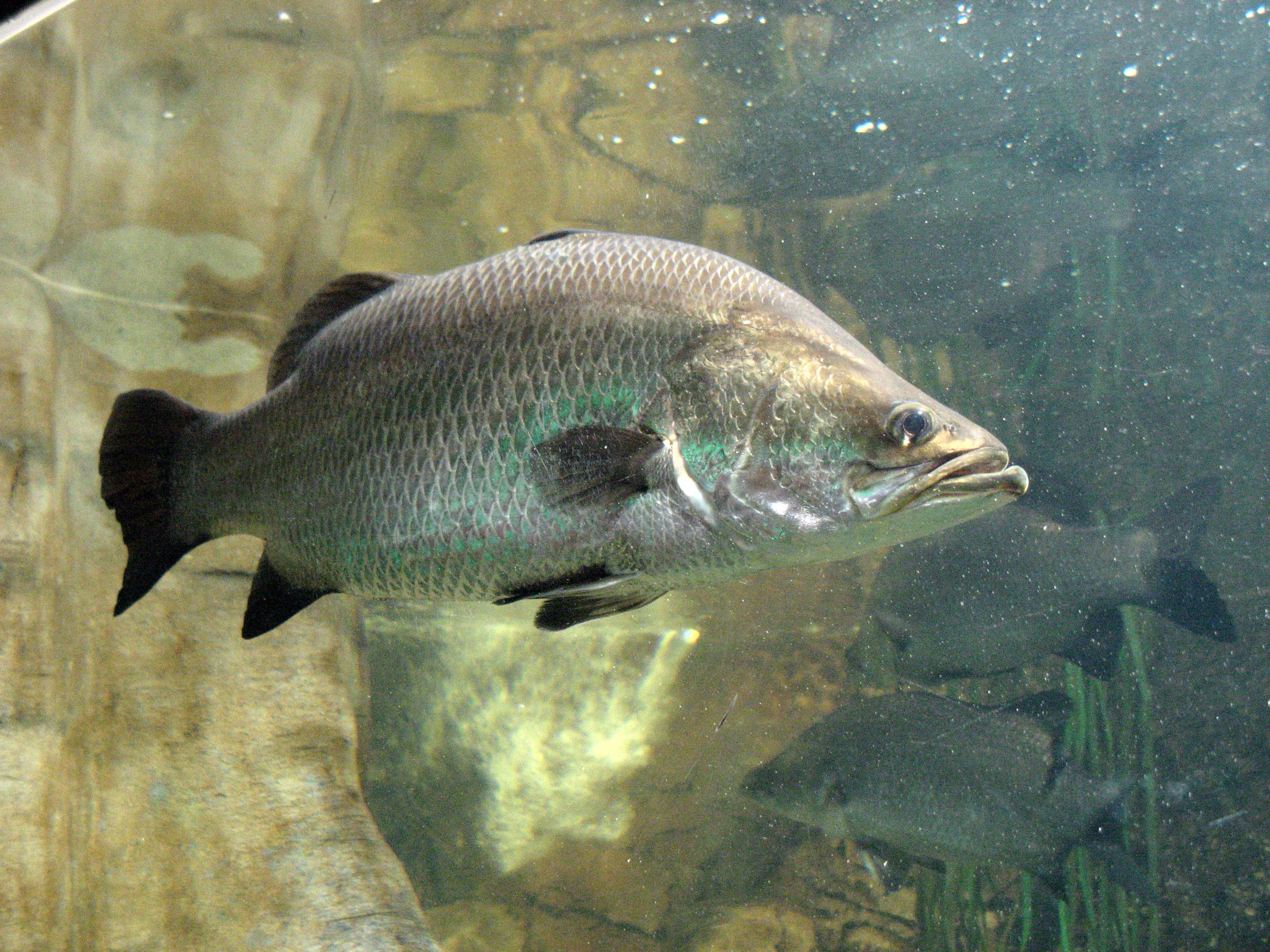
- A barramundi at the National Zoo & Aquarium, Canberra, Australia.

Conservation status
- Least Concern (IUCN 3.1)

Scientific classification
- Kingdom: Animalia
- Phylum: Chordata
- Class: Actinopterygii
- Division: Teleostei
- Order: Carangiformes
- Suborder: Centropomoidei
- Family: Latidae
- Genus: Lates
- Species: L. calcarifer

Binomial name
- Lates calcarifer (Bloch, 1790)

Synonyms
- List: Holocentrus calcarifer Bloch, 1790; Coius vacti F. Hamilton, 1822; Pseudolates cavifrons Alleyne & W. J. Macleay, 1877; Lates darwiniensis W. J. Macleay, 1878; Lateolabrax japonicus (non Cuvier, 1828)

= Barramundi =

Species of fish

The barramundi (Lates calcarifer), Asian sea bass, Asian sea lates, giant sea lates, or giant sea perch (also known as dangri, kalanji, apahap, siakap, or chonok) is a species of catadromous fish in the family Latidae of the order Carangiformes. The species is widely distributed in the Indo-West Pacific, spanning the waters of the Middle East, South Asia, Southeast Asia, East Asia, and Oceania.

== Etymology ==
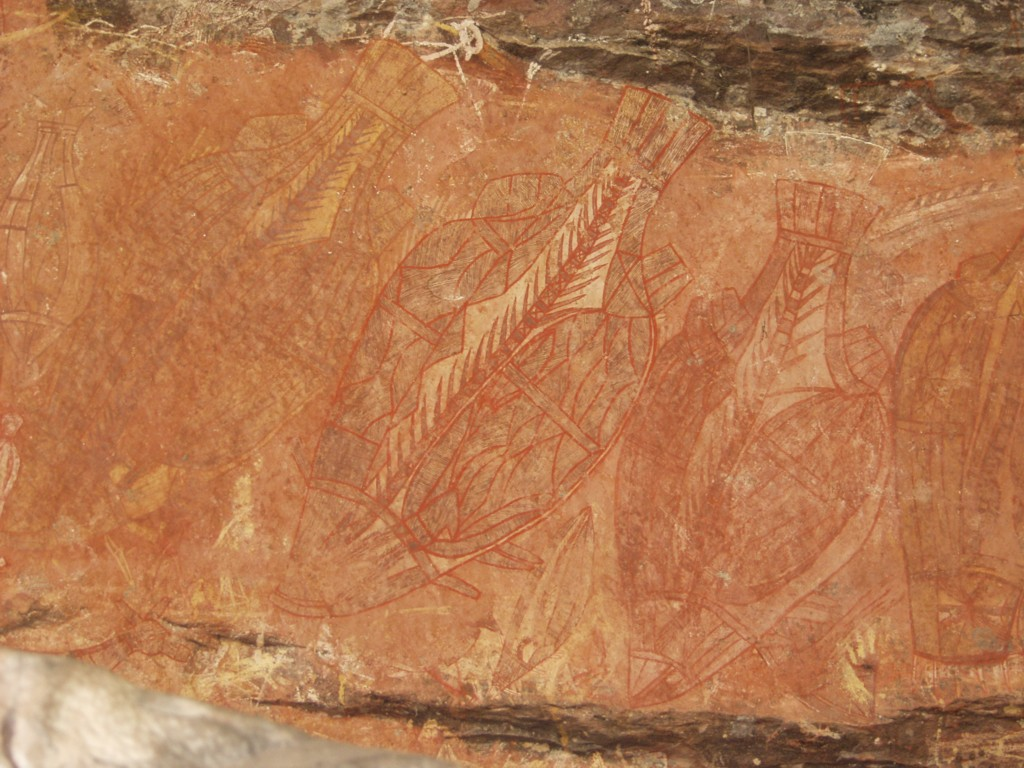
Indigenous Australian rock art depicting barramundi

Barramundi is a loanword from an Australian Aboriginal language of the Rockhampton area in Queensland meaning "large-scaled river fish". Originally, the name barramundi referred to Scleropages leichardti and Scleropages jardinii.

However, the name was appropriated for marketing reasons during the 1980s, a decision that significantly raised the profile of this fish. L. calcarifer is broadly referred to as Asian seabass by the international scientific community, but is sometimes known as Australian seabass or giant sea perch.

== Description ==
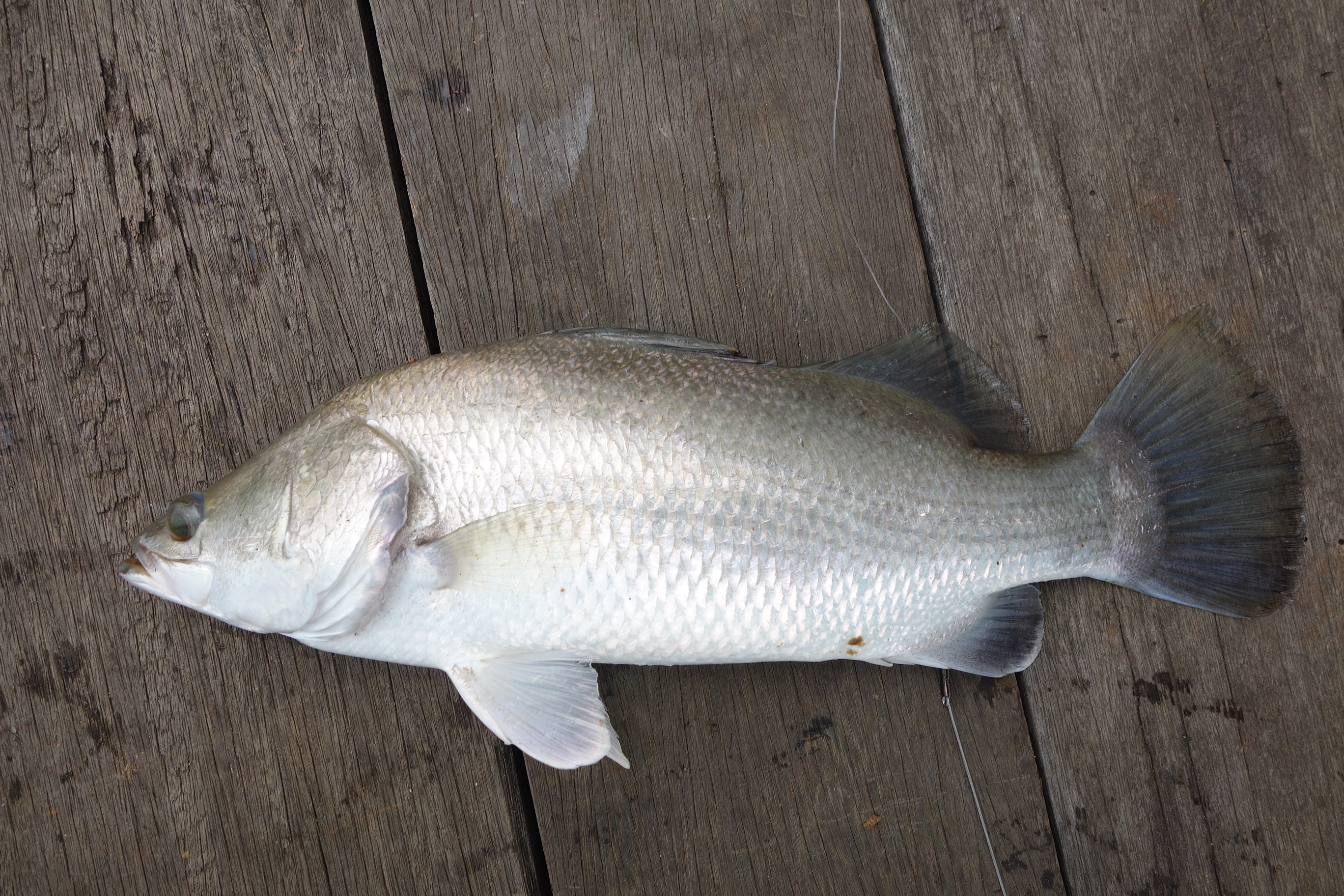
In Indonesia

This species has a very elongated body form with a large, slightly oblique mouth and an upper jaw extending behind the eye. The lower edge of the preoperculum is serrated with a strong spine at its angle; the operculum has a small spine and a serrated flap above the origin of the lateral line. Its scales are ctenoid. In cross section, the fish is compressed and the dorsal head profile clearly concave. The single dorsal and ventral fins have spines and soft rays; the paired pectoral and pelvic fins have soft rays only; and the caudal fin has soft rays and is truncated and rounded. Barramundi are salt and freshwater sportfish, targeted by many. They have large, silver scales, which may become darker or lighter, depending on their environments. Their bodies can reach up to 1.8 m (5.9 ft) long, though evidence of them being caught at this size is scarce. The maximum weight is about 60 kg (130 lb). The average length is about 0.6–1.2 m (2.0–3.9 ft). Its genome size is about 700 Mb, which was sequenced and published in Animal Genetics (2015, in press) by James Cook University.

== Biology ==
Barramundi are demersal, inhabiting coastal waters, estuaries, lagoons, and rivers; they are found in clear to turbid water, usually within a temperature range of 26−30 °C. This species does not undertake extensive migrations within or between river systems, which has presumably influenced establishment of genetically distinct stocks in Northern Australia.

The barramundi feeds on crustaceans, molluscs, and smaller fish (including its own species); juveniles feed on zooplankton. The barramundi is euryhaline, but stenothermal. It inhabits rivers and descends to estuaries and tidal flats to spawn. In areas remote from fresh water, purely marine populations may become established.

=== Reproduction ===
At the start of the monsoon, males migrate downriver to meet females, which lay very large numbers of eggs (several millions each). The adults do not guard the eggs or the fry, which require brackish water to develop. The species is sequentially hermaphroditic, with most individuals maturing as males and becoming female after at least one spawning season; most of the larger specimens are therefore female. Fish held in captivity sometimes demonstrate features atypical of fish in the wild; they change sex at a smaller size, exhibit a higher proportion of protogyny and some males do not undergo sexual inversion.

== Commercial fishing and aquaculture ==
The fish is of commercial importance; it is fished internationally and raised in aquaculture in Australia, Saudi Arabia, Malaysia, India, Indonesia, Vietnam, Israel, Thailand, the United States, Poland, and the United Kingdom.

The Australian barramundi industry is relatively established, with an annual production of more than 9,000 tons. In the broader Southeast Asian region, production is estimated to exceed 30,000 tons. A joint venture between a Sri Lankan company, Oceanpick (Pvt) Ltd, and a Scottish fish farm has been ocean farming barramundi sustainably in Sri Lanka since 2012, using the deep waters of Trincomalee Bay, on the island's northeast coast.

Barramundi under culture commonly grow from a hatchery juvenile, between 50 and 100 mm in length, to a table size of 400–600 g within 12 months and to 3.0 kg within 18–24 months.

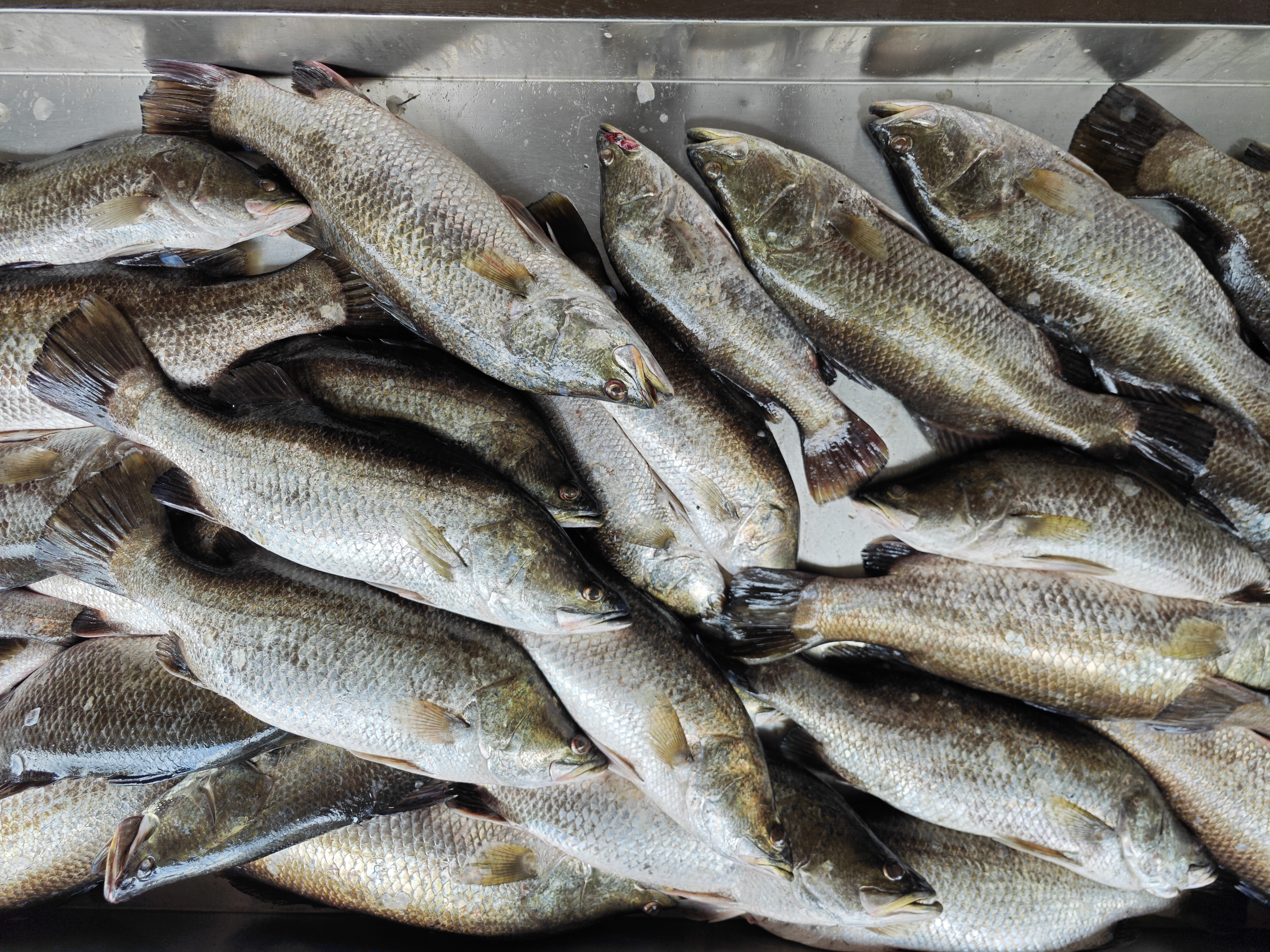
Freshly caught kalanji from the brackish waters of the Periyar River of Kerala, India arrive in the local market

Capture (blue) and aquaculture (green) production of giant seaperch=(Lates calcarifer) in thousand tonnes from 1950 to 2022, reported by the FAO

Live barramundi for sale at a T&T supermarket, in Vancouver

== Recreational fishing ==
Prized by anglers and sport-fishing enthusiasts for their good fighting ability, barramundi are reputed to be good at avoiding fixed nets and are best caught on lines and with fishing lures. In Australia, the barramundi is used to stock freshwater reservoirs for recreational fishing.

These "impoundment barramundi", as they are known by anglers, have grown in popularity as a "catch and release" fish. Popular stocked barramundi impoundments include Lake Tinaroo near Cairns in the Atherton Tablelands, Lake Proserpine west of Proserpine, Queensland, Teemburra Dam near Mackay, Lake Moondarra near Mount Isa, Lake Awoonga near Gladstone, and Lake Monduran south of Lake Awoonga.

Recreational barramundi fishing particularly popular in Australia's Northern Territory where anglers fish in rivers, estuaries and coastal waters. It is commonly undertaken from boats or the shoreline and is often associated with seasonal patterns that influence access and fishing conditions. It is also linked to tourism and local events, including the annual Million Dollar Fish competition, which offers prize money for catching tagged barramundi.

== Aquarium use ==
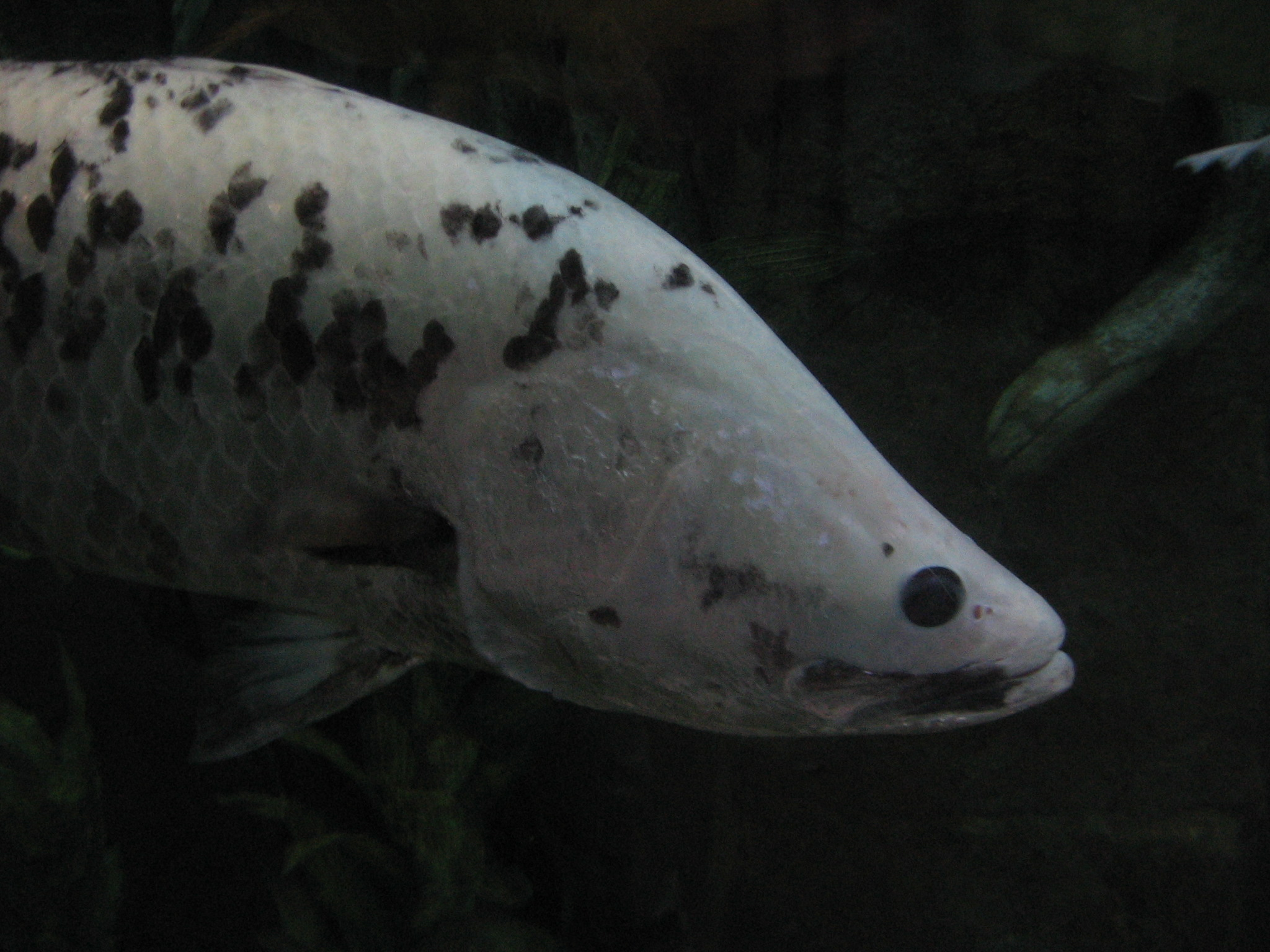
Piebald colour morph

These fish are not generally kept in home aquaria. They may be confused with an Australian reef fish commonly called the humpback grouper (Cromileptes altivelis), also known as barramundi cod, panther grouper, or polkadot grouper, juveniles of which are frequently offered for sale in the ornamental fish trade. However, they rapidly outgrow most home aquariums.

== In cuisine ==
Barramundi have a mild flavour and a white, flaky flesh, with varying amount of body fat.

Barramundi are a favourite food of the region's apex predator, saltwater crocodiles, which have been known to take them from unwary fishermen.

=== Australian cuisine ===
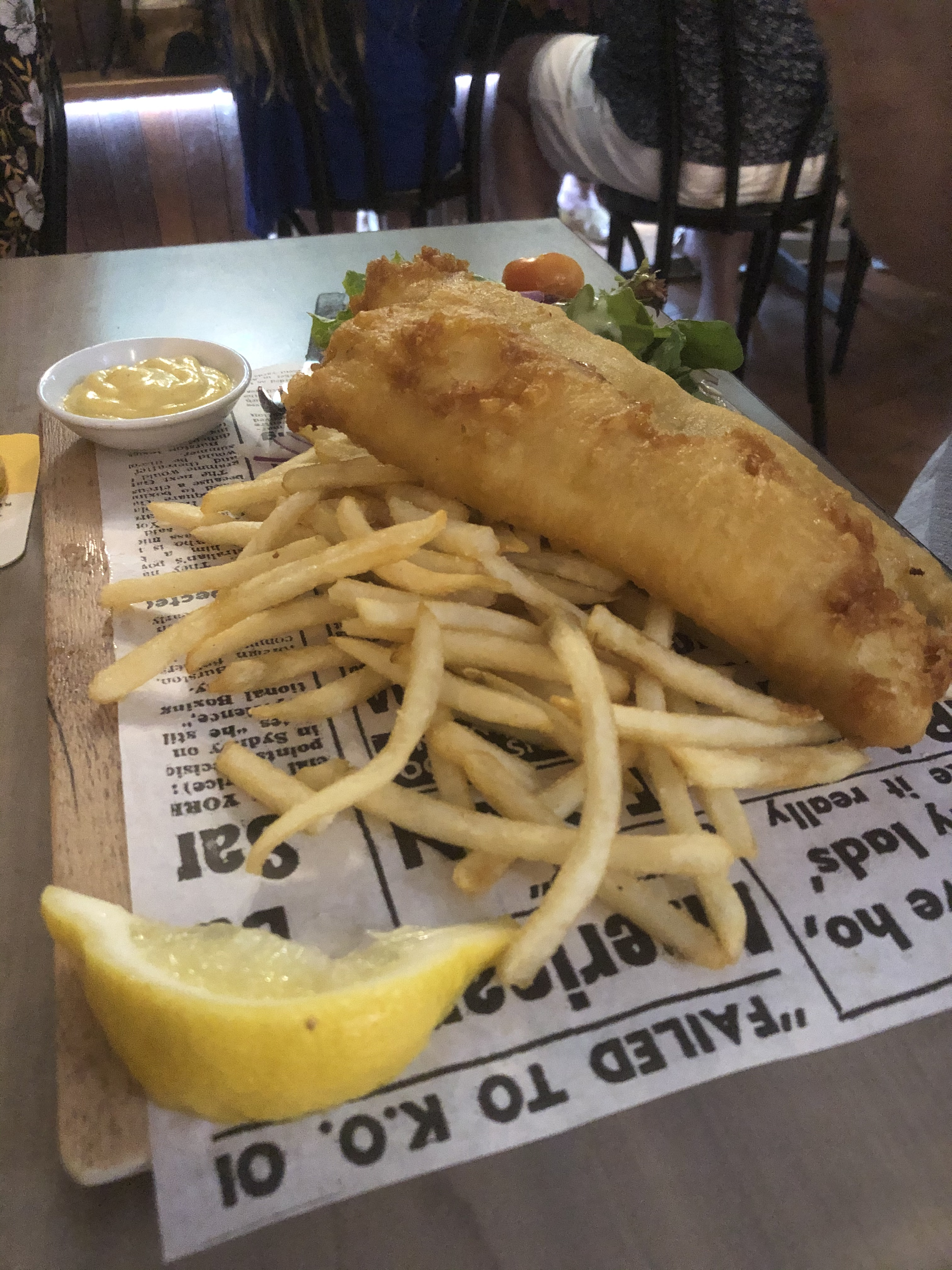
Barramundi and chips in Noosaville, Queensland

In Australia, such is the demand for the fish that a substantial amount of barramundi consumed there is actually imported. This has placed economic pressure on Australian producers, both fishers and farmers, whose costs are greater due to remoteness of many of the farming and fishing sites, as well as stringent environmental and food safety standards placed on them by the government. While country-of-origin labelling has given consumers greater certainty over the origins of their barramundi at the retail level, there have been changes to align food labelling standards to food service outlets with regard to barramundi.

=== Bengali cuisine ===
Barramundi, known as "Deshi Bhetki" (Bengali : দেশি ভেটকি) or "Koral" (Bengali: কোরাল), is a popular fish among Bengali people, mainly served in festivities such as marriages and other important social events. It is cooked as bhetki machher paturi, bhetki machher kalia, or coated in crumbled biscuit (similar to golden bread crumbs) and pan fried. It is very popular among people who are usually sceptical about eating fish with a lot of bones. Bhetki fillets have no bones in them. In Bengali cuisine, therefore, fried bhetki fillets are popular and considered to be of good quality. The dish is commonly called "fish fry" or "fish cutlet" or bhetkir cutlet.

=== Goan cuisine ===
Locally caught chonak (barramundi) is a favourite food, prepared with either recheado (a Goan red masala) or coated with rava (sooji, semolina) and pan fried. The fish is generally filleted on the diagonal. It is eaten as a snack or as an accompaniment to drinks or the main course. It is one of the more expensive fish available.

=== Thai cuisine ===
Barramundi from local fish farms are known as pla kapong (Thai: ปลากะพง) in Thailand. Since its introduction, it has become one of the most popular fish in Thai cuisine. It is often eaten steamed with lime and garlic, as well as deep-fried or stir-fried with lemongrass, among a variety of many other ways. Pla kapong can be seen in aquaria in many restaurants in Thailand, where sometimes this fish is wrongly labelled as "snapper" or "sea bass" on menus. Traditionally, Lutjanidae snappers were known as pla kapong before the introduction of barramundi in Thai aquaculture, but presently, snapper is rarely served in restaurants in the main cities and in interior Thailand.

=== North America ===
In the US, barramundi is growing in popularity. Monterey Bay Aquarium has deemed US and Vietnam-raised barramundi as "Best Choice" under the Seafood Watch sustainability program.

One barramundi farm is present in Canada as of 2023, located in Alberta.

== See also ==
- Japanese lates, also known as Japanese barramundi
- Nile perch, also known as African barramundi
- Murray cod
