= Sakamoto Ryōma Memorial Museum =

Museum in Katsurahama, Kōchi, Japan

- 高知県立坂本龍馬記念館
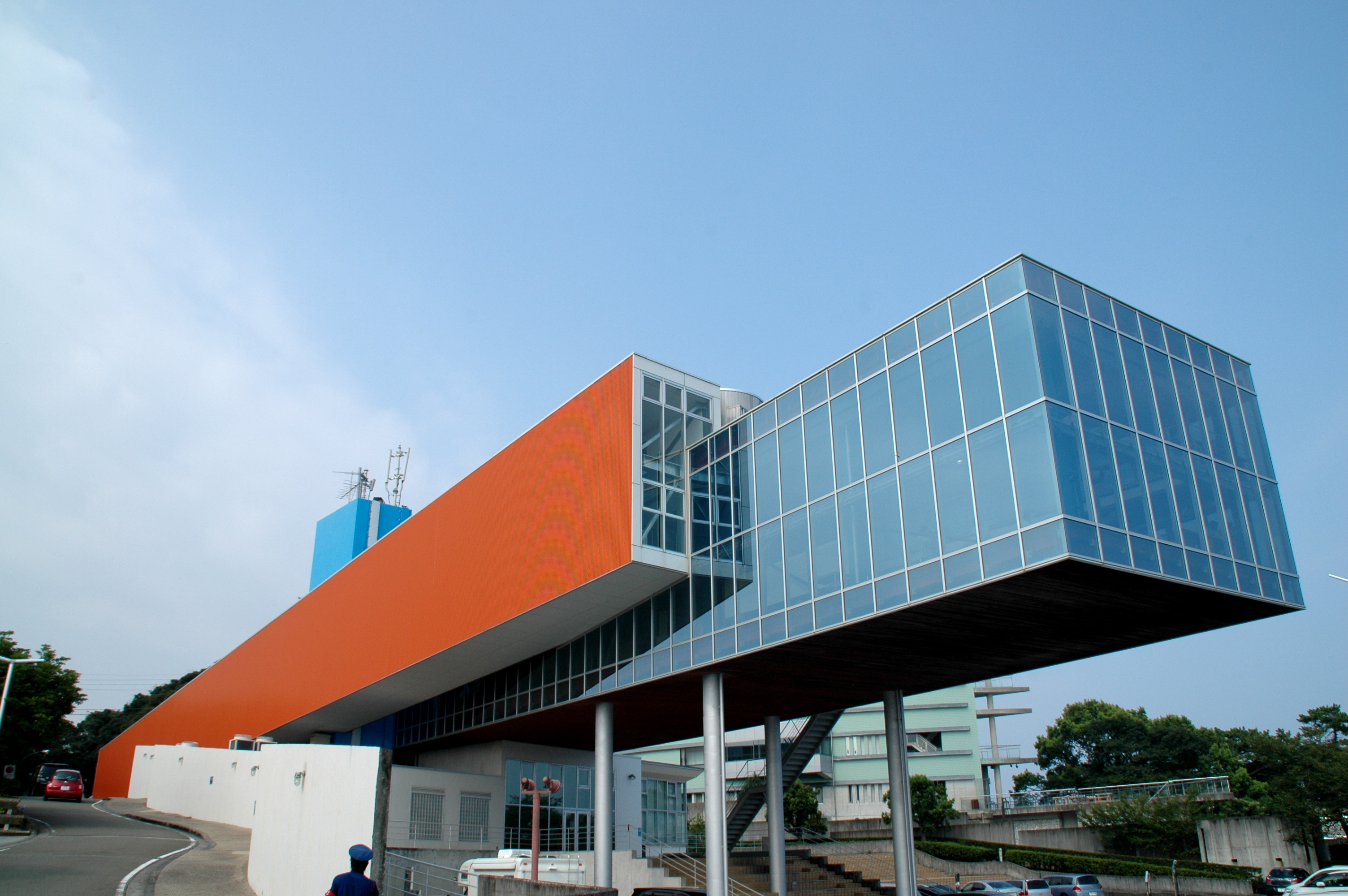
- View from Sea Side of Sakamoto Ryoma Memorial Museum

- Sakamoto Ryōma Memorial Museum Sakamoto Ryōma Memorial Museum (Japan)
- Established: 15 November 1991
- Location: 830 Urato, Kōchi-shi, Kōchi-ken 781-0262
- Coordinates: 33°29′47.1″N 133°34′18.6″E
- Website: ryoma-kinenkan.jp/country/en/
- Map

The Sakamoto Ryōma Memorial Museum (高知県立坂本龍馬記念館, Kōchi kenritsu Sakamoto Ryōma kinenkan) opened in the grounds of the former Urado Castle in Katsurahama, Kōchi, Japan on 15 November 1991. The collection includes correspondence and other documents by Sakamoto Ryōma and his contemporaries and there is also a library of over two thousand books relating to the Meiji Restoration.

== Access ==
The museum can be accessed via the Katsurahama Line Tosaden bus route.

== See also ==
- Bakumatsu
- Ryōma's Birthplace Memorial Museum
