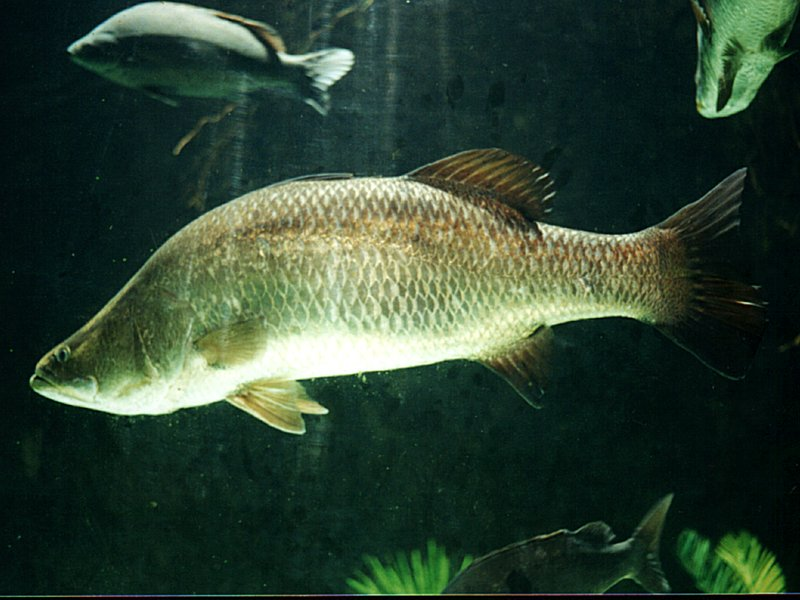
- Barramundi (L. calcarifer)

Scientific classification
- Kingdom: Animalia
- Phylum: Chordata
- Class: Actinopterygii
- Order: Carangiformes
- Suborder: Centropomoidei
- Family: Latidae; D. S. Jordan, 1888

Genera
- see text

= Latidae =

Latidae Temporal range: Early Eocene to present

Family of ray-finned fishes

The Latidae, known as the lates perches, are a family of perch-like fish found in Africa, Asia, and the Indian and western Pacific Oceans. Including about 13 species, the family, previously classified subfamily Latinae in family Centropomidae, was raised to family status in 2004 after a cladistic analysis showed the original Centropomidae were paraphyletic.

The Latidae are characterised by having dorsal fins that are incompletely separated, or if they are separated, a few isolated spines will be found between the anterior and posterior parts of the fin. Their caudal fin is normally rounded. All species have a vertebral column made up of 25 vertebrae.

Many species in this family are important food fishes, and some have been introduced outside their native ranges to provide fishing stocks. The freshwater Nile perch, a fierce predator, has become infamous, as its introduction into Lake Victoria in the 1950s has wrought devastation on the native fishes of the lake, causing the extinction of many endemic cichlids there.

== Genera ==
The Latidae contain three extant and one to two extinct genera:

- ?†Boreolates Weems, 2021
- †Eolates Sorbini, 1970
- Hypopterus Gill, 1861
- Lates Cuvier, 1828
- Psammoperca Richardson, 1848

† denotes that this taxon is extinct
