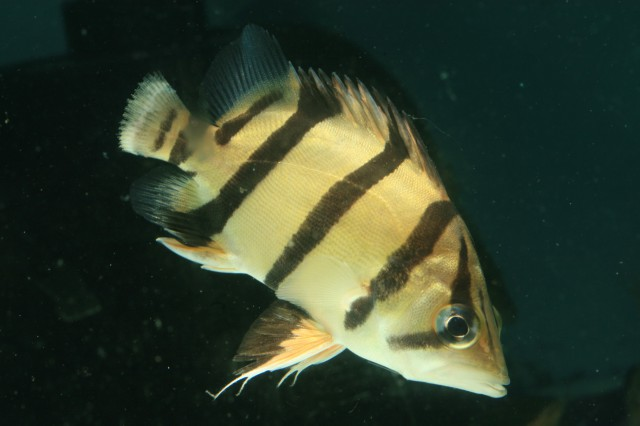

Conservation status
- Vulnerable (IUCN 3.1)

Scientific classification
- Kingdom: Animalia
- Phylum: Chordata
- Class: Actinopterygii
- Order: Acanthuriformes
- Family: Lobotidae
- Genus: Datnioides
- Species: D. undecimradiatus

Binomial name
- Datnioides undecimradiatus (Roberts & Kottelat, 1994)

Synonyms
- Coius undecimradiatus Roberts & Kottelat, 1994

= Datnioides undecimradiatus =

Species of fish

Datnioides undecimradiatus, the Mekong tiger perch is a species of freshwater fish belonging to the family Lobotidae, the triplefins and tiger perches. This species is endemic to the lower and middle Mekong basin in Indochina.

== Taxonomy ==
Datnioides undecimradiatus was first formally described as Coius undecimradiatus in 1994 by the ichthyologists Tyson R. Roberts and Maurice Kottelat with its type locality given as the Mekong River, a few kilometres downstream from the Lee Pee (or Khone) waterfalls in Laos. In 2000 Kottelat determined that the type species of the genus Coius, Coius cobojius, was a junior synonym of Anabas testudineus so Coius is a junior synonym of Anabas, with Datnioides being the correct name for the tiger perch genus. The 5th edition of the Fishes of the World classifies this genus as one of two genera in the family Lobotidae, alongside the tripletails in the genus Lobotes, which it places in the order Spariformes.

== Etymology ==
Datnioides undecimradiatus has the specific name undecimradiatus, meaning "eleven rayed", a reference to the typical number of soft rays in the anal fin.

== Description ==
Datnioides undecimradiatus has the toothless palatine and vomer characteristic of the tiger perches, as is the rounded caudal fin is rounded and rounded lobes on the anal and second dorsal fins creating the appearance of having three caudal fins. The dorsal fin is supported by 12 spines and between 16 and 19 soft rays while the anal fin contains 3 spines and 11 or 12 soft rays. The depth of the body is just under half of the standard length. The body is marked with four relatively slender dark bars which do not normally extend as far as the ventral surface of the body. This species has a maximum published standard length of 40 cm (16 in).

== Distribution and habitat ==
Datnioides undecimradiatus is endemic to the lower Mekong Basin of Mainland Southeast Asia and is found in Thailand, Cambodia, Laos and Vietnam. It is a predatory species which occurs in both main channels of rivers and their tributaries.

== Conservation ==
Datnioides undecimradiatus is caught for food and the aquarium trade. Almost all the fish in the aquarium trade are wild caught juveniles, although Indonesian aquarists may have successfully bred this species in captivity. They are rare and sought after as aquarium fish and command high prices. The Mekong tiger perch has been overexploited within its range, especially in Thailand, and the population ha significantly declined leading the IUCN to assess its status as Vulnerable.
