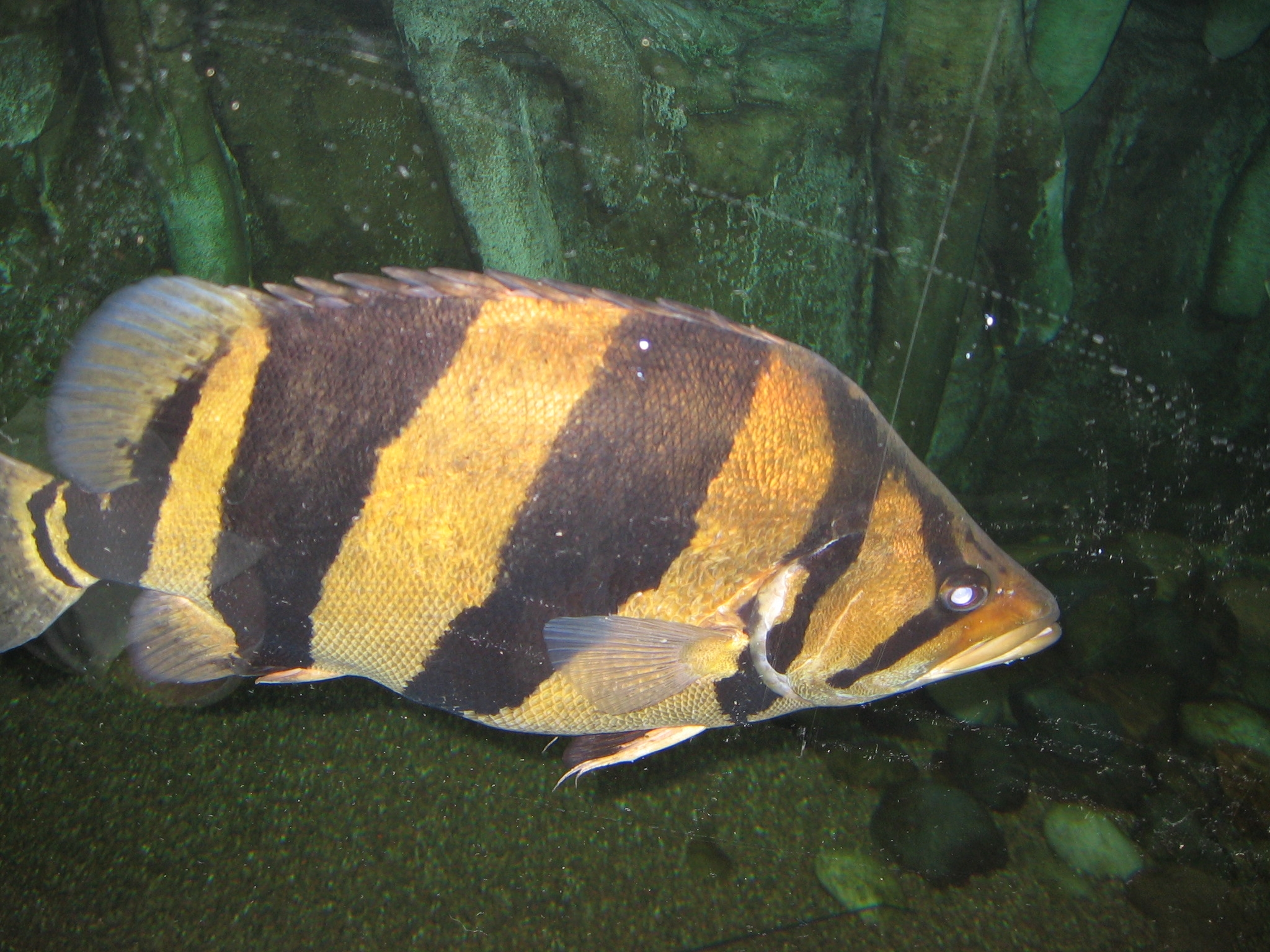

Conservation status
- Critically Endangered (IUCN 3.1)

Scientific classification
- Kingdom: Animalia
- Phylum: Chordata
- Class: Actinopterygii
- Order: Acanthuriformes
- Family: Lobotidae
- Genus: Datnioides
- Species: D. pulcher

Binomial name
- Datnioides pulcher (Kottelat, 1998)

Synonyms
- Coius pulcher Kottelat, 1998

= Siamese tigerfish =

Species of fish

The Siamese tigerfish (Datnioides pulcher), also known as the Siamese tiger perch, is a species of ray-finned fish belonging to the family Lobotidae, the tripletails and tiger perches. This fish is endemic to Indochina and is assessed as Critically Endangered by the IUCN.

== Taxonomy ==
The Siamese tigerfish was first formally described as Coius pulcher in 1998 by the Swiss ichthyologist Maurice Kottelat with its type locality given as Bung Borapet in Thailand. Following his description of C. pulcher Kottelat determined that the type species of the genus Coius, Coius cobojius, was a junior synonym of Anabas testudineus so Coius is a junior synonym of Anabas, with Datnioides being the correct name for the tiger perch genus. The Siamese tigerfish and the finescale tiger perch (D. microlepis) were considered to be conspecific as D. microlepis until Kottelat described D. pulcher. The 5th edition of the Fishes of the World classifies this genus as one of two genera in the family Lobotidae, alongside the tripletails in the genus Lobotes, which it places in the order Spariformes.

== Etymology ==
The Siamese tigerfish has the specific name pulcher, meaning "beautiful", a choice Kottelat did not explain but is thought to be an allusion to its barred colour pattern.

== Description ==
The Siamese tigerfish has the toothless palatine and vomer characteristic of the tiger perches, as is the rounded caudal fin is rounded and rounded lobes on the anal and second dorsal fins creating the appearance of having three caudal fins. This species has 4, occasionally 5, wide vertical bars on the orange-brown body. The first bar runs from the nape over the operculum and onto the thorax and around the lower surface of the body, the second starts at the base of the spiny part of the dorsal fin to immediately in front of the origin of the anal fin, the thirds extends from the join of the spint and sift rayed parts of the dorsal in to the soft rayed part of the anal fin and the fourth bar is on the rear part of the caudal peduncle. The area of the back in front of the origin of the dorsal fin is straight. This species has a maximum published standard length of 40 cm (16 in).

== Distribution and habitat ==
The Siamese tigerfish is endemic to Indochina where it is found in the basins of the Mekong and Chao Praya rivers, east to the middle and lower Mekong in Laos, Cambodia and Vietnam. It has been extirpated from Thailand. This is a freshwater fish found in the main rivers, tributaries and lakes connected to rivers. It prefers areas with submerged wood and rocks with crevices.

== Biology ==
The Siamese tigerfish is a predatory species, fish and shrimp make up most of its diet.

== Conservation ==
The Siamese tigerfish was targeted by fishers as a food fish in Thailand and Cambodia but was a valued aquarium fish and was mainly fished for export in this trade. This, combined with damming of the watercourses it lives in, has caused drastic declines in its population. It has been locally extinct in Thailand since the 1990s and only Vietnam, occasionally exports live specimens into the trade. The IUCN assess this species as Critically Endangered. There have been attempts to breed this fish in captivity.

== See also ==
- List of brackish aquarium fish species
- Brackish-water aquarium
