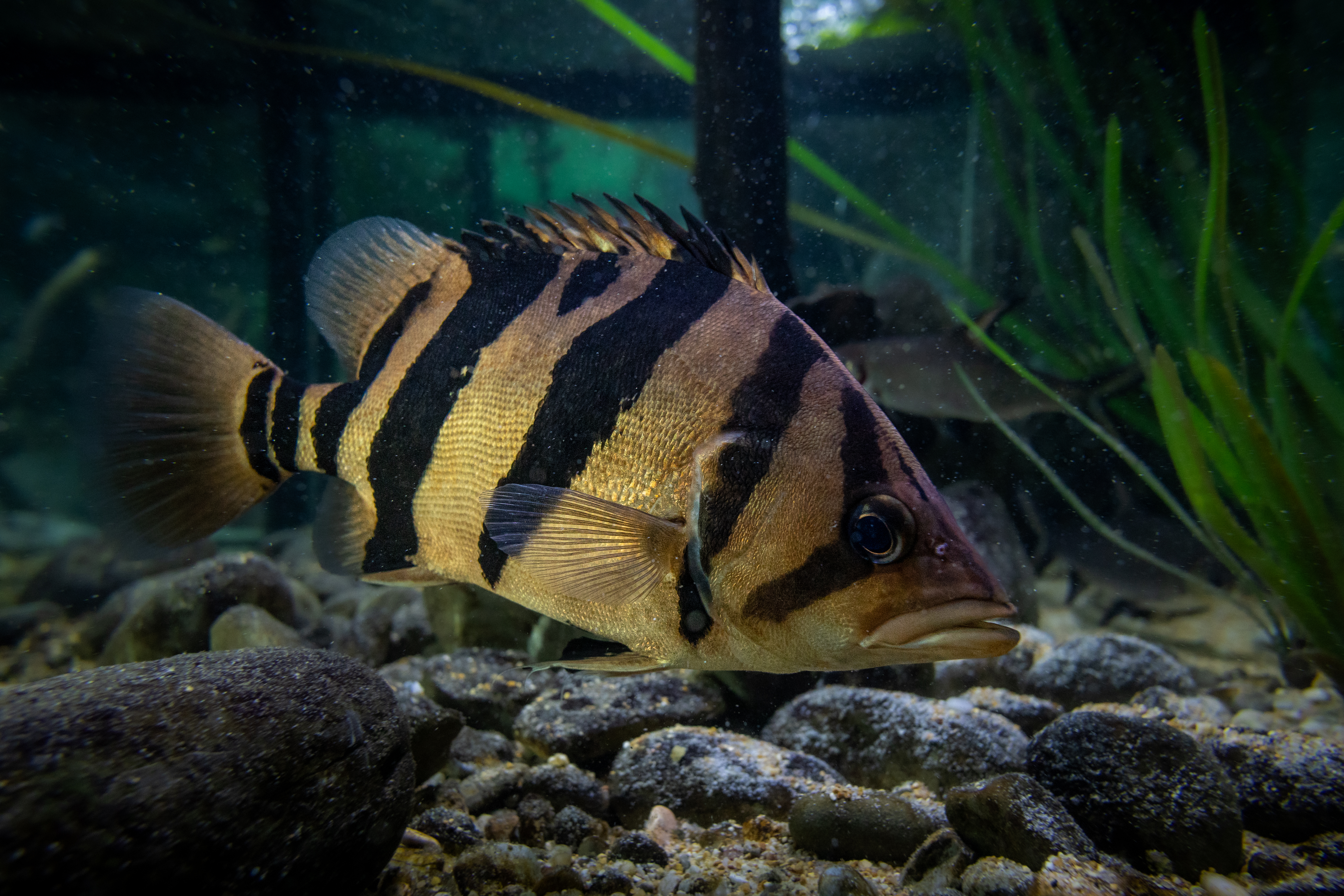
- Captive

Conservation status
- Least Concern (IUCN 3.1)

Scientific classification
- Kingdom: Animalia
- Phylum: Chordata
- Class: Actinopterygii
- Division: Teleostei
- Order: Acanthuriformes
- Family: Lobotidae
- Genus: Datnioides
- Species: D. microlepis

Binomial name
- Datnioides microlepis Bleeker, 1854

Synonyms
- Coius microlepis (Bleeker, 1854)

= Datnioides microlepis =

Species of fish

Datnioides microlepis, also known as the Indonesian tiger perch, Indo datnoid, Indonesian tigerfish, or finescale tigerfish, or Ikan Ringau is a species of freshwater ray-finned fish belonging to the family Lobotidae, the tripletails and tiger perches. This species is endemic to the Malay Peninsula, as well as the islands of Sumatra and Borneo.

== Taxonomy ==
Datnioides microlepis was first formally described in 1854 by the Dutch physician, herpetologist and ichthyologist Pieter Bleeker with its type locality given as the Kapuas River at Pontianak, Kalimantan, Indonesia. This taxon was considered to be conspecific with the Siamese tigerfish (D. pulcher), which was included in D. microlepis until 1998. The 5th edition of the Fishes of the World classifies this genus as one of two genera in the family Lobotidae, alongside the tripletails in the genus Lobotes, which it places in the order Spariformes.

== Etymology ==
Datnioides microlepis has the specific name microlepis which means "small scales", an allusion to the smaller scales of this species compared to D. polota.

== Description ==
Datnioides microlepis has the deepest body of the species in the genus Datnioides, its standard length being 2.1 to 2.4 times its depth. The maximum published total length for this species is 65 cm (26 in), and it comes from South Sumatra making it the largest species of Datnioides. It may be identified from its congeners by having 6 or 7 broad dark vertical bars on the body, with a yellowish-grey background colour. The band nearest the head typically runs unbroken over the operculum and over the throat. There is an obvious black marking just in front of the base of the pelvic fin. The part of the back in front of the dorsal fin is straight.

== Distribution and habitat ==
Datnioides microlepis is found in the Malay Peninsula, Sumatra, and western Kalimantan on Borneo. They inhabit large lowland rivers and at times enters brackish waters. It prefers flooded forests, especially areas with an abundance of submerged branches. Records of this species from the drainage basins of the Chao Praya and Mekong are thought to refer to the Siamese tigerfish (Datnioides pulcher).

== Biology ==
Datnioides microlepis is a predatory species, adults feed on crustaceans and smaller fishes, as well as annelids and insects, while juveniles feed on zooplankton. Adults are solitary and aggressive to other members of its species while the juveniles will gather in groups. In the Kapuas river, the local fishermen have observed that this species spawns in April and May.

== Utilisation ==
Datnioides microlepis is a food fish and overfishing, as well as pollution, threaten the populations in some areas. It is a rare item in the aquarium trade.
