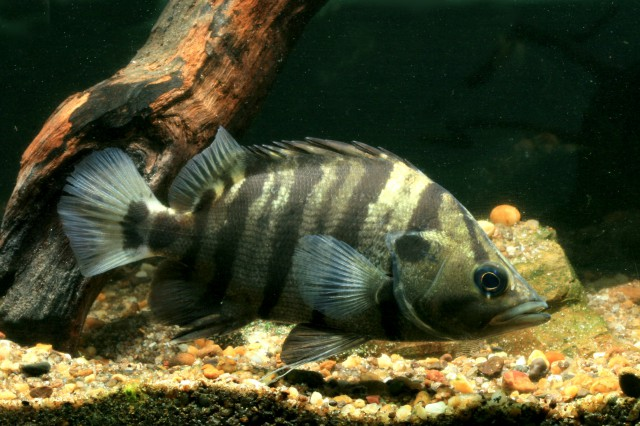

Conservation status
- Least Concern (IUCN 3.1)

Scientific classification
- Kingdom: Animalia
- Phylum: Chordata
- Class: Actinopterygii
- Order: Acanthuriformes
- Family: Lobotidae
- Genus: Datnioides
- Species: D. polota

Binomial name
- Datnioides polota (Hamilton, 1822)

Synonyms
- Coius polota Hamilton, 1822; Coius quadrifasciatus (Sevastianof, 1809); Datnioides quadrifasciatus (Sevastianof, 1809); Chaetodon quadrifasciatus Sevastianoff, 1809; Coius binotatus J. E. Gray, 1834; Lobotes hexazona Bleeker, 1850

= Datnioides polota =

Species of fish

Datnioides polota, the silver tigerfish, silver tiger perch, barred tigerfish, four-banded tripletail, four-banded tigerfish or four-barred tigerfish, is a species of ray-finned fish belonging to the family Lobotidae, the tripletails and tiger perches. This fish is found in southern Asia and New Guinea.

== Taxonomy ==
Datnioides polota was first formally described as Coius polota by the Scottish geographer and naturalist Francis Buchanan-Hamilton with its type locality given as the estuaries of the River Ganges in India. In 1853 Pieter Bleeker proposed the genus Datnioides and in 1876 he designated D. polota as its type species. In 2000 Maurice Kottelat determined that the type species of the genus Coius, Coius cobojius, was a junior synonym of Anabas testudineus so Coius is a junior synonym of Anabas, with Datnioides being the correct name for the tiger perch genus. The 5th edition of the Fishes of the World classifies this genus as one of two genera in the family Lobotidae, alongside the tripletails in the genus Lobotes, which it places in the order Spariformes.

== Etymology ==
Datnioides polota has a specific name, polota, which Hamilton did not explain. It is thought to be a local name for this fish in the Ganges of India.

== Description ==
Datnioides polota has its dorsal fin supported by 12 spines and 13 or 14 soft rays while the anal fin contains 3 spones and 8 or 9 soft rays. The maximum published standard length of this species is 30 cm (12 in), although 18 cm (7.1 in) is more typical. The colour and pattern is very variable and they can have up to seven broad dark vertical bars on the body, sometimes with between 1 and 4 thinner, incomplete bars between them. The area of the back in front of the origin of the dorsal fin is concave.

== Distribution and habitat ==
Datnioides polota is found in southern Asia, where it occurs from eastern India and Bangladesh east through Indochina and Indonesia to New Guinea. This fish occurs in the brackish waters of tidal lagoons and estuaries and also in freshwater rivers and lakes beyond the influence of the tide.

== Biology ==
Datnioides polota is a predatory fish, feeding on other fishes, crustaceans and aquatic insect larvae. A study of this species in the Musi River on Sumatra states these fishes appear to breed all year round and spawn in small batches each time, i.e. they are partial spawners.

== Utilisation ==
Datnioides polota is caught as a food fish and occasionally appears in the aquarium trade.
