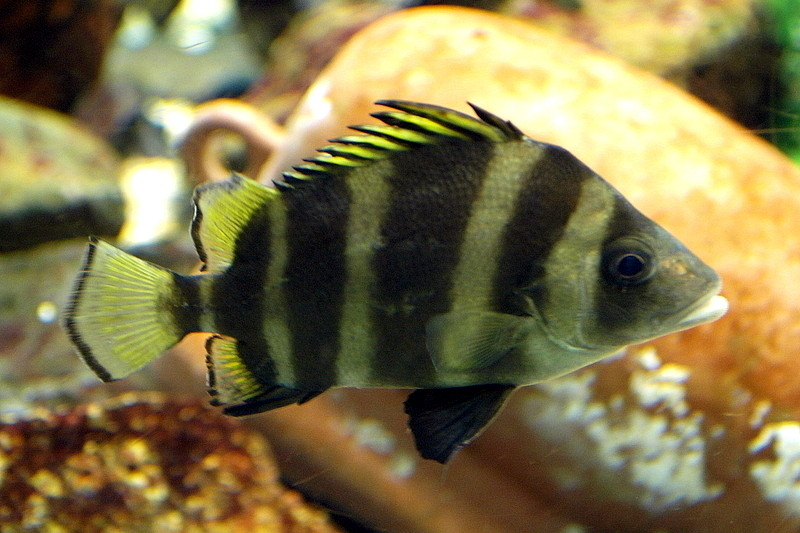
- Broad-banded velvetchin (H. analis)

Scientific classification
- Kingdom: Animalia
- Phylum: Chordata
- Class: Actinopterygii
- Division: Teleostei
- Order: Acanthuriformes
- Family: Lobotidae
- Genus: Hapalogenys; Richardson, 1844

Type species
- Hapalogenys nitens Richardson, 1844

= Hapalogenys =

Genus of fishes

Hapalogenys, the barbeled grunters or velveltchins, is a genus of marine ray-finned fish. The species of this genus are found in depths between 30–230 m (98–755 ft) in coastal areas and river mouths from the shores of southern Japan to the Bay of Bengal and Northwestern Australia.

== Etymology ==
Hapalogenys is a compound of hapalos, meaning "soft", and genys, meaning "chin". Sir John Richardson, who erected this genus, stated that this referred to "velvety softness of the chin and lower lip, which is made more conspicuous by contrast with the rigidly rough scales that cover the rest of the head".

== Taxonomy ==
The type species of the genus is Hapalogenys nitens, which was described by Sir John Richardson in 1844; it was designated as such by Pieter Bleeker in 1876. H. nitens was later found to be a junior synonym of Pogonias nigripinnis Temminck & Schlegel, 1843; now this species is formally known as Hapalogenys nigripinnis. The 5th edition of Fishes of the World places this genus in the monotypic Hapalogeynidae (within the order Perciformes), and it is noted there that the family is in a clade of seven families, and hence is probably close to the Acanthuroidei, the Monodactylidae and the Priacanthidae. Other authorities place the genus in the family Lobotidae (along with Lobotes and Datnioides), in the order Acanthuriformes.

== Characteristics ==
Species in this genus have laterally compressed bodies. They have 10 pores on and to the rear of the chin, including a pair of tiny pores near the symphysis. The lower jaw and chin have dense clusters of short barbels. They have small teeth which are arranged in bands on the jaws, vomer, and palatines. They have 7 branchiostegal rays supporting the gill membranes. The dorsal fin contain 11 spines and 13–15 soft rays, while the anal fin has 3 spines and 8–9 soft rays. The caudal fin is rounded. Hapalogenys nigripinnis is the largest species, attaining a maximum standard length of 40 cm (16 in).

== Species ==
There are currently 8 recognized species in this genus:

- Hapalogenys analis Richardson, 1845 (Broad-banded velvetchin)
- Hapalogenys bengalensis Mohapatra, Ray & Kumar, 2013
- Hapalogenys dampieriensis Iwatsuki & Russell, 2006 (Australian striped velvetchin)
- Hapalogenys filamentosus Iwatsuki & Russell, 2006 (Philippine dark velvetchin)
- Hapalogenys kishinouyei Smith & Pope, 1906 (Lined javelinfish)
- Hapalogenys merguiensis Iwatsuki, Satapoomin & Amaoka, 2000 (Mergui velvetchin)
- Hapalogenys nigripinnis (Temminck & Schlegel, 1843) (Short-barbeled velvetchin)
- Hapalogenys sennin Iwatsuki & Nakabo, 2005 (Long-barbeled grunter)

== Human interactions ==
Some species in this genus are consumed in East Asia.
