= Tigerfish =

Tigerfish predominantly refers to various species of fish:

Species referred to as tigerfish

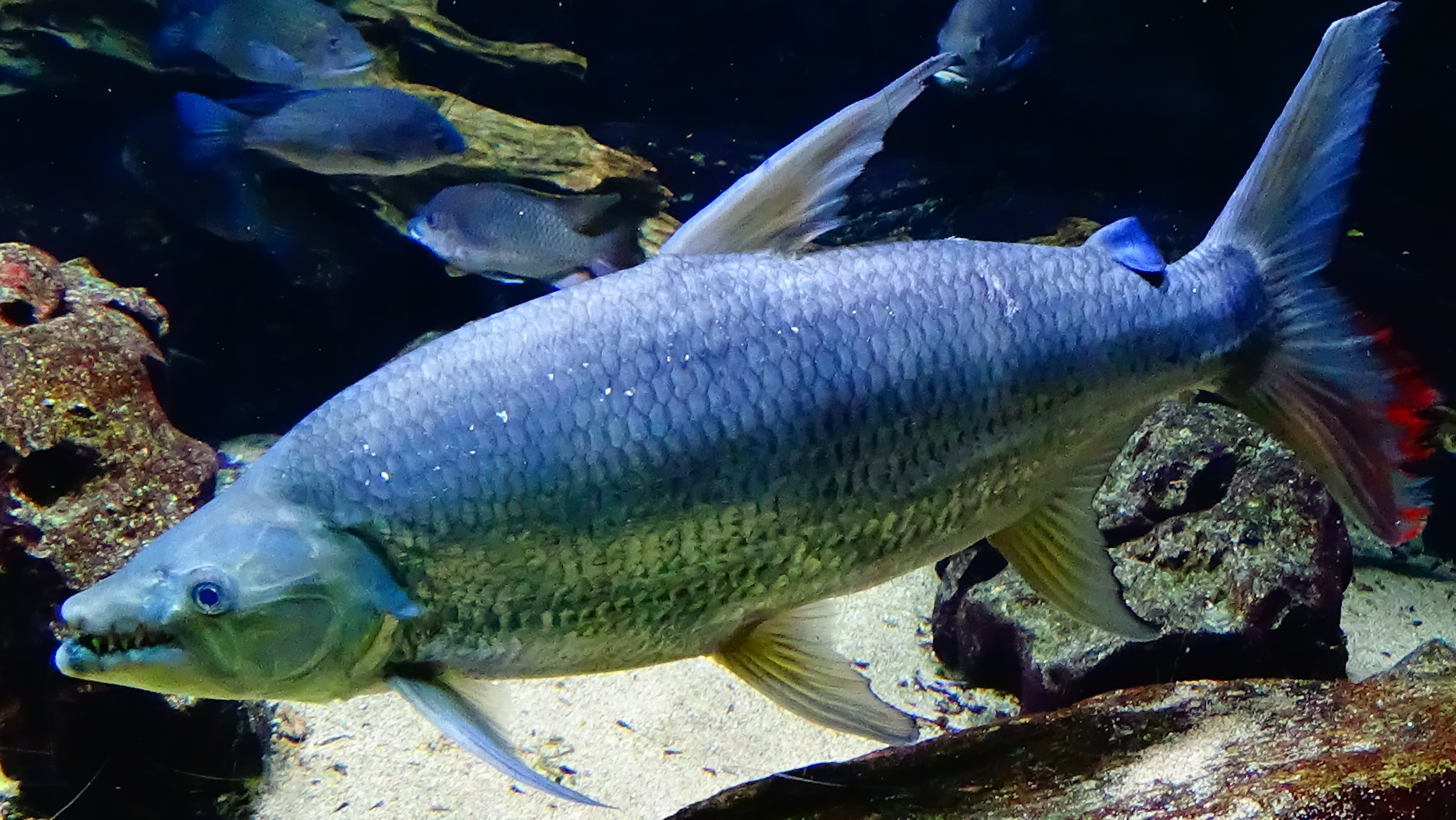
Goliath tigerfish (Hydrocynus goliath)

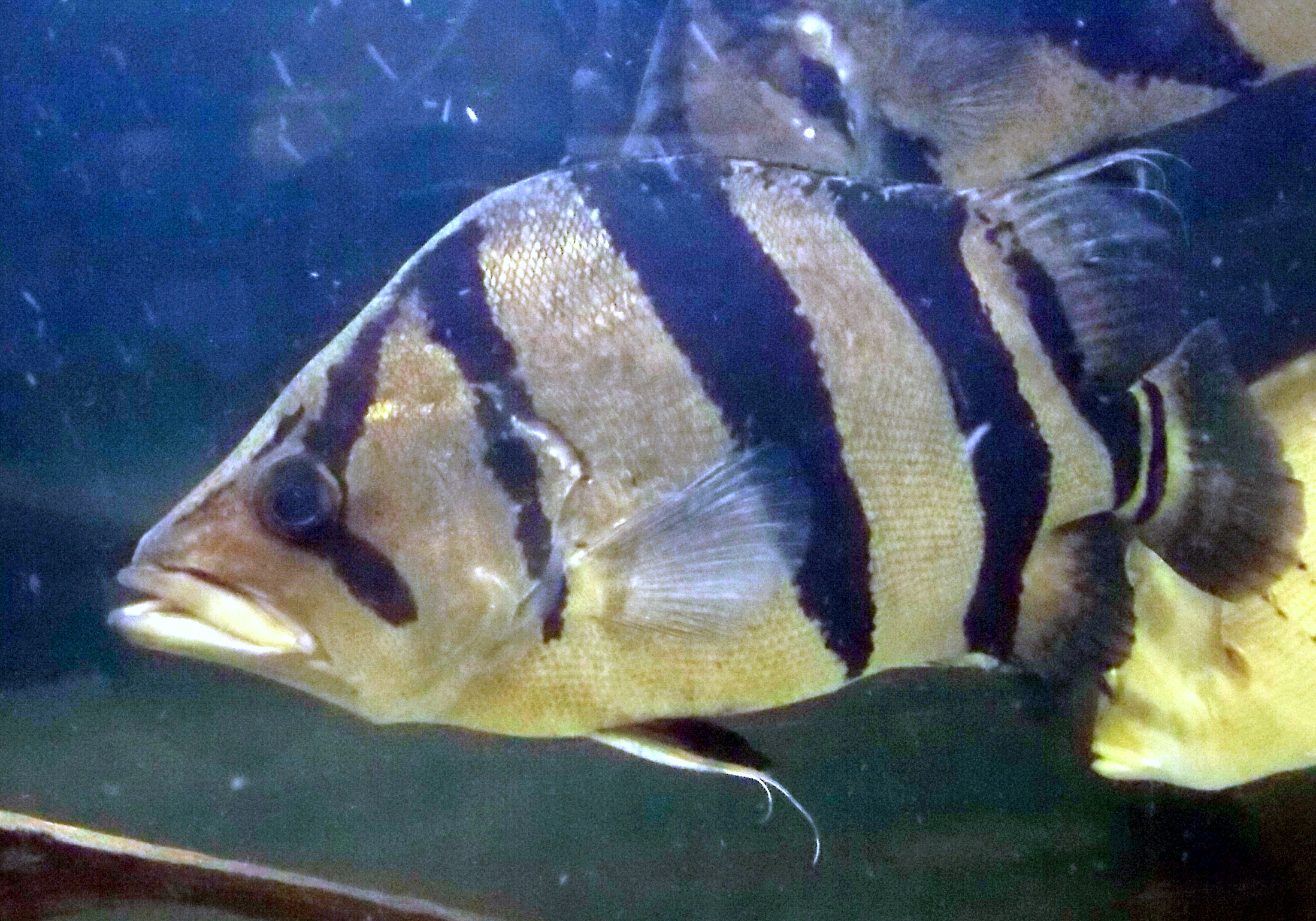
Tiger perch (Datnioides campbelli)

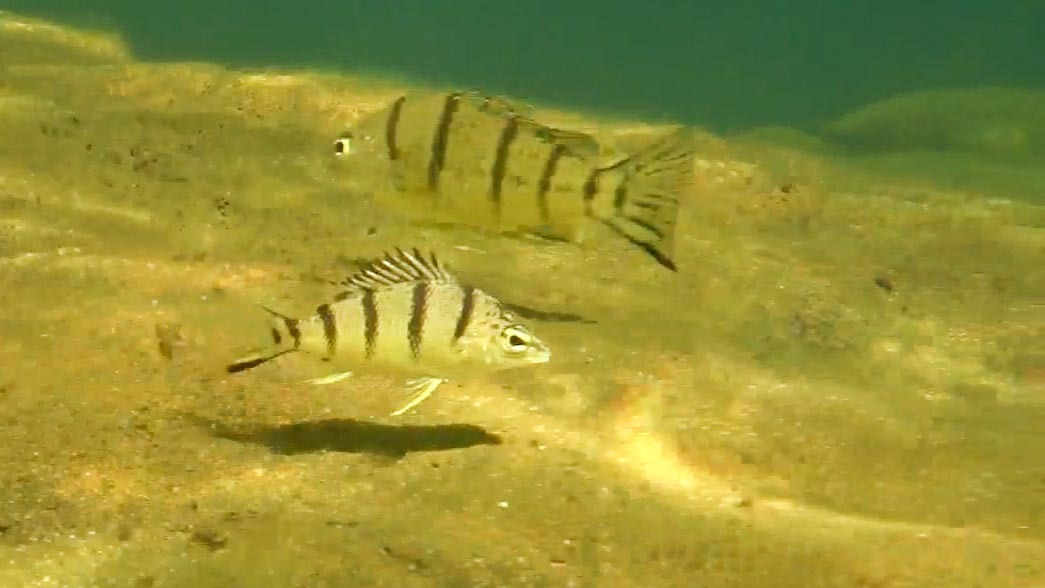
Tiger grunter (Amniataba percoides)
- Amniataba, tiger grunters
- Datnioides, tigerfishes or tiger perches
- Hoplias, more commonly known as traíra or South American wolf fish
- Hydrocynus, the African tigerfishes
- Rhamphochromis, a genus of African cichlids

== Other uses ==
- Tigerfish (torpedo), Cold War-era British torpedo
- USS Tigerfish, fictional US Navy submarine from Ice Station Zebra

== See also ==
- Tiger shark
- Tiger barb
