= Rhamphochromis lucius =

Scientific classification
- Kingdom: Animalia
- Phylum: Chordata
- Class: Actinopterygii
- Order: Cichliformes
- Family: Cichlidae
- Genus: Rhamphochromis
- Species: R. lucius

Binomial name
- Rhamphochromis lucius C. G. E. Ahl, 1926

Species of fish

Rhamphochromis lucius is a species of piscivorous cichlid endemic to Lake Malawi where it prefers deep, open waters. This species can reach a length of 40 centimetres (16 in) TL. It can also be found in the aquarium trade. FishBase treats this species as a valid species, although note that it may be a synonym of Rhamphochromis woodi but the Catalog of Fishes treats it as a synonym of Rhamphochromis esox, as does the IUCN.
