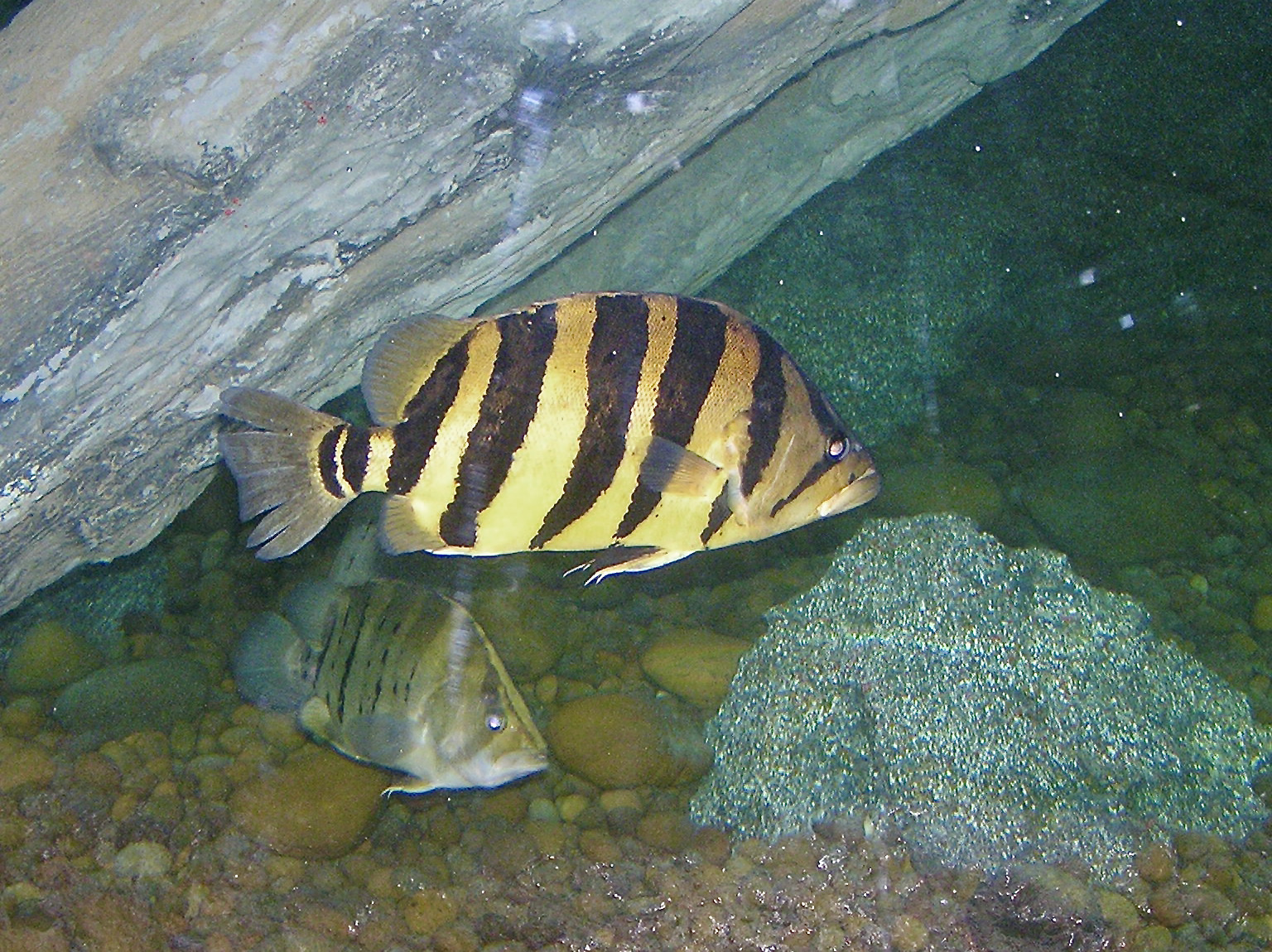
- Datnioides microlepis

Scientific classification
- Kingdom: Animalia
- Phylum: Chordata
- Class: Actinopterygii
- Order: Acanthuriformes
- Family: Lobotidae
- Genus: Datnioides; Bleeker, 1853

Type species
- Datnioides polota Bleeker, 1853

= Datnioides =

Genus of fishes

Datnioides is a genus of ray-finned fish belonging to the family Lobotidae. These fishes are commonly known as tigerfish, tiger perch or freshwater tripletails. These fishes are found in the rivers of southern Asia and new Guinea.

== Taxonomy ==
Datnioides was first proposed as a genus in 1853 by the Dutch physician, herpetologist and ichthyologist Pieter Bleeker, in 1876 Bleeker designated Datnoides polota, which was the same as Coius polota that Francis Hamilton had described in 1822 from the Ganges, as its type species. In 2000 Maurice Kottelat determined that the type species of the genus Coius, Coius cobojius, was a junior synonym of Anabas testudineus so Coius is a junior synonym of Anabas, with Datnioides being the correct name for the tiger perch genus. Historically this genus was classified in the monotypic family Datnioididae but the 5th edition of the Fishes of the World classifies this genus as one of two genera in the family Lobotidae, alongside the tripletails in the genus Lobotes, which it places in the order Spariformes. Some workers include Hapalogenys in the Lobotidae, while other authors place the genus in the monogeneric family Datnioididae, alongside the families Hapalogenyidae and Lobotidae in the order Lobotiformes in the series Eupercaria.

== Etymology ==
Datnioides means having the form of Datnia, a synonym of the Terapontid genus Mesopristes, the lack of teeth on the roof of the mouth meant that these fishes and Mesopristes were thought to be closely related and classified in the Percidae.

== Species ==
The currently recognized species in this genus are:

- Datnioides campbelli Whitley, 1939 – New Guinea tiger perch
- Datnioides microlepis Bleeker, 1854 – finescale tigerfish, Indonesian tigerfish
- Datnioides polota (F. Hamilton, 1822) – silver tigerfish
- Datnioides pulcher (Kottelat, 1998) – Siamese tiger perch, Siamese tigerfish
- Datnioides undecimradiatus (T. R. Roberts & Kottelat, 1994) – Mekong tiger perch

== Characteristics ==
Datnioides tiger perches are characterised by having toothless palatine and vomer. The caudal fin is rounded and there are rounded lobes on the anal and second dorsal fins creating the appearance of having three caudal fins. The dorsal fin is supported by 12 spines and 15 or 16 soft rays. The smallest of the genus is the New Guinea tiger perch (D. campbelli) with a maximum published standard length of 32 cm (13 in) while the largest is the finescale tigerfish (D. microlepis) with a maximum published total length of 55 cm (22 in). The juveniles float on their sides to camouflage themselves as leaves.

== Distribution and habitat ==
Datnioides tiger perches are distributed from India to New Guinea in fresh and brackish waters.
