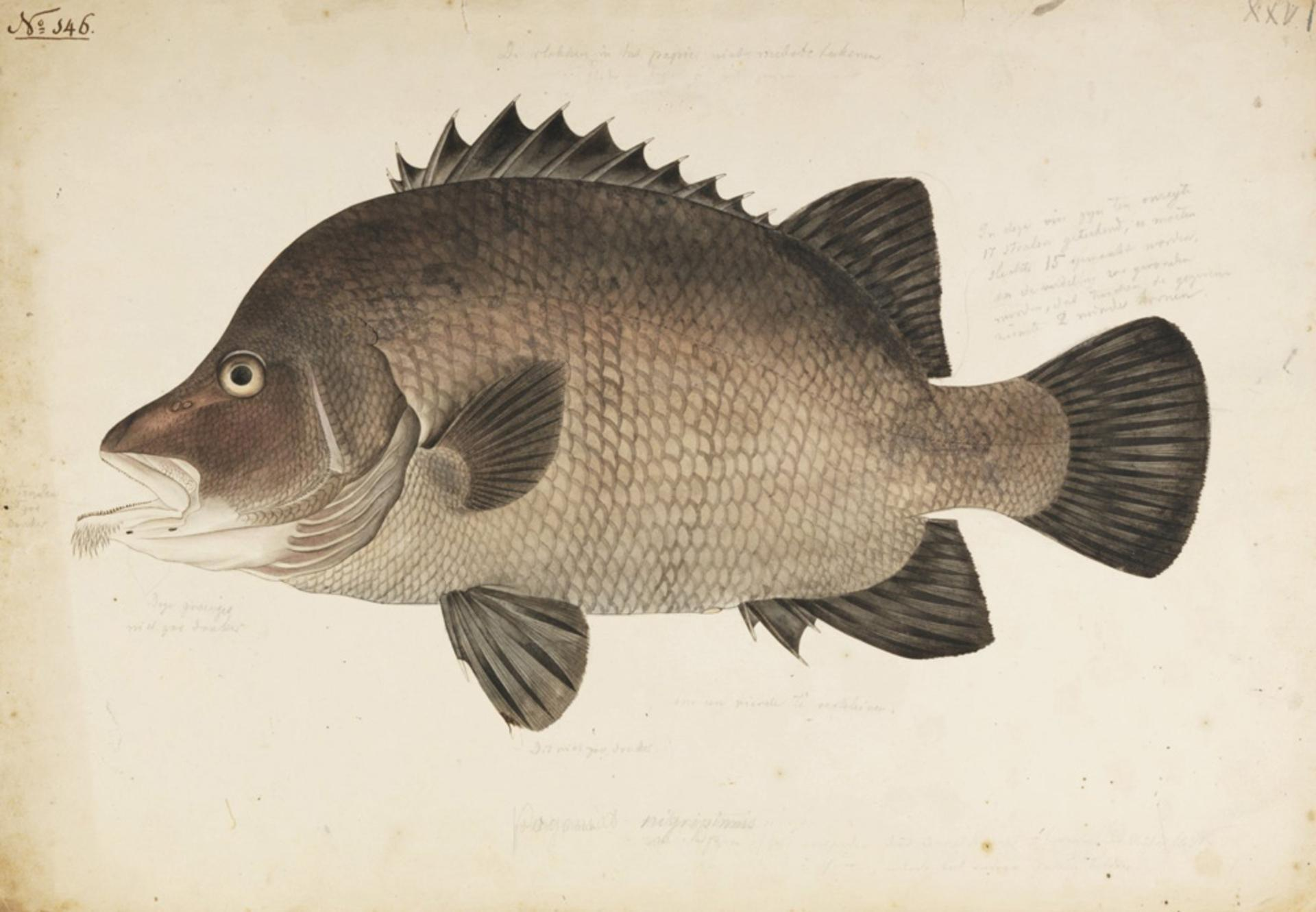

Scientific classification
- Kingdom: Animalia
- Phylum: Chordata
- Class: Actinopterygii
- Order: Perciformes
- Family: Hapalogenyidae
- Genus: Hapalogenys
- Species: H. nigripinnis

Binomial name
- Hapalogenys nigripinnis (Temminck & Schlegel, 1843)

Synonyms
- Pogonias nigripinnis Temminck & Schlegel, 1843; Hapalogenys nitens Richardson, 1844; Hapalogenys aculeatus NyströmEdvard Nyström, 1887; Hapalogenys guentheri Matsubara, 1933

= Hapalogenys nigripinnis =

Species of fish

Hapalogenys nigripinnis, the short barbeled velvetchin or short barbeled grunter is a species of marine ray-finned fish, a velvetchin belonging to the family Hapalogenyidae. It is found in the north western Pacific Ocean.

== Description ==
Hapalogenys nigripinnis has a compressed body. The chin and lower jaw have 10 pores, including 1 tiny pore close to the symphysis on either side, these are so small they may be difficult to detect or be obscured by dense groups of short papillae. There is a bunch of very short dense barbels on the fleshy lower lip. There are frequently two vague oblique dark bands on the body, one coming down from the nape to the rear of the pectoral fin before continuing to the rear part of the soft rayed portion of the anal fin. The second band runs from the base of 3rd or 4th spine of the dorsal fin arcing rearwards over the lateral line to dorsal part of caudal peduncle. The dorsal fin has 11 spines and 14-16 soft rays while the anal fin has 3 spines and 9-10 soft rays. The species has a maximum recorded standard length of 40 cm (16 in).

== Distribution ==
Hapalogenys nigripinnisis found in the north western Pacific Ocean where it occurs in the southern Sea of Japan and the East China Sea.

== Habitat and biology ==
Hapalogenys nigripinnis is found on rocky reefs in coastal waters and around the mouths of rivers, usually over sandy bottoms near rocky coastlines from he summer into the early winter. They feed on benthic crustaceans and fishes.

== Systematics ==
Hapalogenys nigripinnis was first formally described in 1843 as Pogonia nigripinna by Coenraad Jacob Temminck and Hermann Schlegel with the type locality given as Nagasaki Bay in Japan. In 1844 John Richardson described Hapalogenys nitens from Canton and in 1876 Pieter Bleeker designated Richardson's H. nitens as the type species of the genus Hapalogenys. H. nitens was later shown to be a synonym of H. nigripinnis. The specific name is a compound of nigri meaning "black" and pinnis meaning "fins", a reference to the blackish fins.

== Utilisation ==
Hapalogenys nigripinnis is reared in aquaculture in Korea.
