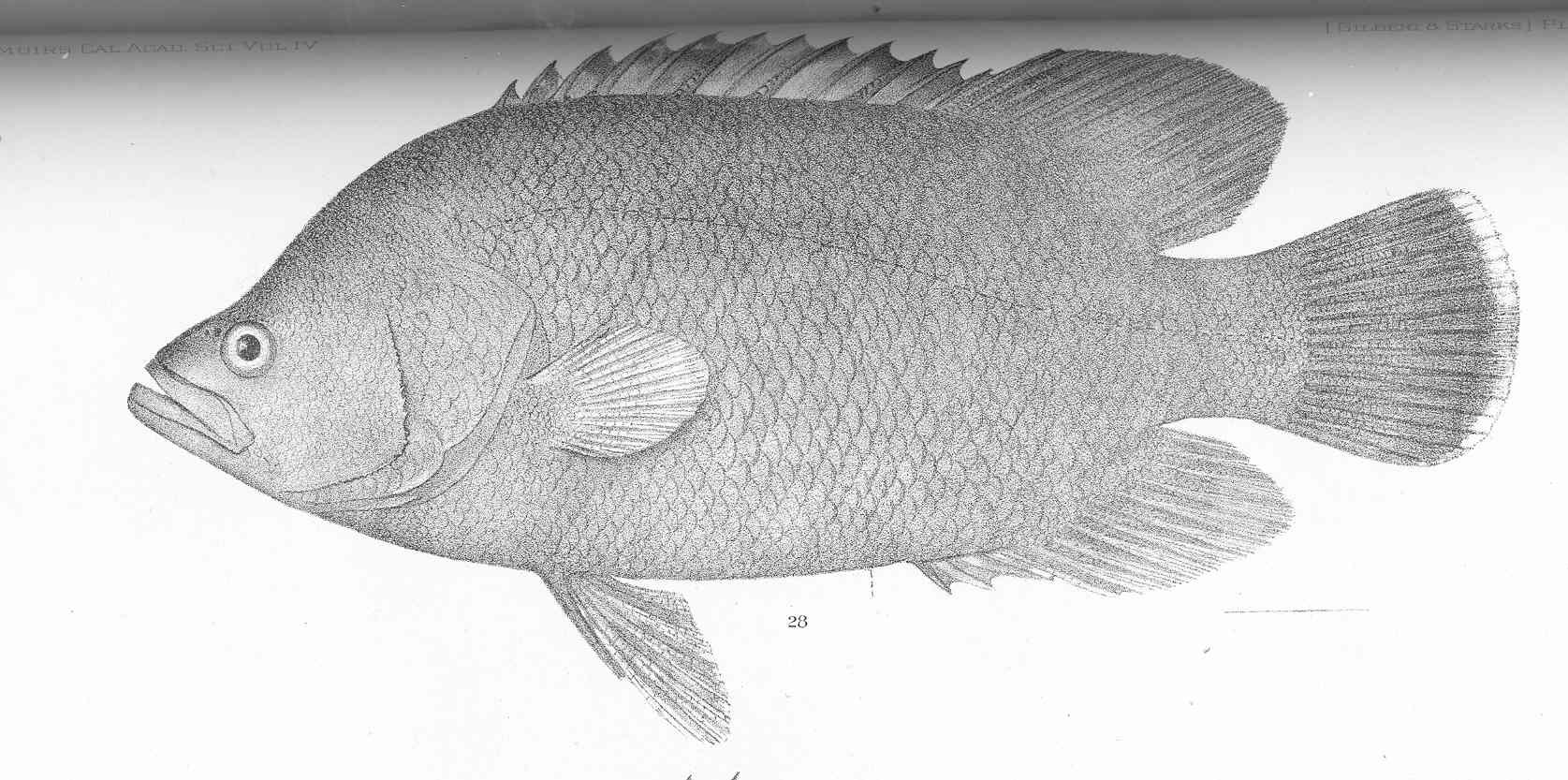
- The type specimen, from Panama
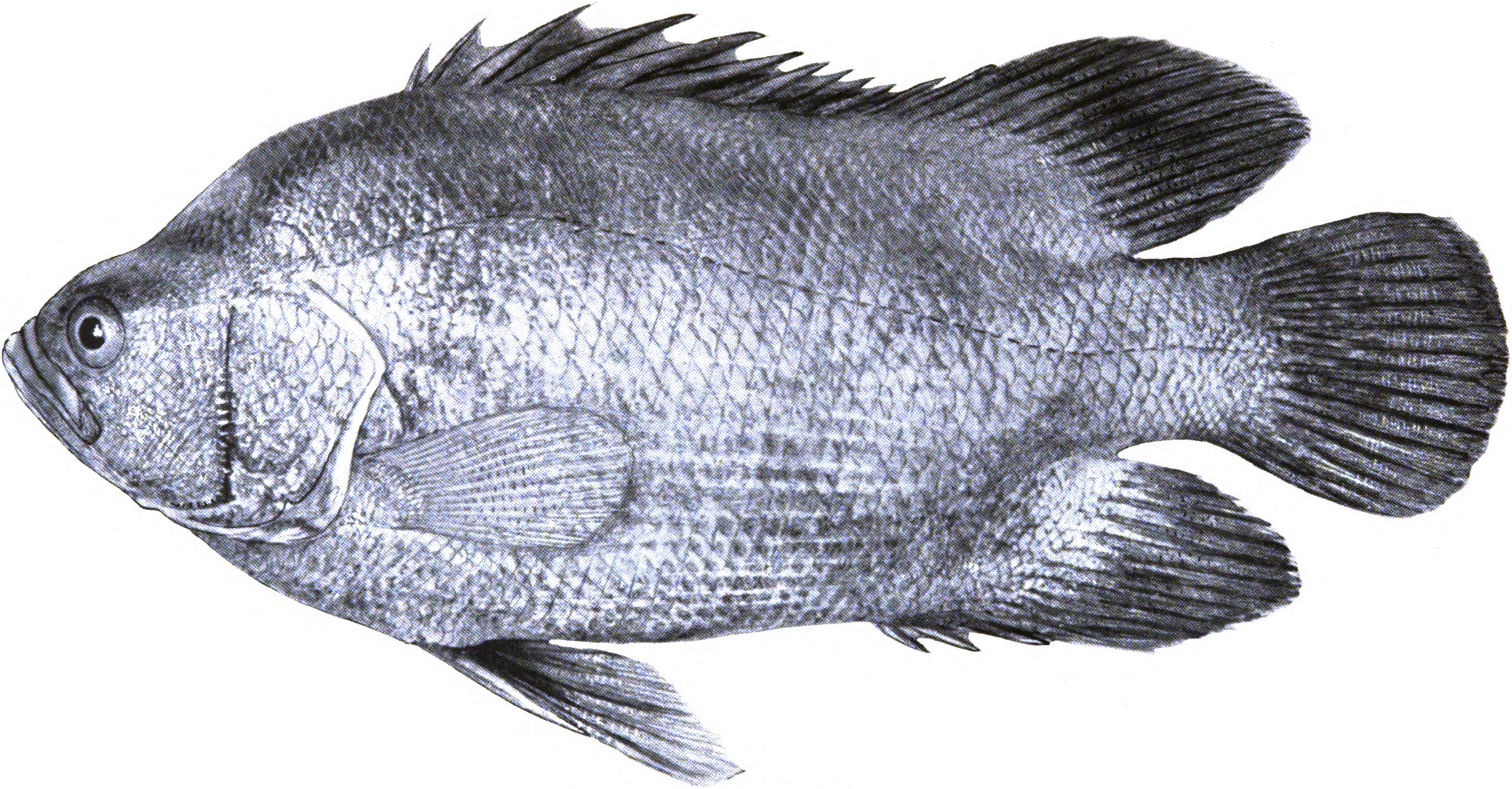
- Another specimen, 200 mm (7.9 in) long

Conservation status
- Least Concern (IUCN 3.1)

Scientific classification
- Kingdom: Animalia
- Phylum: Chordata
- Class: Actinopterygii
- Order: Acanthuriformes
- Family: Lobotidae
- Genus: Lobotes
- Species: L. pacifica

Binomial name
- Lobotes pacifica Gilbert, 1898

Synonyms
- Verrugato pacificus (Gilbert, 1898)

= Lobotes pacifica =

Species of fish

Lobotes pacifica, the Pacific tripletail or West Coast tripletail, is a species of marine ray-finned fish belonging to the family Lobotidae, the tripletails and tiger perches. This species is found in the eastern Pacific Ocean.

== Taxonomy ==
Lobotes pacifica was first formally described in 1898 by the American ichthyologist Charles Henry Gilbert with its type locality given as Panama. It is one of two species in the genus Lobotes, the other is the Atlantic tripletail (L. surinamensis), some authorities consider the two to be conspecific and L. pacifica to be a junior synonym of L. surinamensis. The 5th edition of Fishes of the World classifies the genus Lobotes as one of two genera in the family Lobotidae which it classifies in the order Spariformes.

== Description ==
Lobotes pacifica has an oval to rhomboid shaped, compressed body with a slightly concave forehead and an upper jaw which can be protruded a short distance. There is an outer row of small, densely set canine-like teeth in each jaw and an inner band of smaller teeth but no teeth on the roof of the mouth. The preoperculum is serrated, the serrations shrinking and multiplying as the fish ages, and the operculum has two flat, hidden spines. The continuous dorsal fin is supported by 12 robust spines and 15 or 16 soft rays while the anal fin contains 3 spines and 11 soft rays. The soft rayed portions of the dorsal and anal fins are high and rounded and extend beyond the caudal peduncle to create the impression of three symmetrical caudal fins. The caudal fin is rounded. Adults have an olive coloured body marked with black spots while the juveniles have yellowish bodies with black spots. This species has a maximum published total length of 100 cm (39 in), although 50 cm (20 in) is more typical.

== Distribution and habitat ==
Lobotes pacifica is found near the coast in the eastern Pacific Ocean and the Gulf of California, between Southern California and Peru, at depths between the surface and 50 metres (160 ft) deep. it can also be found around Cocos Island in Costa Rica. This species occurs in bays and brackish water in estuaries, as well as around floating objects in the open sea. The juveniles mimic leaves by floating on their sides at the water's surface.

== Utilization ==
Lobotes pacifica is caught in some artisanal fisheries and commercially sold.
