= Ove Ramel Sehested =

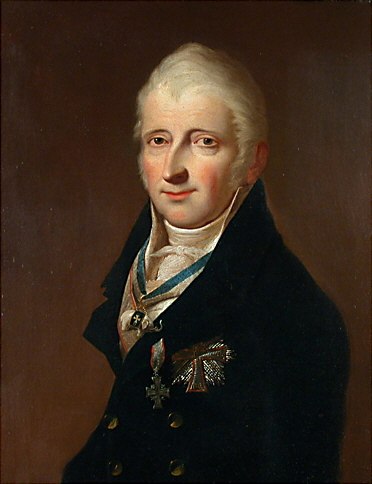

Ove Ram[m]el Sehested (13 March 1757 – 21 October 1838) was a Norwegian-Danish economist, administrator, and a collector of natural history specimens. He served as Minister of the Privy Council of Denmark from 1824 to 1831.

Sehested was born in Nannestad, Norway to Major General Frantz Vilhelm and Anne Barbara Løvenskiold. He was educated at Sorø, Kiel, and at Copenhagen from where he graduated in law. In his early life he was tutored at home by Niels Tønder Lund and this would make him interested in natural history for life. After receiving his law degree, he travelled through Europe and returned to join the college of economics and commerce and was involved in shaping Danish trade and industrial policy, working along with Ernst Heinrich von Schimmelmann. After Schimmelmann's resignation in 1813, Sehested became president of the college. He held many other positions in government, involved in governing the Danish colonies in the West Indies and in Africa. In 1808 he was knighted into the Order of the Dannebrog. He represented Denmark at the Kiel Treaty of 1814.

Sehested was interested in natural history from teenage and went on collecting trips with Tønder Lund, together they visited J. C. Fabricius in Kiel in 1776 and Sir Joseph Banks in England. Sehested's private insect collection was referred to by Fabricius as "Mus. Dom. De Sehestedt". A moth from Sehested's collection was described by Fabricius as Pyralis sehestedtiana. In 1789 Sehested helped found a natural history society. He purchased the collections of Dagobert Karl de Daldorff and the collections of Tønder Lund after their deaths.
