= Dagobert Karl de Daldorff =

Dagobert Carl (also Charles/Karl) von Daldorff (wrongly given in some places as Ingobert Karl Daldorff) (c. 1760 – 18 December 1802) was a senior lieutenant in the Danish East India Company, naturalist and collector of natural history specimens. He is commemorated in the crab genus Daldorfia.

Daldorff was born in Kiel (although some sources claimed that he was born in Moscow) and obtained a doctorate from the University of Kiel in 1795 under J.C. Fabricius. He joined the Danish East India Company army serving as a lieutenant captain. He was sent to conduct natural history studies, supported by Count Schimmelmann, to the Danish colonies of Frederiksnagore where he became a member of the council. He also travelled to the Danish colony of Tranquebar in India. During his travels to India and on his stays he collected insects, crustaceans, birds, and fishes. He maintained a diary of his travels from Copenhagen, leaving on October 14, 1790 and reaching Tranquebar on May 6, 1791, and an excerpt was published by the Danish East India Company. He served as a Second lieutenant at the Garrison in 1792 and Governor Peter Anker recorded that he was excellent in mathematics. While in Tranquebar, he worked on a monograph of the crabs which was never published. In 1795 he went to Sumatra (where he made an ascent of Gunung Bungkuk) and returned to Serampore. In 1798 he clashed with Colonel Bie and resigned from military service in 1799 but continued to stay member of the council. He died at Serampore in 1802. A debt of 665 Danish rigsdaler was paid by Ove R. Sehested who along with Tønder Lund obtained a number of his insect specimens. Some specimens went on to Peter Vogelius Deinboll. Some of the insects that Daldorff collected were examined and a few (such as the dragonfly Tholymis tillarga) were described by Fabricius. Several birds were described by Martin Vahl. The crab genus Daldorfia was named for him by Mary J. Rathbun in 1904. His note on the climbing perch Perca scandens to Joseph Banks was read in the Linnean Society in 1795. He noted that he had seen the fish climbing Borassus palms five feet above the ground using their fins and tails. A diagnostic one-page classification table of the Scarabaeidae was published posthumously by the Asiatic Society of Bengal (which had elected him honorary member in 1802) in 1803. Daldorff's specimens are spread between the Zoological Museum, Copenhagen and at the University of Kiel.
