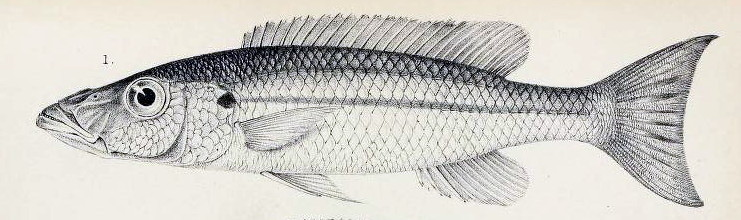

Scientific classification
- Kingdom: Animalia
- Phylum: Chordata
- Class: Actinopterygii
- Order: Cichliformes
- Family: Cichlidae
- Genus: Rhamphochromis
- Species: R. macrophthalmus

Binomial name
- Rhamphochromis macrophthalmus Regan, 1922

= Rhamphochromis macrophthalmus =

Species of fish

Rhamphochromis macrophthalmus is a species of piscivorous cichlid endemic to Lake Malawi where it prefers open waters at depths of from 30 to 109 metres (98 to 358 ft). This species can reach a length of 28.9 centimetres (11.4 in) SL. It can also be found in the aquarium trade. FishBase treats this species as a valid species, but the Catalog of Fishes treats it as a synonym of Rhamphochromis longiceps, as does the IUCN.
