= Rhamphochromis brevis =

Conservation status
- Least Concern (IUCN 3.1)

Scientific classification
- Kingdom: Animalia
- Phylum: Chordata
- Class: Actinopterygii
- Order: Cichliformes
- Family: Cichlidae
- Genus: Rhamphochromis
- Species: R. brevis

Binomial name
- Rhamphochromis brevis Ethelwynn Trewavas, 1935

Species of fish

Rhamphochromis brevis is a species of cichlid endemic to Lake Malawi where it is a predator of other fish and is also an important food fish. This species is not listed in FishBase which regards it as a synonym of Rhamphochromis woodi but Catalog of Fishes treats it as a valid species.
