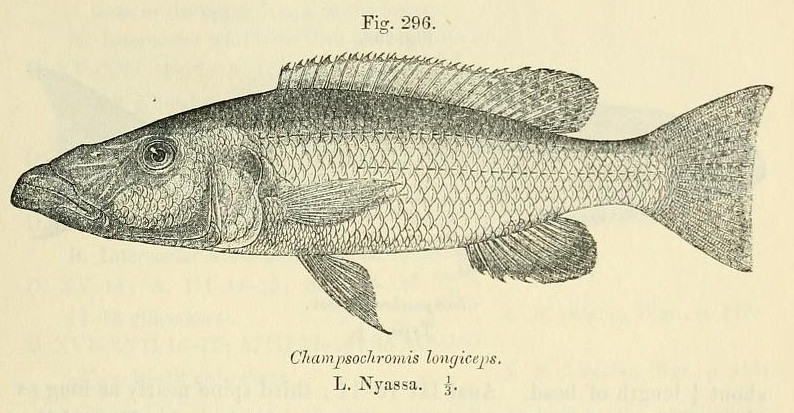

Conservation status
- Vulnerable (IUCN 3.1)

Scientific classification
- Kingdom: Animalia
- Phylum: Chordata
- Class: Actinopterygii
- Order: Cichliformes
- Family: Cichlidae
- Genus: Rhamphochromis
- Species: R. longiceps

Binomial name
- Rhamphochromis longiceps (Günther, 1864)

Synonyms
- Hemichromis longiceps Günther, 1864; Champsochromis longiceps (Günther, 1864); Paratilapia longiceps (Günther, 1864)

= Rhamphochromis longiceps =

Species of fish

Rhamphochromis longiceps, one of several unrelated fish also known as the tigerfish, is a species of cichlid endemic to Lake Malawi and the upper Shire River. It can also be found in the aquarium trade. It occurs in all the habitats in the lake including inshore reefs, rock shelf and littoral zones as well as in the offshore pelagic zone. It is piscivorous and has been recorded at depths of 3–74 metres (10–240 ft). It breeds in both the south east and south west arms of the lake. The females mouthbrood the eggs and while they are doing so they migrate to shallow water to release their offspring among vegetated lagoons and swampy areas. The juveniles are found near the surface in inshore waters over the shelf and littoral zones. The brood size is 27–68 eggs, the maximum total length is 25 centimetres (9.8 in). This species is the type species of the genus Rhamphochromis.
