= Johan Christian Fabricius =

Danish zoologist (1745–1808)

Johann Christian Fabricius
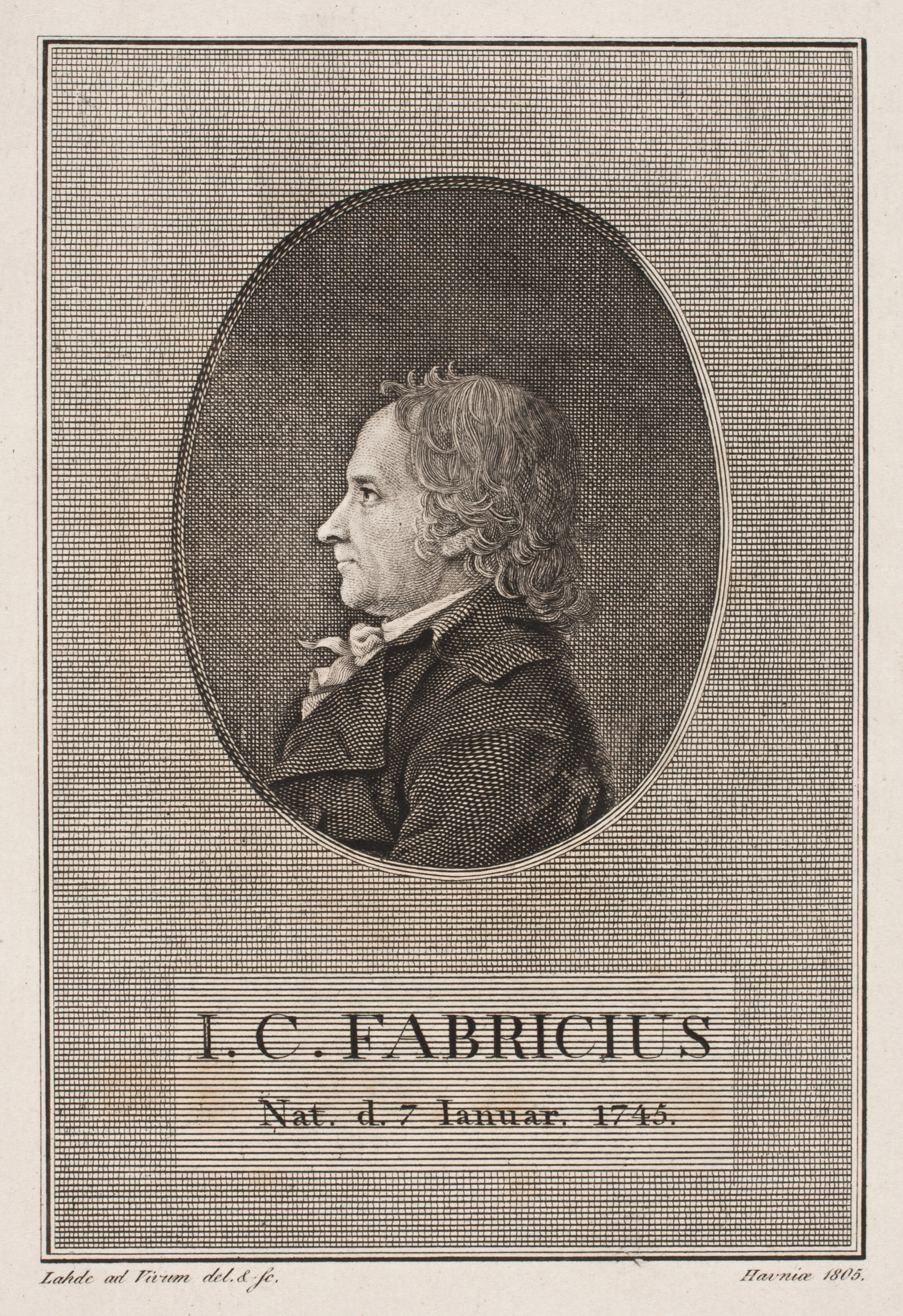
- Born: 7 January 1745; Tønder, Schleswig (now Denmark)
- Died: 3 March 1808 (aged 63); Kiel, Holstein (now Germany)
- Citizenship: Danish
- Education: University of Copenhagen, University of Uppsala
- Known for: Classification of the insects
- Scientific career
- Fields: Zoology
- Workplaces: University of Copenhagen; University of Kiel
- Author abbrev. (botany): J.Fabr.
- Author abbrev. (zoology): Fabricius

Johann Christian Fabricius (7 January 1745 – 3 March 1808) was a Danish zoologist, specialising in the "Insecta", which at that time included all arthropods: insects, arachnids, crustaceans and others. He was a student of Carl Linnaeus, and is considered one of the most important entomologists of the 18th century, having named nearly 10,000 species of animals, and established the basis for the modern insect classification.

== Biography ==
Johann Christian Fabricius was born on 7 January 1745 at Tønder in the Duchy of Schleswig, where his father was a doctor. He studied at the gymnasium at Altona and entered the University of Copenhagen in 1762. Later the same year he travelled together with his friend and relative Johan Zoëga to Uppsala, where he studied under Carl Linnaeus for two years. On his return, he started work on his Systema entomologiae, which was finally published in 1775. Throughout this time, he remained dependent on subsidies from his father, who worked as a consultant at Frederiks Hospital.

Fabricius was appointed a professor at the Charlottenborg-Institution in Copenhagen in 1768 with two years to travel before he joined. When he joined in 1770, the salary was much reduced. The fall of Johann Friedrich Struensee led to him taking up a position in Germany in 1775 at the University of Kiel. As professor of natural history and economics, he was promised that they would build a natural history museum and a botanical garden. Although he tried to resign three times, on one occasion only being prevented by an appeal from his students to the Danish King and Duke of Schleswig, Christian VII, Fabricius held the position at Kiel for the rest of his life.

During his time in Kiel, Fabricius repeatedly travelled to London in the summer to study the collections of British collectors, such as Joseph Banks and Dru Drury. Towards the end of his career, Fabricius spent much of his time living in Paris with his wife, where he frequently met with naturalists such as Georges Cuvier and Pierre André Latreille; he was also interested in the events of the French Revolution. He spent summers in Copenhagen to study the collections of his students O. R. Sehested and Tønder Lund. On hearing of the British attack on Copenhagen in 1807, Fabricius returned to Kiel, damaging his already fragile health. He died on 3 March 1808, at the age of 63.

Possessing a great knowledge of languages, Fabricius travelled through the northern and middle states of Europe, collecting new materials and frequenting various museums from which he described all those insects of which description had not hitherto been published. Fabricius was of an amiable disposition, and is said to have been reproached by a fellow professor for his extreme modesty which his friend urged would retard his advancement.

His daughter died in an accident in Paris, but he was survived by two sons, who both studied medicine.

== Evolution ==
The evolutionary ideas of Fabricius are not well known. He believed that man originated from the great apes and that new species could be formed by the hybridization of existing species. He also has been called the "Father of Lamarckism" because of his belief that new species could form from morphological adaptation. Fabricius wrote about the influence of environment on development of species and selection phenomena (females preferring the strongest males). He suggested the use of male genitalia features for differentiating closely resembling insect species.

== Works ==
Fabricius is considered one of the greatest entomologists of the 18th century. He was a greater observer of insects than his more botanically-minded mentor, Carl Linnaeus. Fabricius named 9,776 species of insects, compared to Linnaeus' tally of around 3,000. He identified many species of Tenebrionidae from the Egyptian Sinai on the basis of other entomologists' collections.

Fabricius added two distinct areas to the classification system. He considers both artificial and natural characteristics. Artificial characteristics allow for the determination of a species, and natural ones allow for the relationship to other genera and varieties.

In contrast to Linnaeus' classification of the insects, which was based primarily on the number of wings, and their form, Fabricius used the form of the mouthparts to discriminate the orders (which he termed "classes"). He stated "those whose nourishment and biology are the same, must then belong to the same genus." Fabricius' system remains the basis of insect classification today, although the names he proposed are not. For instance, his name for the order containing the beetles was "Eleutherata", rather than the modern "Coleoptera", and he used "Piezata" for Hymenoptera; his term Glossata is still in use, but for a slightly smaller group among the Lepidoptera, rather than the whole order. Fabricius also foresaw that the male genitalia would provide useful characters for systematics, but could not apply that insight himself.

Fabricius was the first to divide the Staphylinidae (rove beetles), which Linnaeus had considered a single genus that he called "Staphylinus", establishing in 1775 the genus Paederus. He also described 77 species of Staphylinidae.

His major works on systematic entomology were:

- Systema entomologiae (1775)
- Genera insectorum (1776)
- Species insectorum (1781). Full title: Species insectorum, exhibentes eorum differentias specificas, synonyma auctorum, loca natalia, metamorphosin, adjectis observationibus, descriptionibus
- Mantissa insectorum (1787)
- Entomologia systematica emendata et aucta (1792–1799)
- Systema eleuthatorum (1801)
- Systema rhyngotorum (1803)
- Systema piezatorum (1804)
- Systema antliatorum (1805)
- Systema glossatorum (1807)

Fabricius' collections are shared between the Natural History Museum, London, the Muséum national d'histoire naturelle, Paris, the Hope Department of Entomology, Oxford, the Hunterian Museum and Art Gallery, Glasgow, the Zoological Museum in Kiel, and the Statens Naturhistoriske Museum, Copenhagen.

Fabricius also wrote a few works on economics, although these are much less important than his zoological works. They include Begyndelsesgrundene i de økonomiske Videnskaber (1773), Polizeischriften (1786–1790) and Von der Volksvermehrung, insonderheit in Dänemark (1781).
