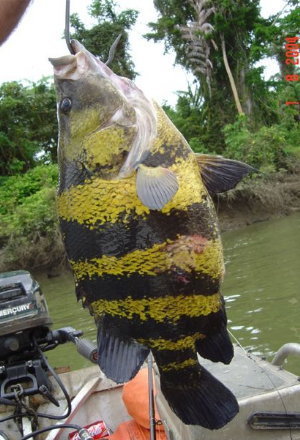

Conservation status
- Least Concern (IUCN 3.1)

Scientific classification
- Kingdom: Animalia
- Phylum: Chordata
- Class: Actinopterygii
- Order: Acanthuriformes
- Family: Lobotidae
- Genus: Datnioides
- Species: D. campbelli

Binomial name
- Datnioides campbelli Whitley, 1939

Synonyms
- Coius campbelli (Whitley, 1939)

= Datnioides campbelli =

Species of fish

Datnioides campbelli, the New Guinea tiger perch, New Guinea tigerfish or Campbell's tigerfish, is a species of ray-finned fish belonging to the family Lobotidae. This species is found in both fresh and brackish waters in rivers, swamps and tidal creeks in southern New Guinea.

== Taxonomy ==
Datnioides campbelli was first formally described in 1939 by the Australian ichthyologist Gilbert Percy Whitley with its type locality given as the Fly River in Papua New Guinea. The 5th edition of the Fishes of the World classifies its genus as one of two in the family Lobotidae, alongside the tripletails in the genus Lobotes, within the order Spariformes.

== Etymology ==
Datnioides campbelli has a specific name that honours the RAAF officer Flight Lieutenant Stuart Campbell who collected the type.

== Description ==
Datnioides campbelli has the characteristic toothless palatine and vomer of Datnioides tiger perches with a rounded caudal fin and rounded lobes on the anal and second dorsal fins creating the appearance of having three caudal fins. The dorsal fin is supported by 12 spines and 15 or 16 soft rays. The underlying colour is golden yellow marked with 5 or 6 broad, vertical dark bars with indistinct edges along the body. The part of the back in front of the dorsal fin is concave. This predatory fish reaches up to 35 cm (14 in) in standard length. This species has a maximum published standard length of 32 cm (13 in).

== Distribution and habitat ==
Datnioides campbelli is endemic to south-central New Guinea between the Lorentz River in the Papua Province of Indonesia and the Kikori River in Papua New Guinea. It extends from the tidal parts of the Fly River into its middle and upper reaches. This fish occurs in brackish tidal reaches of rivers into the non-tidal reaches of rivers.

== Utilisation ==
Datnioides campbelli is commonly caught and eaten throughout its range. Fishes in the genus Datnoides are popular in the aquarium trade but this species is rare and expensive.
