= Rhamphochromis ferox =

Conservation status
- Data Deficient (IUCN 3.1)

Scientific classification
- Kingdom: Animalia
- Phylum: Chordata
- Class: Actinopterygii
- Order: Cichliformes
- Family: Cichlidae
- Genus: Rhamphochromis
- Species: R. ferox

Binomial name
- Rhamphochromis ferox Regan, 1922

Species of fish

Rhamphochromis ferox is a species of piscivorous cichlid endemic to deep waters of Lake Malawi and the upper reaches of the Shire River. This species can reach a length of 45 centimetres (18 in) TL. It can also be found in the aquarium trade.
