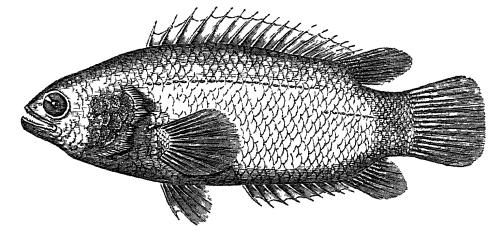

Conservation status
- Data Deficient (IUCN 3.1)

Scientific classification
- Kingdom: Animalia
- Phylum: Chordata
- Class: Actinopterygii
- Order: Anabantiformes
- Family: Anabantidae
- Genus: Anabas
- Species: A. cobojius

Binomial name
- Anabas cobojius (F. Hamilton, 1822)
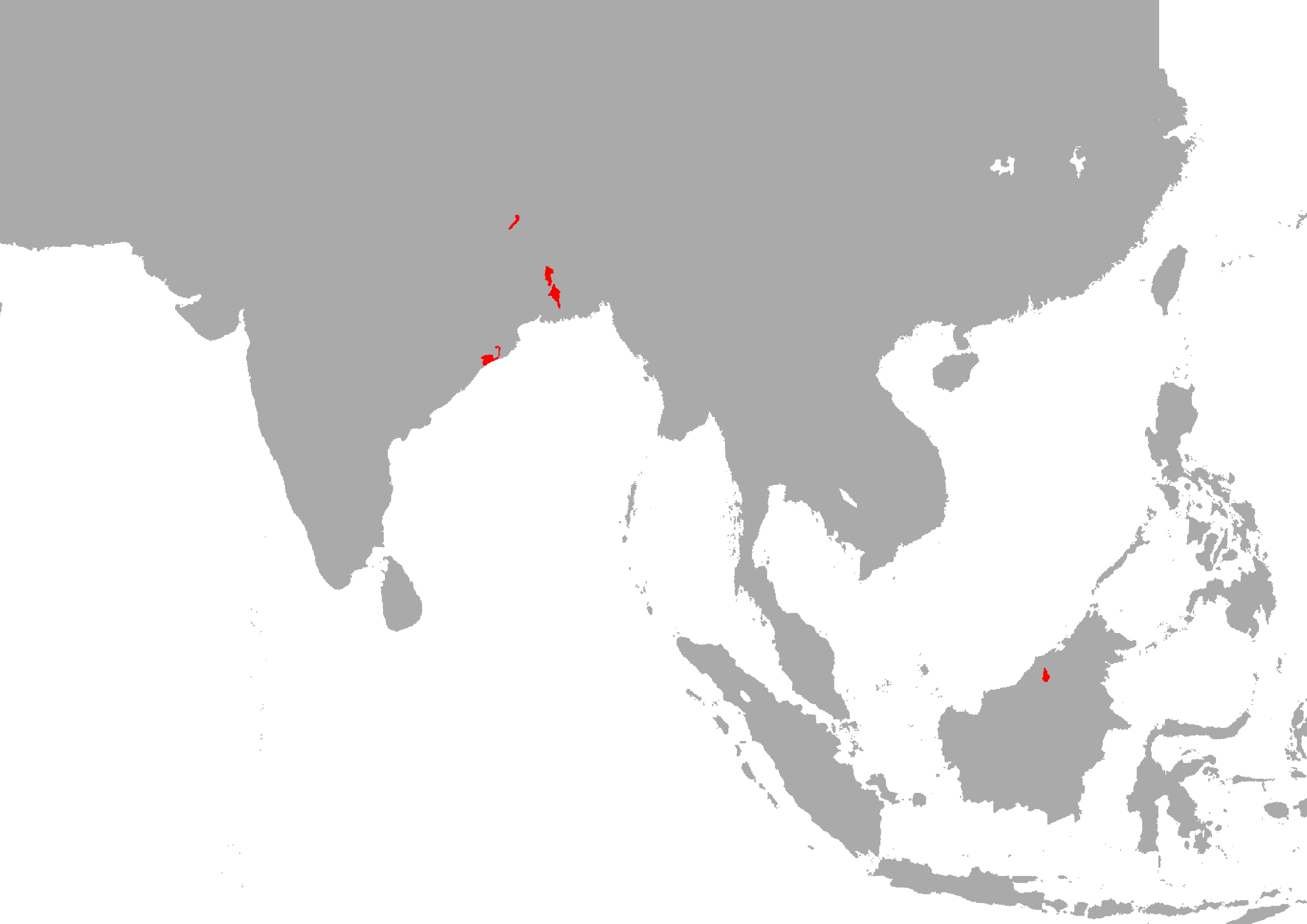
- Extant distribution of Anabas cobojius, including that of uncertain origin

Synonyms
- Coius cobojius Hamilton, 1822; Anabas oligolepis Bleeker, 1855

= Anabas cobojius =

Species of fish

Anabas cobojius, the Gangetic koi, popularly known as Koi in Bengali, is a species of climbing gourami native to Bangladesh and India, where it occurs in many types of standing water bodies. This species reaches a total length of 30 cm (12 in) and is carnivorous, feeding on water invertebrates and their larvae. It is of commercial importance as a food fish in its native range. In addition to being fished, it may be threatened by siltation from deforestation and agricultural activities, pollution and habitat change by hydropower and dam development. The exact population is unknown. It spawns once during the rainy season from May–July.

== Popular culture ==
A Bengali idiom says "Koi machher pran" or "Life of Koi fish" as this fish can survive a long time outside of water. A more literal translation of the idiom would be "koi fish's life".
