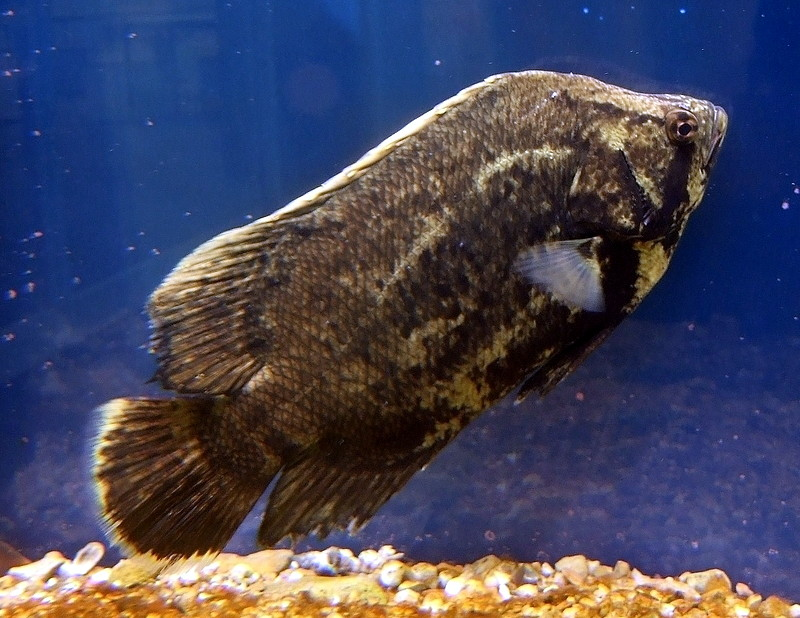
- Adult
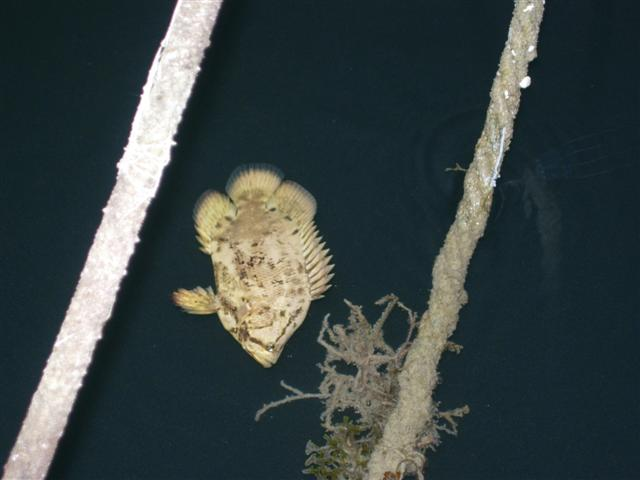
- juvenile

Conservation status
- Least Concern (IUCN 3.1)

Scientific classification
- Kingdom: Animalia
- Phylum: Chordata
- Class: Actinopterygii
- Order: Acanthuriformes
- Family: Lobotidae
- Genus: Lobotes
- Species: L. surinamensis

Binomial name
- Lobotes surinamensis (Bloch, 1790)

Synonyms
- Holocentrus surinamensis Bloch, 1790; Bodianus triourus Mitchill, 1815; Lobotes somnolentus Cuvier, 1830; Lobotes erate Cuvier, 1830; Lobotes farkharii Cuvier, 1830; Lobotes incurvus Richardson, 1846; Lobotes citrinus Richardson, 1846; Lobotes auctorum Günther, 1859

= Atlantic tripletail =

Species of fish

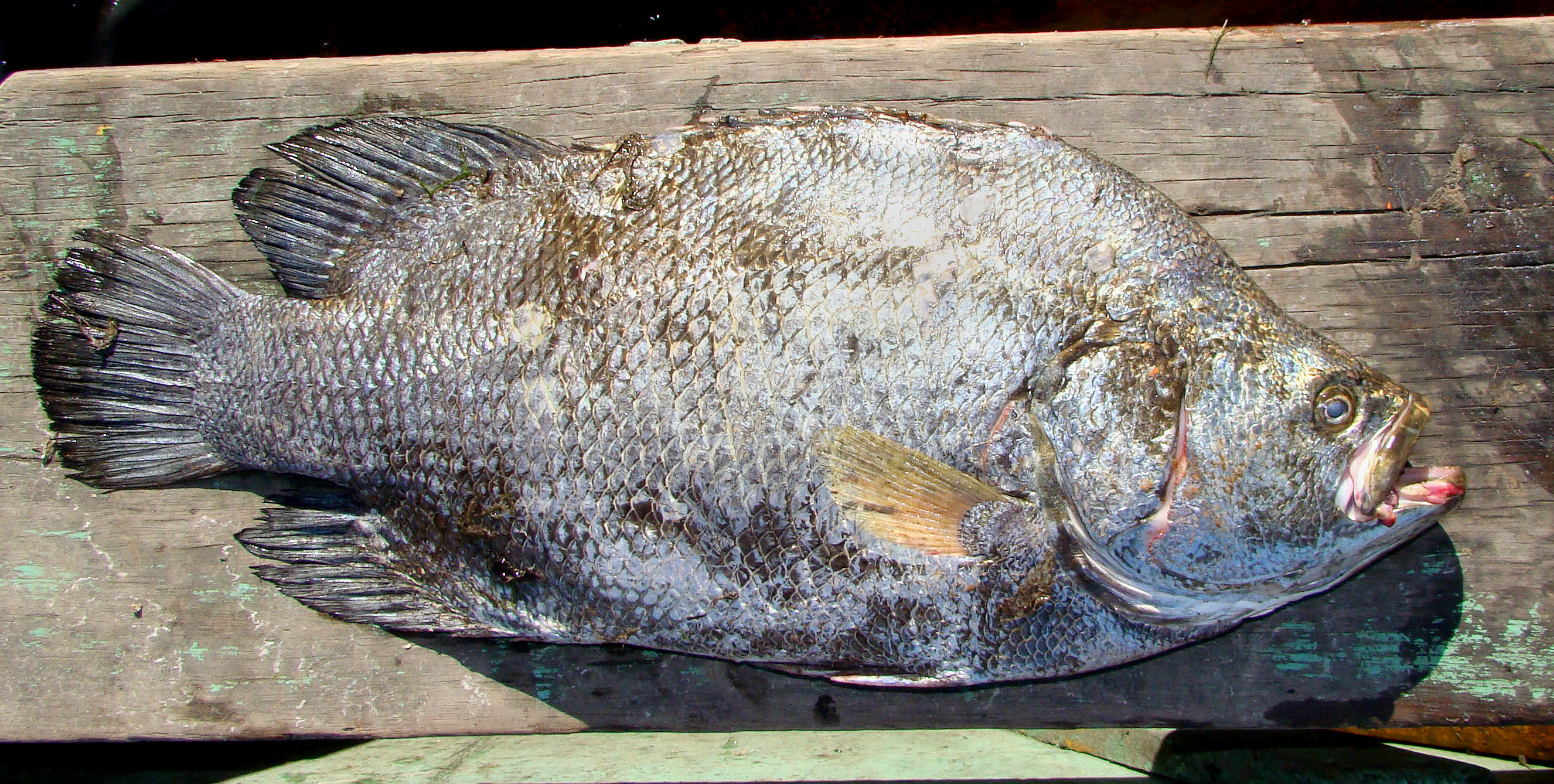
Lobotes surinamensis, Rio Grande do Sul, Brazil

The Atlantic tripletail (Lobotes surinamensis), also known as the black grunt, black perch, buoy fish, buoyfish, brown triple tail, brown tripletail, conchy leaf, dusky triple-tail, dusky tripletail, flasher, sleepfish, triple tail, triple-tail, tripletail, or tripple tail, is a species of marine, ray-finned fish belonging to the family Lobotidae.

This fish is found in tropical and subtropical waters around the world except for the Eastern Pacific Ocean, where its sister species, the Pacific tripletail (L. pacifica) is found.

== Taxonomy ==
The Atlantic tripletail was first formally described in 1790 as Holocentrus surinamensis by German physician and naturalist Marcus Elieser Bloch, with its type locality given as the Caribbean Sea off Suriname. In 1830 Georges Cuvier proposed the new genus Lobotes with Holocentrus surinamensis as its type species by monotypy. Some authorities treat Lobotes as a monospecific genus with the Pacific tripletail (L. pacifica) being regarded as a synonym of a single pantropical L. surinamensis. Lobotes is one of two genera in the family Lobotidae which the 5th edition of Fishes of the World classifies in the order Spariformes, although has also been classified in the order Acanthuriformes by Eschmeyer's Catalog of Fishes (2025).

== Description ==
The Atlantic tripletail has an oval- to rhomboid-shaped, compressed body with a slightly concave forehead and an upper jaw, which can be protruded a short distance. An outer row of small, densely set canine-like teeth is in each jaw, with an inner band of smaller teeth, but no teeth on the roof of the mouth. The preoperculum is serrated, the serrations shrinking and multiplying as the fish ages, and the operculum has two flat, hidden spines. The continuous dorsal fin is supported by 12 robust spines and 15 or 16 soft rays, while the anal fin contains three spines and 11 soft rays. The soft-rayed portions of the dorsal and anal fins are high and rounded and extend beyond the caudal peduncle to create the impression of three symmetrical caudal fins. The caudal fin itself is rounded. Adults are dark brown or greenish yellow on the upper body and head and greyish silver on the lower body. The pectoral fins are pale yellow with the other fins being a darker colour than the body. The caudal fin has a yellow margin. This species has a maximum published total length of 110 cm (43 in) and a weight of 19.2 kg (42.5 lb), with 80 cm (31 in) being typical. Juveniles have a mottled body with a mix of yellow, brown, and black.

== Geographical distribution ==
The Atlantic tripletail is the only fish in the family Lobotidae that can be found in the Atlantic Ocean. It is, however, distributed across tropical seas, especially in the Indonesian region, which is commonly found in wet markets such as in Pontianak, West Kalimantan.

In US waters, Atlantic tripletails are found from Massachusetts and Bermuda to Argentina, the eastern Atlantic, and Mediterranean Sea, from Madeira Island to the Gulf of Guinea, the eastern Pacific from Costa Rica to Peru, and the western Pacific from Japan to Fiji and Tuvalu. They are rarely found north of Chesapeake Bay. They are found on the Gulf Coast from April to October and then migrate to warmer waters during winter. In the spring, tripletails concentrate just offshore of two particular spots: Port Canaveral, Florida (March–June) and Jekyll Island, Georgia (April–July).

The Atlantic tripletail has been recorded as far north as the United Kingdom.

== Habitat and ecology ==
Atlantic tripletails are found coastally in most tropical and subtropical seas. They are somewhat migratorial and pelagic. Normally solitary, they have been known to form schools. They can be found in bays, sounds, and estuaries during the summer. Juveniles are usually found swimming under patches of Sargassum algae. In the Gulf of Mexico, adults are usually found in open water, but can also be found in passes, inlets, and bays near river mouths. Large adults are sometimes found near the surface over deep, open water, although always associated with floating objects. Young fish are also often found in or near shipwrecks, beams or supports, jetties, flotsam, and sea buoys. Fry are usually found in waters that exceed 84 °F (29 °C), greater than 3.3‰ salinity, and more than 230 ft (70 m) deep.

Tripletails are well known for their unusual behavior of floating just beneath the surface with one side exposed, mimicking a leaf or floating debris. They are also known to be able to change between light and dark shades of their normal coloration. These behaviors may help juveniles avoid predators and are also believed to be a feeding strategy. Located in rafts of flotsam, near buoys, channel markers, crab trap floats, and other floating structures that provide cover for prey species, tripletails floating on their sides may appear to be part of this cover, allowing close approach before the prey are taken in ambush. The behavior has resulted in a rapidly increasing incidence of recreational fishermen sight-fishing for the floating tripletail, resulting in severe bag and length restrictions in Florida and Georgia to ensure future populations.

== Biology ==
=== Diet ===
Atlantic tripletails are opportunistic feeders, consuming a variety of foods, mostly small finfish such as gulf menhaden, Atlantic bumpers, and anchovies. They also feed on invertebrates such as blue crabs and brown shrimp, as well as other benthic crustaceans.

=== Reproduction ===
Spawning primarily occurs in the summer along both the Atlantic and the U.S. Gulf Coasts, with peaks during July and August. The species is known to spawn in open water, with peak spawning occurring in the summer. Females can produce up to 700,000 eggs per spawning event, and the eggs are pelagic and buoyant. The larvae are planktonic and undergo significant morphological changes before settling to the substrate. Males reach sexual maturity at a smaller size and younger age than females. Large congregations of tripletails during the summer in the inshore and nearshore waters of coastal Georgia suggest this area is a critical estuarian spawning habitat for the species. Larval Atlantic tripletails go through four levels of development - preflexion, flexion, postflexion, and transformation. By the time the larvae reach 0.16 in (4 mm), they have large eyes and concave heads. The larvae of Atlantic tripletails resemble those of other species such as boarfishes, some jacks, spadefishes, and bass.

=== Predators ===
Atlantic tripletails do not have many predators, but are preyed upon by a variety of large predators, including sharks, barracuda, and other large, predatory fish. Juvenile tripletails are also vulnerable to predation by birds, such as pelicans and gulls, which can be attracted to floating debris where the fish are sheltering.

=== Parasites ===
Parasites of the tripletail include the copepod Anuretes heckelii, which affects the gills, Lernanthropus pupa, which affects the gill filaments, and the ectoparasitic copepod Caligus tenius.

== Importance to humans ==
A few tons of Atlantic tripletails are fished commercially on the east and west coasts of Florida, and marketed fresh, frozen, or salted. They are mainly caught using haul seines, gill nets, and line gear. They are commonly taken as bycatch in driftnet catches of tuna along the edge of the continental shelf. It is a popular target for recreational anglers and its flesh is highly palatable and is considered superior to some other game fishes.

== Conservation ==
The Atlantic tripletail is listed as a least-concern species by the International Union for Conservation of Nature. Both Florida and Georgia have a bag limit of two fish per day for recreational fishing. In Florida, the minimum length is 18 in; in Georgia, it is 18 in.

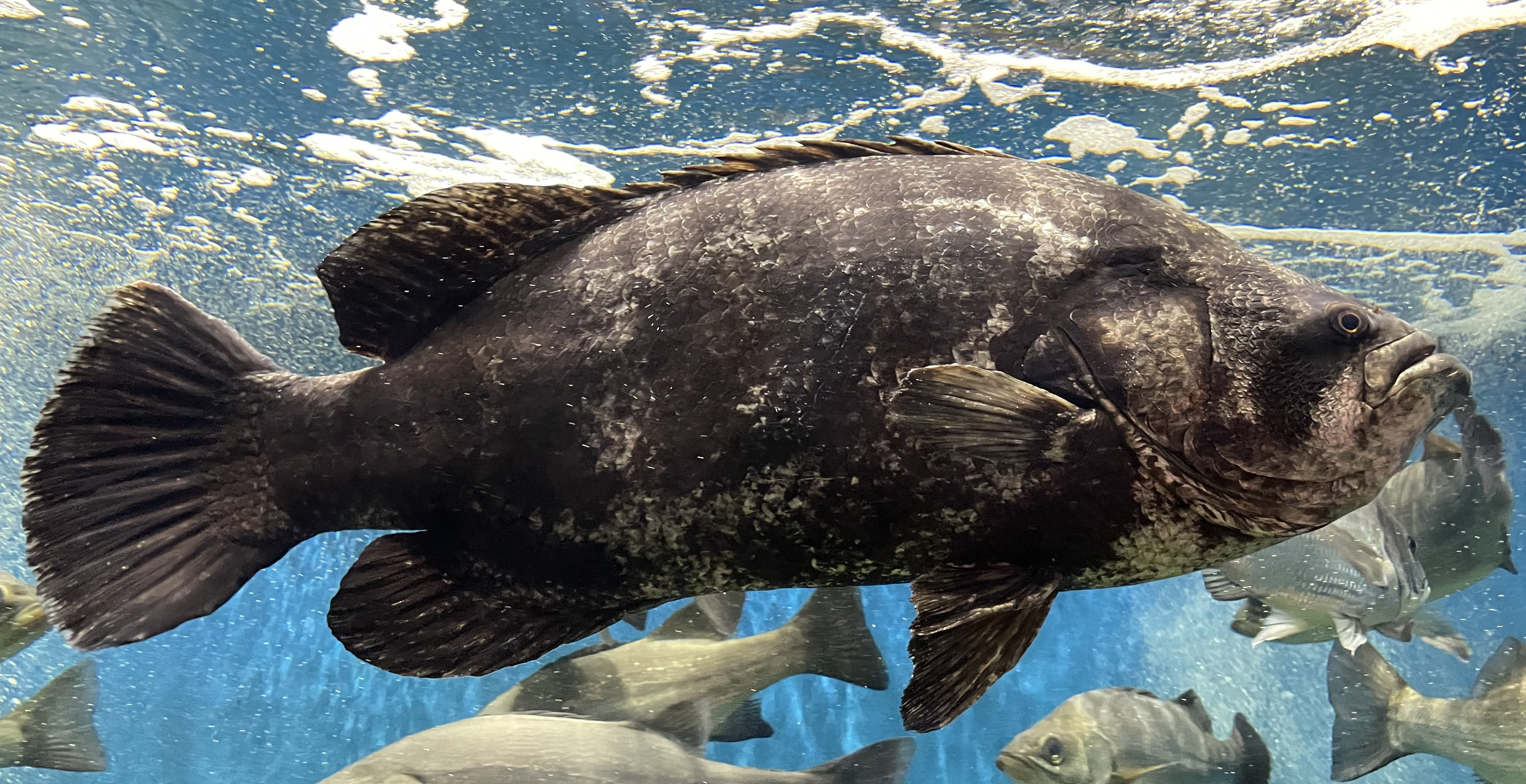
Adult in an aquarium

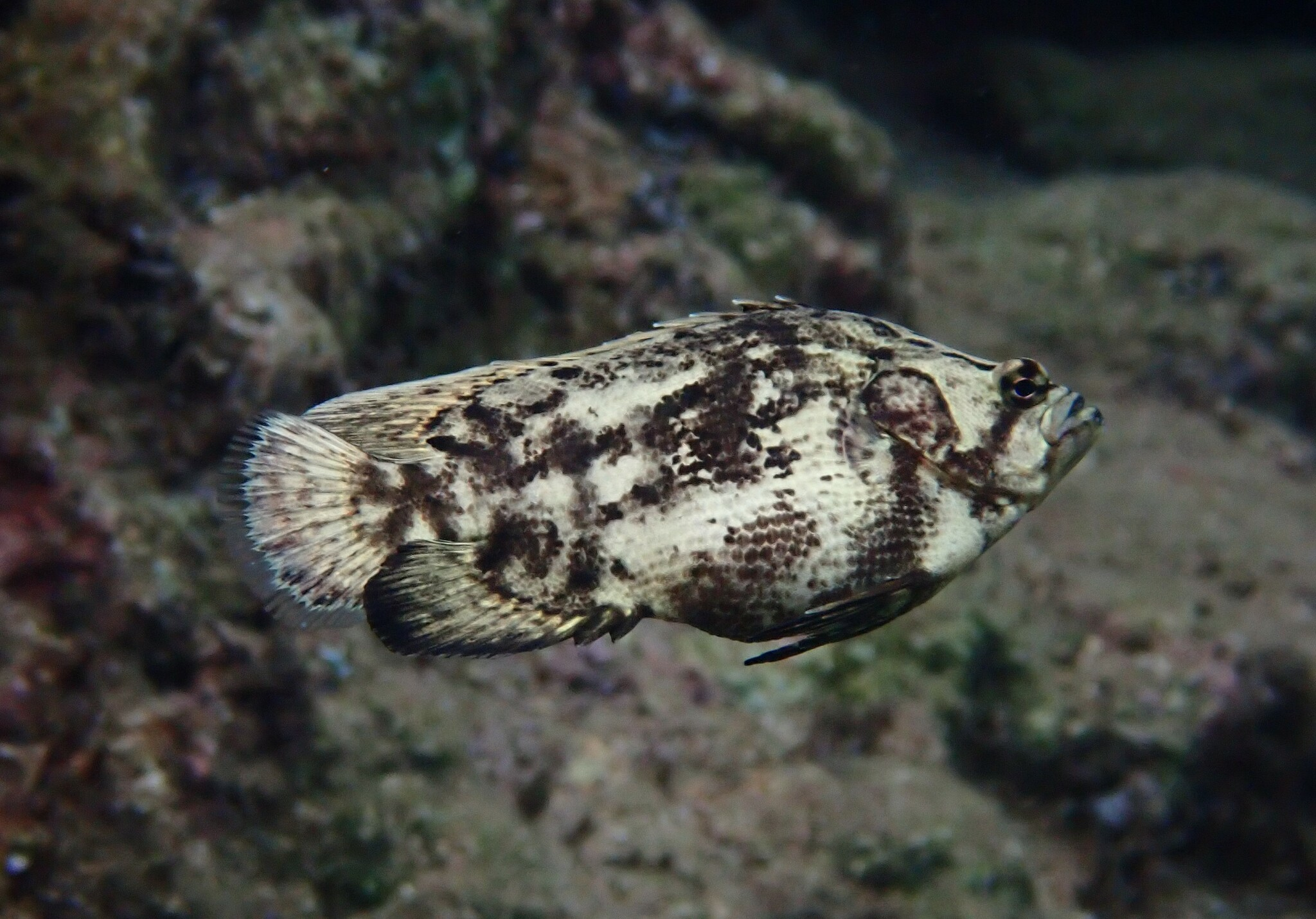
Juvenile with distinct coloration

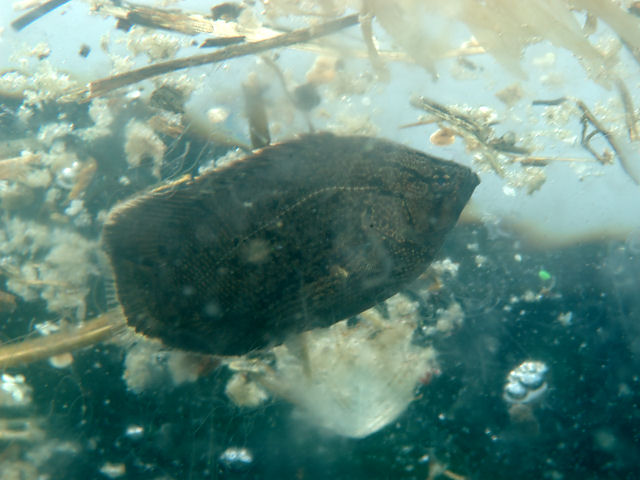
Young juvenile near a floating algae mat

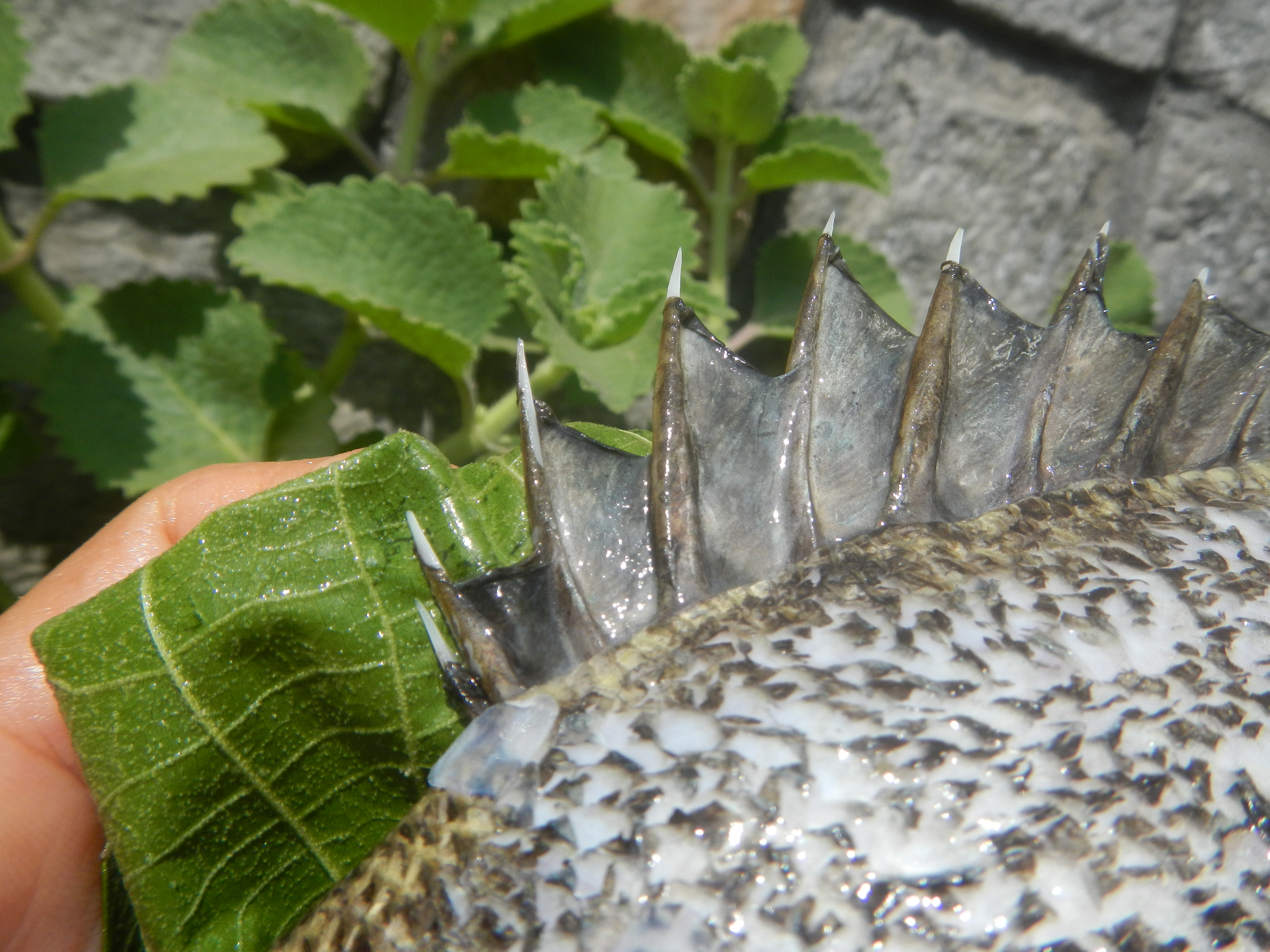
Dorsal Spines

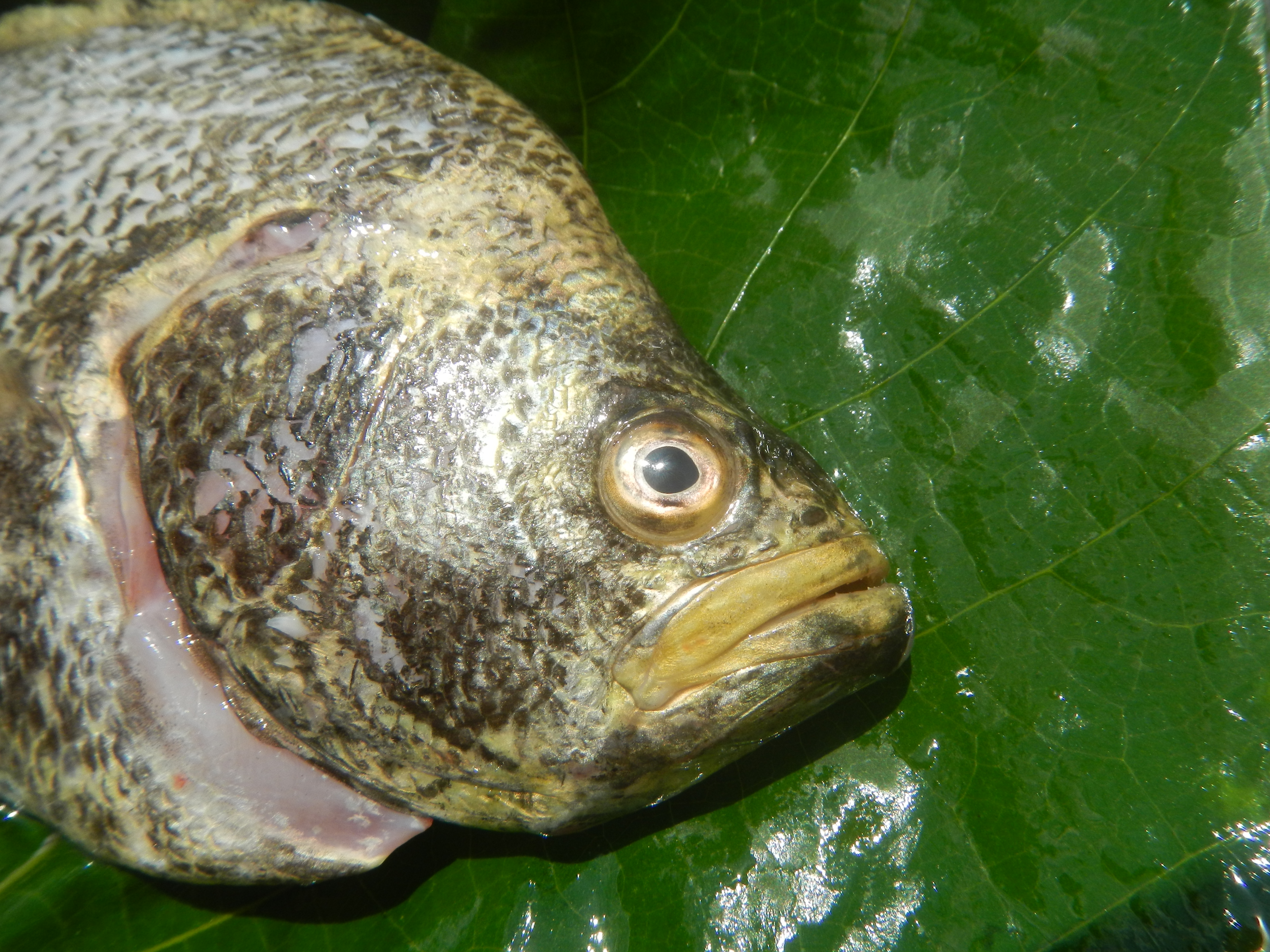
Head
