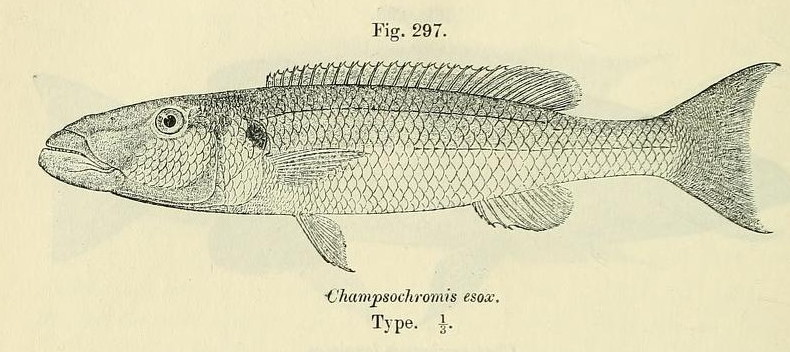

Conservation status
- Vulnerable (IUCN 3.1)

Scientific classification
- Kingdom: Animalia
- Phylum: Chordata
- Class: Actinopterygii
- Order: Cichliformes
- Family: Cichlidae
- Genus: Rhamphochromis
- Species: R. esox

Binomial name
- Rhamphochromis esox (Boulenger, 1908)

Synonyms
- Paratilapia esox Boulenger, 1908; Champsochromis esox (Boulenger, 1908); Rhamphochromis leptosoma Regan, 1922; Rhamphochromis melanotus C. G. E. Ahl, 1926

= Rhamphochromis esox =

Species of fish

Rhamphochromis esox is a species of cichlid endemic to Lake Malawi where it prefers open waters at depths of from 2 to 65 metres (6.6 to 213.3 ft). This fish is a piscivore. This species can reach a length of 42 centimetres (17 in) SL. It can also be found in the aquarium trade.
