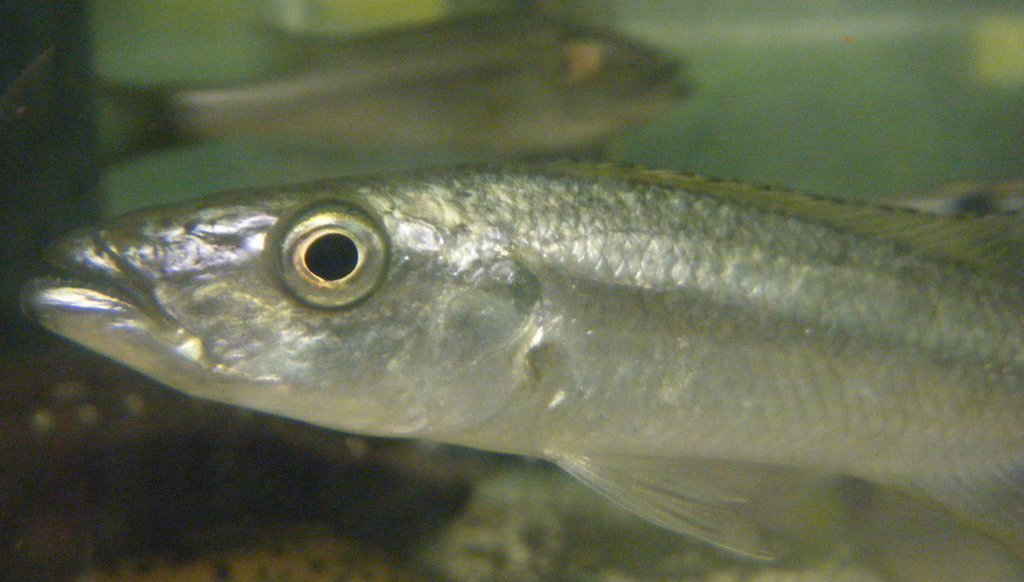

Scientific classification
- Kingdom: Animalia
- Phylum: Chordata
- Class: Actinopterygii
- Division: Teleostei
- Order: Cichliformes
- Family: Cichlidae
- Tribe: Haplochromini
- Genus: Rhamphochromis; Regan, 1922

Type species
- Hemichromis longiceps Günther, 1864

= Rhamphochromis =

Genus of fishes

Rhamphochromis is a genus of East African haplochromine cichlids endemic to the Lake Malawi basin, also including Lake Malombe, Lake Chilingali, Chia Lagoon and upper Shire River. They mainly occur in offshore open waters (down to depths of 200 m or 660 ft), but a few species also near the coast. They are piscivores that typically feed on lake sardines and small utaka cichlids.

They are elongated in shape and mainly silver or golden-silver in color, sometimes with yellow fins (especially pelvic and anal fins) and dark horizontal lines along the body. Depending on the species involved, they reach lengths of up to 28 to 45 cm (11–18 in).

Although not closely related, they have sometimes been compared to piscivorous Bathybates cichlids of Lake Tanganyika.

== Species ==
There are currently six recognized species in this genus, although the naming of these cichlids has been complicated. For example, FishBase states that Rhamphochromis lucius is almost certainly a synonym of R. woodi whereas the Catalog of Fishes states that it is a synonym of R. esox.

- Rhamphochromis esox (Boulenger, 1908)
- Rhamphochromis ferox Regan, 1922
- Rhamphochromis longiceps (Günther, 1864) (Tigerfish)
- Rhamphochromis lucius C. G. E. Ahl, 1926
- Rhamphochromis macrophthalmus Regan, 1922
- Rhamphochromis woodi Regan, 1922

The IUCN and the Catalog of Fishes recognise the following five species as valid within this genus:

- Rhamphochromis brevis Trewavas, 1935
- Rhamphochromis esox (Boulenger, 1908)
- Rhamphochromis ferox Regan, 1922
- Rhamphochromis longiceps (Günther, 1864)
- Rhamphochromis woodi Regan, 1922
