= Rhamphochromis woodi =

Conservation status
- Least Concern (IUCN 3.1)

Scientific classification
- Kingdom: Animalia
- Phylum: Chordata
- Class: Actinopterygii
- Order: Cichliformes
- Family: Cichlidae
- Genus: Rhamphochromis
- Species: R. woodi

Binomial name
- Rhamphochromis woodi Regan, 1922

Synonyms
- Rhamphochromis brevis Trewavas, 1935

Species of fish

Rhamphochromis woodi is a species of piscivorous cichlid endemic to Lake Malawi where it prefers open waters at depths of from 8 to 121 metres (26 to 397 ft). This species can reach a length of 42 centimetres (17 in) TL. It can also be found in the aquarium trade. The specific name honours Rodney C. Wood, whose collection of cichlids from Lake Malawi, which included the type of this species, was presented to the British Museum (Natural History).
