= Niels Tønder Lund =

Danish zoologist

Niels Tønder Lund (born 1749—died 1809) was a Danish zoologist.
