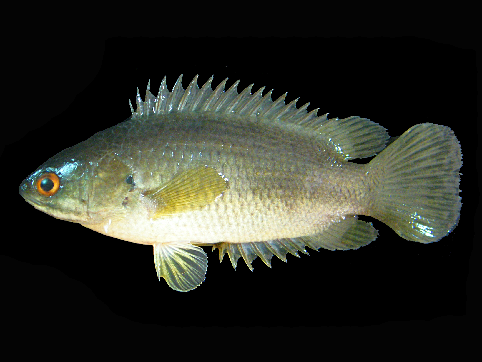

Conservation status
- Least Concern (IUCN 3.1)

Scientific classification
- Kingdom: Animalia
- Phylum: Chordata
- Class: Actinopterygii
- Division: Teleostei
- Order: Anabantiformes
- Family: Anabantidae
- Genus: Anabas
- Species: A. testudineus

Binomial name
- Anabas testudineus (Bloch, 1792)
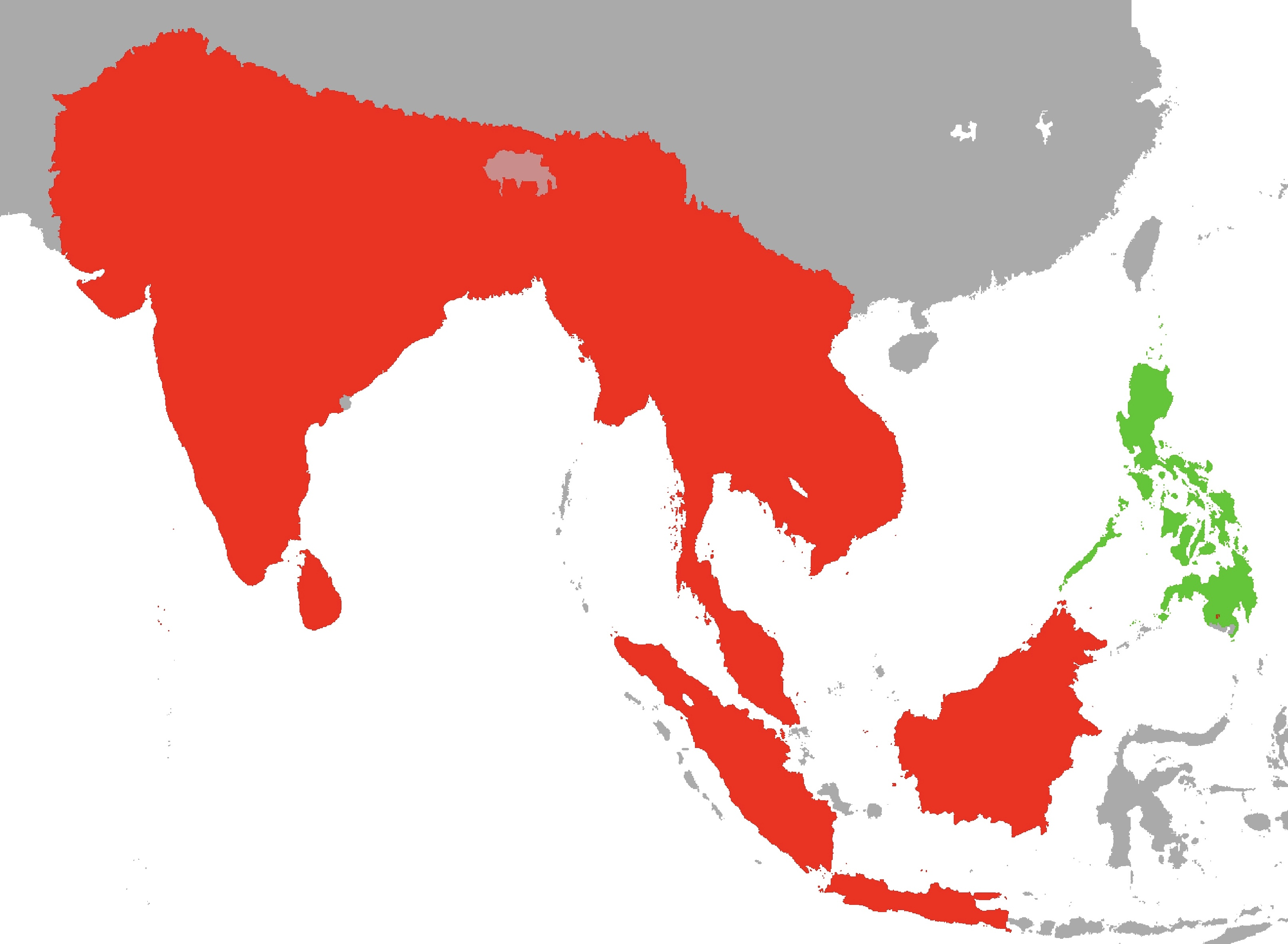
- Red: extant, Light red: possibly extant, Green: introduced

Synonyms
- Anthias testudineus Bloch, 1792; Amphiprion testudineus (Bloch, 1792); Antias testudineus (Bloch, 1792); Sparus testudineus (Bloch, 1792); Perca scandens Daldorff, 1797; Anabas scandens (Daldorff, 1797); Lutjanus scandens (Daldorff, 1797); Sparus scandens (Daldorff, 1797); Amphiprion scansor Bloch & Schneider, 1801; Lutjanus testudo Lacépède, 1802; Anabas spinosus Gray, 1834; Anabas variegatus Bleeker, 1851; Anabas macrocephalus Bleeker, 1855; Anabas microcephalus Bleeker, 1857; Anabas trifoliatus Kaup, 1860; Anabas elongatus Reuvens, 1895

= Anabas testudineus =

Climbing perch

Species of fish

The climbing perch (Anabas testudineus) is a species of amphibious freshwater fish in the family Anabantidae (the climbing gouramis). A labyrinth fish native to Far Eastern Asia, the fish inhabits freshwater systems from India, Bangladesh and Sri Lanka in the west, to Southern China in the east, and to Southeast Asia west of the Wallace Line in the south.

== Description ==
The climbing perch is euryhaline and can grow to 25 cm (9.8 in) in total length. The body is generally dark to pale green in coloration, with an olive or dusky green dorsal surface and a much paler belly. The head has longitudinal stripes on the lower cheeks, while the body has a dark spot behind the gill cover. Another spot can also sometimes be found at the base of the tail fin. Young fish have vertical stripes along the body.

Like many other labyrinth fish, it is an obligate air-breather and requires access to the water surface. They can survive extremely bad stagnant water conditions that would kill other fish. They can also survive for several days or even weeks out of water if their labyrinthine organs are kept moist, which is the source of their common name "climbing perch." During dry season, they bury themselves in mud.

== Distribution ==
The climbing perch is native to South Asia and Southeast Asia west of the Wallace Line; including India (including the Andaman Islands), Sri Lanka, Bangladesh, Nepal, Myanmar, Laos Thailand, southern China (including Hong Kong), Cambodia, Indonesia, Malaysia, Singapore, and Vietnam. It is usually recorded as introduced to the Philippines, but museum specimens dating all the way back to 1901 make it likely that it is actually also native there. Other authors also list it as native to Pakistan, Taiwan, and Timor-Leste.

Outside its native ranges, it is an invasive species. It can live without water for 6–10 hours and move on land by crawling/wriggling the body with its pectoral fins. It is believed that the fish may be invading new territories by slipping aboard fishing boats. The fish has been established in some islands east of the Wallace Line, in eastern Indonesia and Papua New Guinea, and is also believed to be advancing toward Northern Australia. In late 2005, the fish was discovered on Saibai Island and another small Australian island in the Torres Strait in northern Queensland, about three to four miles south of Papua New Guinea.

== Taxonomy ==
This species was first described by Marcus Elieser Bloch in 1792.

It is likely that Anabas testudineus is a species complex, with the binomial name applied to what are actually several different species. With further study, populations of this fish may be divided up into separate species and given new names.

== As food ==
The climbing perch is important as a food fish in certain regions of South Asia and Southeast Asia, where its ability to survive out of the water for extended periods of time, provided it is kept moist, improves its marketability.

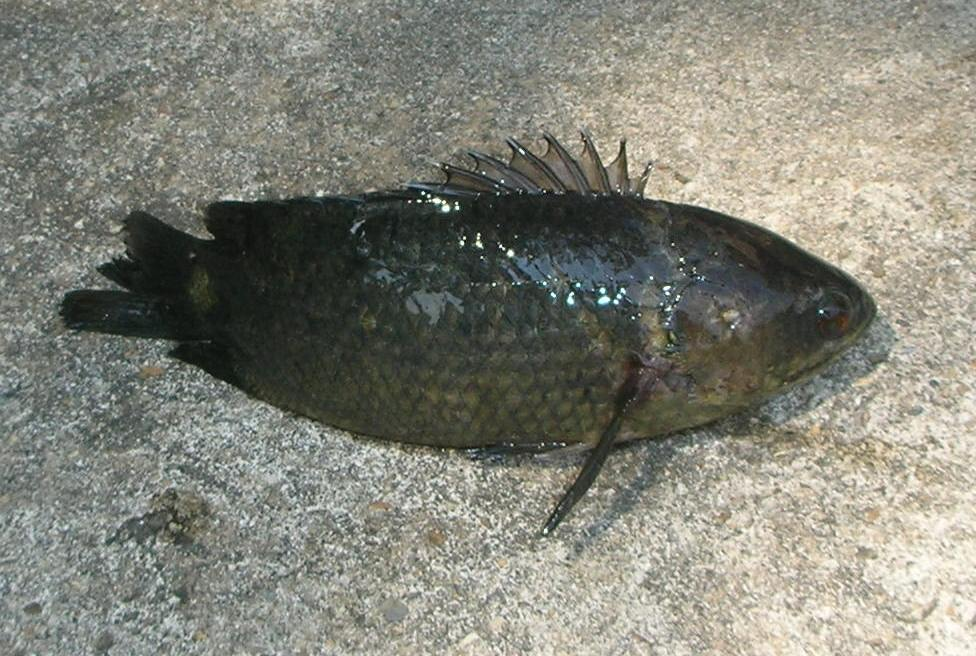
Pla mo at a riverside market in Ratchaburi Province, Thailand

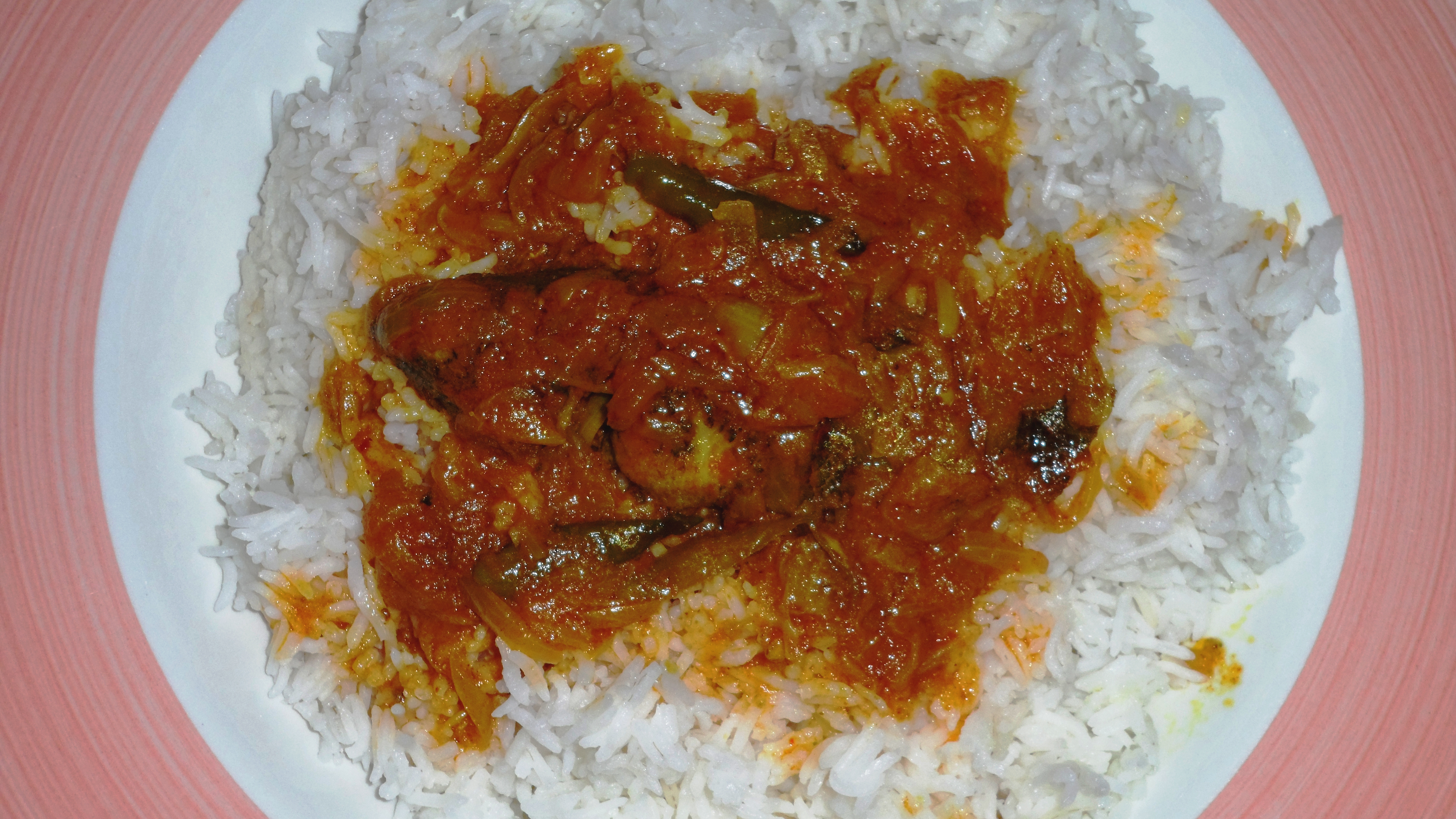
Anabas testudineus curry preparation

== In faith ==
In Thailand, the climbing perch can be found throughout every region and every type of water resource, it is normally consumed as food. In the beliefs of Thais, it is believed that if this species of fish is released it will help ward off disease. Because its common name in Thai is pla mo (ปลาหมอ, pronounced [plāː mɔ̌ː]), literally translated as "physician fish".

== See also ==
- List of Thai ingredients
