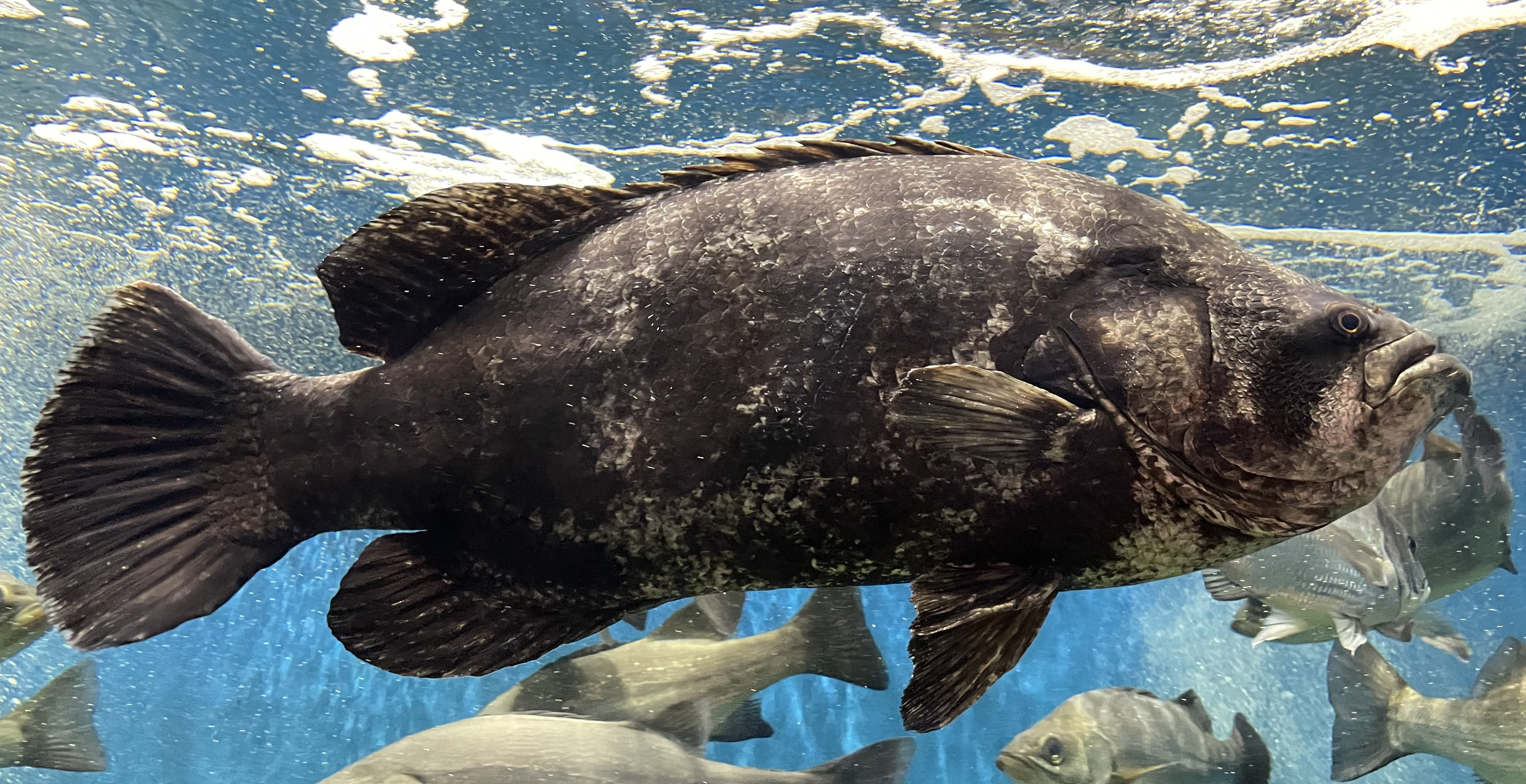
- Atlantic tripletail (Lobotes surinamensis)

Scientific classification
- Kingdom: Animalia
- Phylum: Chordata
- Class: Actinopterygii
- Division: Teleostei
- Order: Acanthuriformes
- Family: Lobotidae; Gill, 1861

Genera
- See text

= Lobotidae =

Family of fishes

Lobotidae is a family of ray-finned fishes that includes the tripletails, which are circumtropical marine fishes, and tiger perches, which are Asian freshwater fishes. The family is placed in the order Spariformes in the 5th edition of Fishes of the World but this classification and the taxa included within the family is not agreed on by all workers.

== Taxonomy ==
Lobotidae was first proposed as a family in 1861 by the American biologist Theodore Gill. The 5th edition of Fishes of the World classifies the Lobotidae within the order Spariformes and provisionally includes the genus Datnioides in the family. Other workers have included a third genus, Hapalogenys in the Lobotidae. However, yet more workers place these three taxa in monotypic families within the order Lobotiformes in the series Eupercaria.

== Genera ==
Lobotidae contains the following genera:

- Hapalogenys J. Richardson, 1844
- Lobotes Cuvier, 1830 (Triplefins)
- Datnioides Bleeker, 1853 (Tiger perches)

== Characteristics ==
Lobotidae have toothless palatines and vomers. They have a rounded caudal fin similar to that of cichlids, while the extended posterior lobes on the rear dorsal fin and anal fin give the impression of having three tails. The dorsal fins are supported by a total of 12 spines and 15 or 16 soft rays. The maximum size of these fishes varies from a standard length of 32 cm (13 in) for the New Guinea tiger perch (Datnioides campbelli) to a total length of 110 cm (43 in) in the Atlantic tripletail (Lobotes surinamensis). The juveniles camouflage themselves by floating on their sides and resembling fallen leaves.

== Distribution and habitat ==
Lobotidae are tropical and subtropical fishes, the triplefins are marine fishes with a pantropical distribution, while the tiger perches are freshwater and brackish waters fishes of rivers and estuaries in south and southeast Asia and New Guinea.
