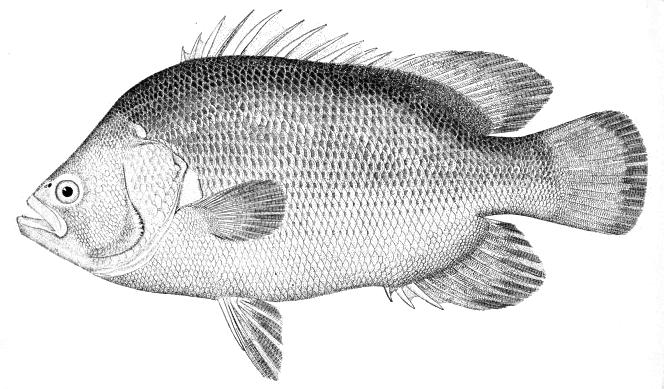
- Atlantic tripletail (Lobotes surinamensis)

Scientific classification
- Kingdom: Animalia
- Phylum: Chordata
- Class: Actinopterygii
- Order: Acanthuriformes
- Family: Lobotidae; T. N. Gill, 1861
- Genus: Lobotes; G. Cuvier, 1830

Type species
- Holocentrus surinamensis Bloch, 1790

Synonyms
- Verrugato Jordan, 1923

= Lobotes =

Tripletail

Genus of fishes

Lobotes is a genus of ray-finned fishes belonging to the family Lobotidae known as the tripletails. These fishes are found in subtropical and tropical waters in all oceans.

== Taxonomy ==
Lobotes was first proposed as a genus in 1830 by the French zoologist Georges Cuvier with Holocentrus surinamensis, originally described by Marcus Elieser Bloch in 1790 from Suriname, as its type species. Some authorities treat Lobotes as a monospecific genus with L. pacifica being regarded as a synonym of a single pantropical L. surinamensis. Lobotes is one of two genera in the family Lobotidae which the 5th edition of Fishes of the World classifies in the order Spariformes.

== Species ==
The currently recognized species in this genus are:

- Lobotes pacifica C. H. Gilbert, 1898 (Pacific tripletail)
- Lobotes surinamensis (Bloch, 1790) (Atlantic tripletail)

== Characteristics ==
Lobotes species are characterised by having a rather compressed rectangular body with a slightly protruding upper jaw. They do not have any vomerine or palatine teeth. The preoperculum has serrations along its edge and the operculum has two flat spines hidden in the skin. The dorsal fin is supported by 12 robust spines and 15 or 16 soft rays and is continuous. The anal fin contains 3 spines and 11 soft rays. The soft rayed parts of the dorsal and anal fins are high and have rounded ends reaching past the caudal peduncle to resemble additional tails. The pectoral fins are shorter than the pelvic fins and the caudal fin is rounded. Ctenoid scales cover the body, including the base of the dorsal and anal fins, although they are not present on the cheek. Of the two species the Atlantic tripletail has a slightly longer maximum published total length of 110 cm (43 in) than the Pacific tripletail’s at 100 cm (39 in).

== Distribution and habitat ==
Lobotes tripletails are found in warm waters throughout the world. They are coastal fishes and can be found in estuaries, bays and inlets and will often be found around man-made objects, typically singly but they will school at times. Juveniles often float among Sargasssum weed.
