= List of brackish aquarium fish species =

This is a list of commonly seen fish that can be kept in a brackish water aquarium.

== Cyprinodontiformes ==
Common name	Taxonomy	Picture	Tank type	Remarks
Poeciliids
Guppy	Poecilia reticulata		Community	Many color and tail pattern varieties exist, also can tolerate above ocean level salt. Normally freshwater.
Black molly	Poecilia sphenops		Community	Aquarium fish
Sailfin molly	Poecilia latipinna		Community	Gold and silver varieties commonly found.
Others
Four-eyed fish	Anableps spp.			These fish can see above and below water.
Diamond killifish	Fundulus xenicus			
Gulf killifish	Fundulus grandis			
Striped mummichog	Fundulus majalis			
Longnose killifish	Fundulus similis			
American Flagfish	Jordanella floridae		Community	May eat hair algae, but also may eat plants.

== Catfish ==
Common name	Taxonomy	Picture	Size	Remarks	Salinity
Sea catfish
Colombian shark catfish	Hexanematichthys seemanni			Species of fish	
Australian shark catfish	Arius graeffei				
Berney's shark catfish	Arius berneyi			Species of fish	

== Pufferfish ==
Common name	Taxonomy	Picture	Size	Remarks	Salinity
Common Toadfish, Toado	Tetractenos hamiltoni		4"	Rarely seen in the aquarium trade, even in Australia, where it is native. Adaptable to a wide range of conditions and habitats, from marginal, polluted freshwater-brackish creeks to fully marine seagrass flats, as long as the habitat is sheltered from strong currents.	
Figure 8 pufferfish	Tetraodon biocellatus		4"	Requires brackish aquarium conditions with very low Nitrite and Nitrate levels to be kept successfully. Freshwater compromises immune system, harms puffer, and shortens life extremely. Commonly kept in freshwater.	
Green spotted puffer	Tetraodon nigroviridis		6"	Often sold as freshwater fish, but this species actually thrives in brackish water. As the fish matures, it requires the salinity levels to slowly increase with age. Must be kept in aquarium with very low Nitrite and Nitrate levels to be kept successfully. A highly varied diet is a necessary requirement for this species. Prawns, muscle meat, mysid, squid and aquatic snails are all relished. Provide Shelled food to naturally trim the puffers constantly growing teeth.	1.008-1.018

== Gobies ==
Common name	Taxonomy	Picture	Size	Remarks	Salinity
Bumblebee goby	Brachygobius xanthozonus		1.5"	Often a picky eater. Will accept thawed frozen brine shrimp or mysis shrimp. Can be outcompeted for food by more aggressive fish.	
Water Cow	Eleotris picta		17"		
Violet goby, Dragon goby	Gobioides broussonnetii		21"	Though pet stores often label as "vicious" this fish is actually quite harmless	
Barred mudskipper	Periophthalmus argentilineatus		6"	This fish requires "land" to crawl out of the water.	
Atlantic mudskipper	Periophthalmus barbarus		9"	This fish requires "land" to crawl out of the water.	
Knight goby	Stigmatogobius sadanundio		3.5"	Species of goby indigenous to South Asia	

== Cichlids ==
Common name	Taxonomy	Picture	Size	Remarks	Salinity
Blackchin tilapia	Sarotherodon melanotheron		11"	Species of ray-finned fish	
Orange chromide	Etroplus maculatus		3"	Species of fish endemic to Southern India and Sri Lanka	
Green chromide	Etroplus suratensis		15"	Species of fish	
Mayan cichlid or Mexican mojarra	Mayaheros urophthalmus		39.4 cm	Species of large cichlid fish from Middle America	0 – 40 ppt

== Acanthuriformes ==
Common name	Taxonomy	Picture	Size	Remarks	Salinity
Siamese tigerfish	Datnioides microlepis		18"	These fish must be kept in large aquaria.	
New Guinea tigerfish	Datnioides campbelli		13"	These fish must be kept in large aquaria.	
Silver moony	Monodactylus argenteus		10"	These fish are also known from marine habitats.	
African moony	Monodactylus sebae		10"	These fish are also known from marine habitats.	
Green Scat, Ruby Scat	Scatophagus argus		15"	A ravenous herbivore that quickly defoliates any aquatic plants in the aquarium. One of the few common brackish water plants in the trade, the Java Fern (Microsorum pteropus) appears to be toxic to these fish and should not be planted with "scats".	

== Beloniformes ==
Common name	Taxonomy	Picture	Size	Remarks	Salinity
Indian ricefish	Oryzias dancena		1.2"	A coastal ricefish occurring in low-salinity estuarine habitat. Species-only sites in the same field survey measured 0.9–8.3 ppt.	0.9–8.3 ppt (recorded sites)
Javanese ricefish	Oryzias javanicus		1.8"	A coastal ricefish normally found in brackish habitats. A field survey found it at species-only sites with salinities of 10.5–30.0 ppt.	10.5–30.0 ppt (recorded sites)
Estuarine halfbeak	Zenarchopterus dispar		7.5"	Inhabits shallow water around mangroves in sheltered bays.	
Duncker's halfbeak	Zenarchopterus dunckeri		5.5"	A typical estuarine fish that prefers brackish water; long-term maintenance at 5–15 g/L salt is recommended.	5–15 g/L

== Other fish ==
Common name	Taxonomy	Picture	Size	Remarks	Salinity
Indian glassy fish	Parambassis ranga		3.1"	These fish are often dyed.	
Targetfish, Jarbua terapon	Terapon jarbua		14"	These fish breed in saltwater and the young return to freshwater.	
Banded archerfish	Toxotes jaculatrix		12"	These fish have the ability to shoot water to hit their insect prey.	
Hogchoker	Trinectes maculatus		3"	Often sold under the misnomers "Freshwater Flounder" or "Freshwater Fluke", but is in fact a brackish water if not marine fish	

== See also ==
- List of brackish aquarium invertebrate species
- List of brackish aquarium plant species
- List of fish common names
- List of aquarium fish by scientific name
- List of freshwater aquarium fish species
- List of freshwater aquarium plant species
- List of freshwater aquarium amphibian species
- List of marine aquarium fish species
