= List of brackish aquarium invertebrate species =

This is a list of various species of invertebrates, animals without a backbone, that are commonly found in brackish aquariums kept by hobby aquarists. Some species are intentionally collected for their desirable aesthetic characteristics. Others are kept to serve a functional role such as consuming algae in the aquarium. Some species are present only incidentally or are pest species.

== Arthropods ==
=== Crustaceans ===
Fiddler Crab, Uca pugnax
Perisesarma bidens, Red Clawed Crab

Amano Shrimp/Yamato Shrimp, Caridina multidentata

Grass Shrimp/Glass Shrimp, Palaemonetes paludosus

Blue Crab, Callinectes sapidus

== Mollusca ==
=== Gastropods ===
Olive Nerite, Vittina usnea

== Cephalopods ==
Lolliguncula is the only genus of cephalopods that is known to exist in brackish water. They can tolerate as low as 8.5 PPM of salt.

- Subgenus Loliopsis
  - Dart squid, Lolliguncula diomedea
- Subgenus Lolliguncula
  - Argus brief squid or Argus thumbstall squid, Lolliguncula argus
  - Atlantic brief squid or Atlantic thumbstall squid, Lolliguncula brevis
  - Panama brief squid or Panama thumbstall squid, Lolliguncula panamensis
