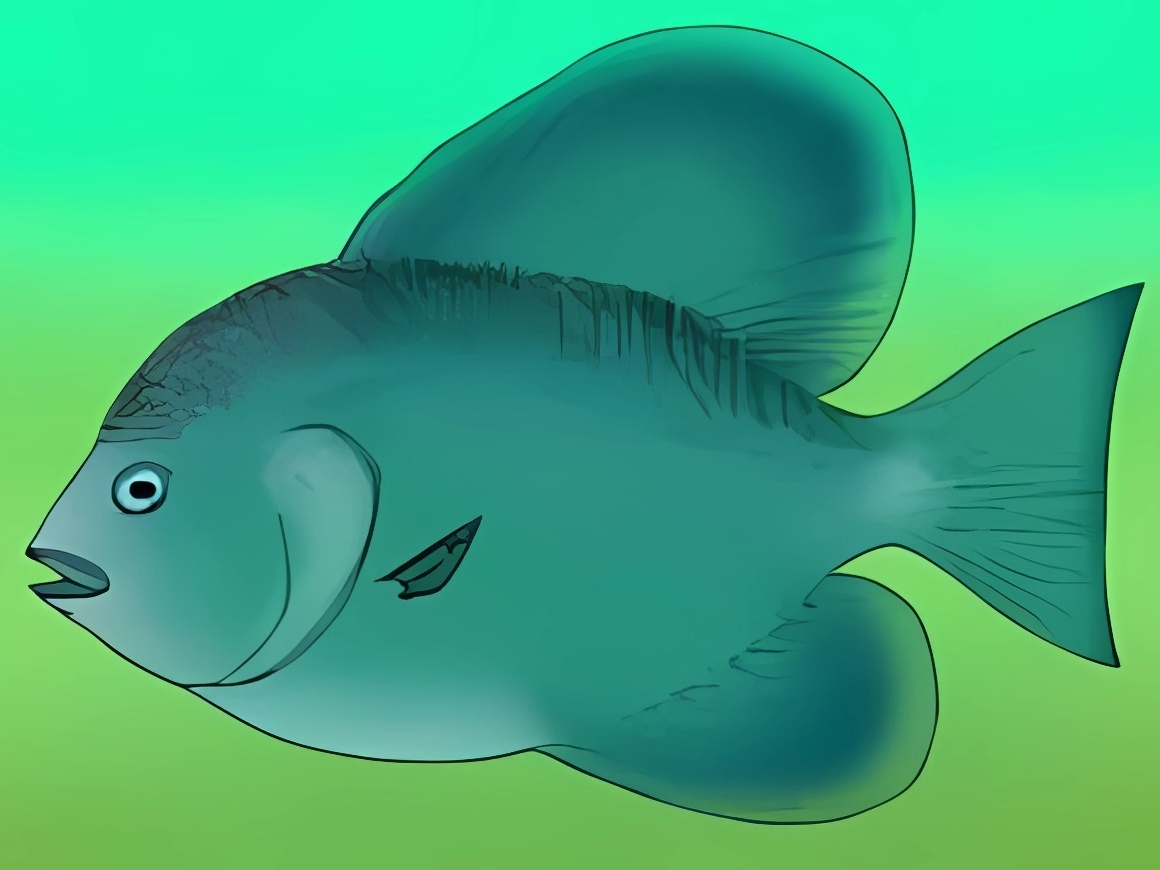
- Artist's reconstruction

Scientific classification
- Domain: Eukaryota
- Kingdom: Animalia
- Phylum: Chordata
- Class: Actinopterygii
- Order: Acanthuriformes
- Family: Monodactylidae
- Genus: †Psettopsis; Blot, 1969
- Species: †P. subarcuatus

Binomial name
- †Psettopsis subarcuatus Blot, 1969

= Psettopsis =

Psettopsis Temporal range: Lutetian

Extinct genus of fishes

Psettopsis subarcuatus is an extinct prehistoric species of moonyfish that lived during the Lutetian epoch of Monte Bolca, Italy.

It had large, rounded dorsal and anal fins, and was a comparatively large fish, being about 45 centimeters long, much larger than its relative, Pasaichthys.

== See also ==
- Pasaichthys
- Prehistoric fish
- List of prehistoric bony fish
