= Brackish-water aquarium =

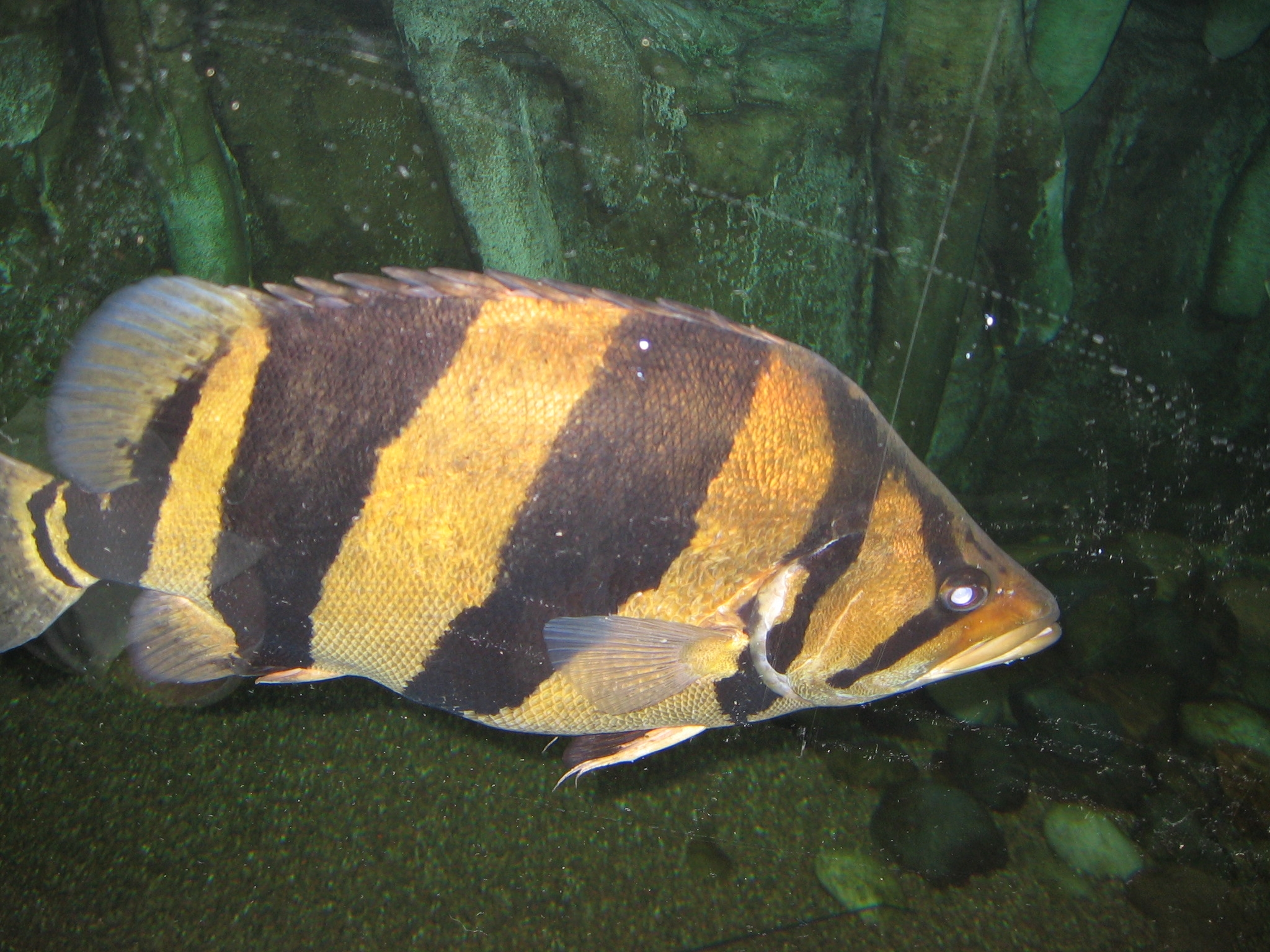
A brackish water fish: Siamese tigerfish, Datnioides pulcher

A brackish-water aquarium is an aquarium where the water is brackish (semi-salty). The range of "saltiness" varies greatly, from near freshwater to near marine and is often referred to as specific gravity (SG) or salinity. Brackish water aquaria is a popular specialization within the fishkeeping hobby. Many species of fish traded as freshwater species are actually true brackish species, for example mollies, Florida flagfish, and some cichlids such as chromides and black-chin tilapia. There are also several popular species traded purely as brackish water fish, including monos, scats, archerfish, and various species of pufferfish, goby, flatfish, and gar. Generally, aquarists need to maintain a specific gravity of around 1.005 to 1.010 depending on the species being kept, but practically all brackish water fish tolerate variations in salinity well, and some aquarists maintain that regularly fluctuating the salinity in the aquarium actually keeps the fish healthy and free of parasites.

== Aquarium maintenance ==
Brackish water species can be kept mainly the same as standard freshwater aquaria, but a hydrometer is used to check the salinity of the water. Certain kinds of brackish water fish need to have their salinity increased slightly every six months. The tank sizes can vary widely depending on the needs of the particular species, and the temperature is usually in the tropical range of 76-82 °F. The substrate can vary from sand to gravel, but many aquarists choose crushed coral or aragonite sand, both of which help raise the hardness and pH to an acceptable level. Many brackish water fish, as any fish, can jump out of the tank, so it must be covered. Some brackish water species come from estuaries. These should have a slow moving current and some hiding places in their aquarium. Some come from larger rivers. These should have plants around the perimeter of the aquarium with some large rocks to rest on. Others come from mangrove swamps. These should have a few mangrove plants, and some species should have a beach to climb out on. Some freshwater species (and the blacktip shark, a marine species) are hardy enough or survive better in brackish water, such as Polypterus bichir, certain loaches, Danio rerio, all kinds of mollies but especially the Yucatán molly, and some gobies. All can tolerate the same amount of salt in aquaria, but should be acclimated slowly.

== See also ==
- Aquarium
- Brackish water
- Fishkeeping
- List of brackish aquarium fish species
- List of brackish aquarium invertebrate species
