= Brachygobius kabiliensis =

Conservation status
- Least Concern (IUCN 3.1)

Scientific classification
- Kingdom: Animalia
- Phylum: Chordata
- Class: Actinopterygii
- Order: Gobiiformes
- Family: Oxudercidae
- Genus: Brachygobius
- Species: B. kabiliensis

Binomial name
- Brachygobius kabiliensis Inger, 1958

Species of goby fish

Brachygobius kabiliensis, commonly known as the kabili bumblebee goby, is a species of goby.

== Habitat ==
Inhabits both fresh and brackish water. It is generally restricted to lowland, coastal environments, including mangrove swamps, estuaries, and tidal streams.

== Distribution ==
The species has a Southeast Asia distribution and is native to Cambodia, Indonesia (Kalimantan), Malaysia (Peninsular Malaysia, Sabah, Sarawak), Singapore, Thailand, and Vietnam.
