= Stigmatogobius elegans =

Scientific classification
- Domain: Eukaryota
- Kingdom: Animalia
- Phylum: Chordata
- Class: Actinopterygii
- Order: Gobiiformes
- Family: Oxudercidae
- Genus: Stigmatogobius
- Species: S. elegans

Binomial name
- Stigmatogobius elegans Larson, 2005

Species of fish

Stigmatogobius elegans is a species of fish in the goby family, Gobiidae. It is found in Luzon, Philippines.
