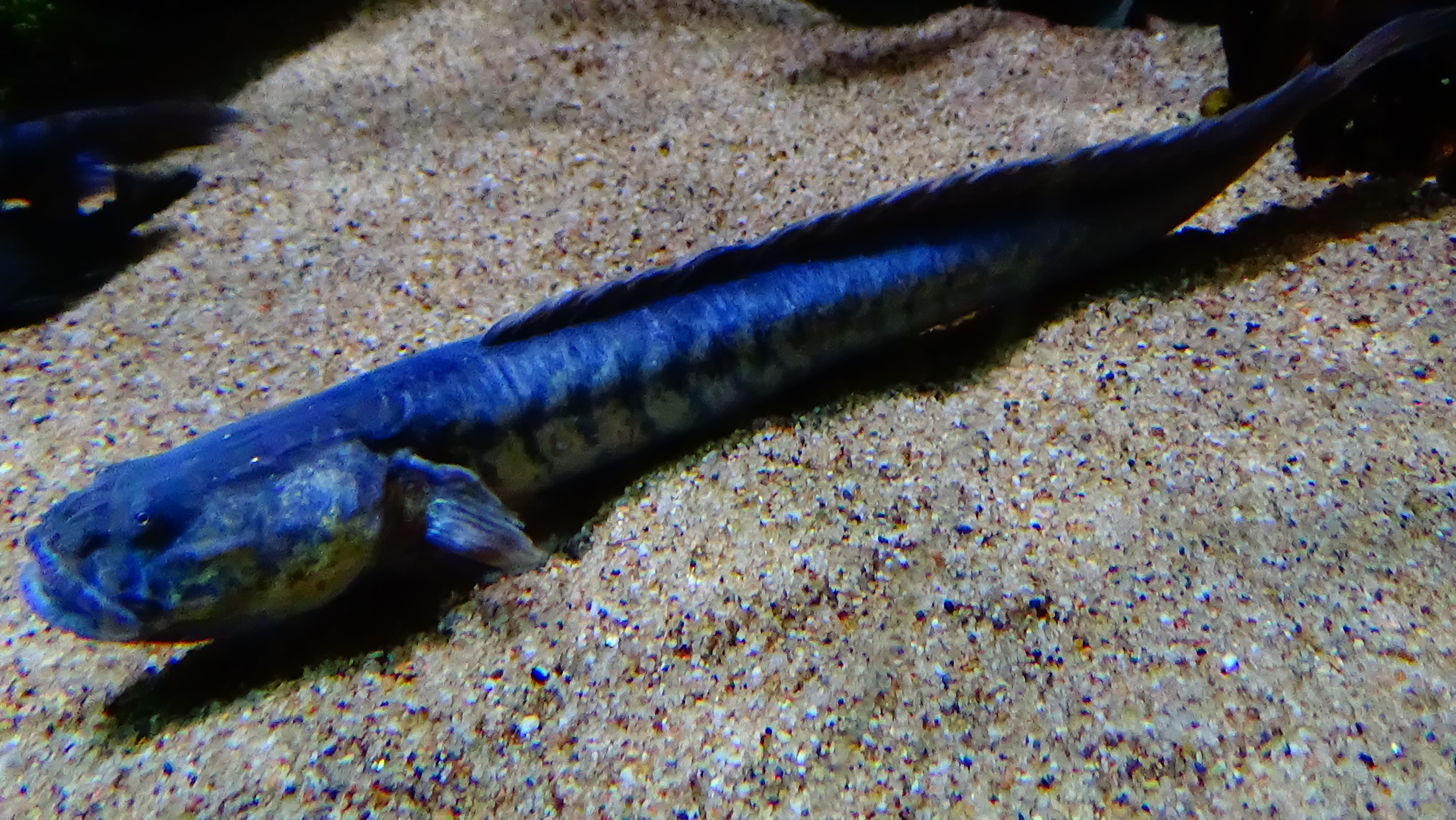

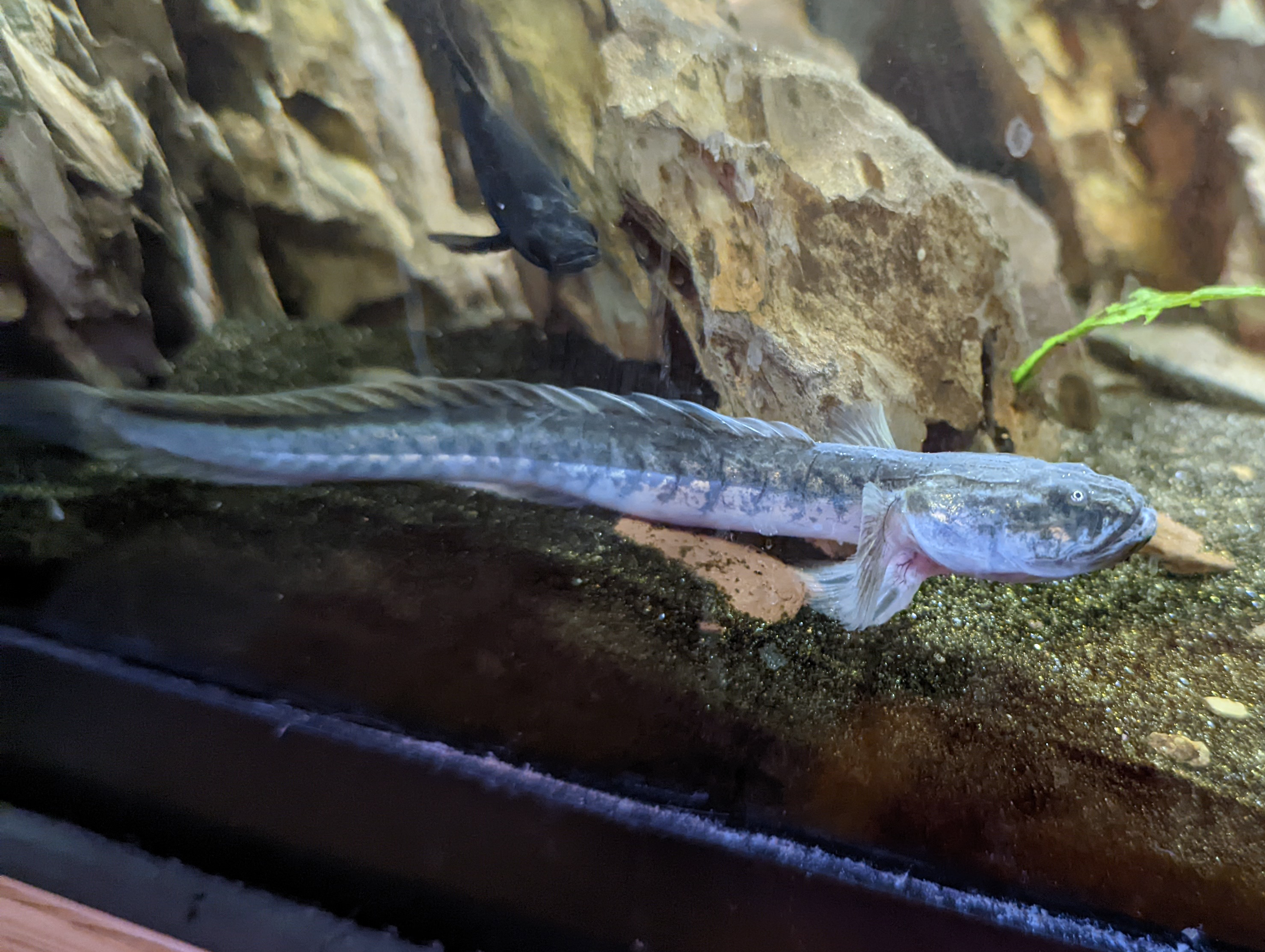

Conservation status
- Least Concern (IUCN 3.1)

Scientific classification
- Kingdom: Animalia
- Phylum: Chordata
- Class: Actinopterygii
- Division: Teleostei
- Order: Gobiiformes
- Family: Oxudercidae
- Genus: Gobioides
- Species: G. broussonnetii

Binomial name
- Gobioides broussonnetii Lacépède, 1800

Synonyms
- Amblyopus broussonetii (Lacepède, 1800); Cepola striata Bloch & J. G. Schneider, 1801; Gobius brasiliensis Bloch & J. G. Schneider, 1801; Amblyopus brasiliensis (Bloch & J. G. Schneider, 1801); Gobius oblongus J. G. Schneider, 1801; Cepola unicolor Gronow, 1854; Gobioides barreto Poey, 1860; Amblyopus mexicanus O'Shaughnessy, 1875; Cayennia guichenoti Sauvage, 1880

= Violet goby =

Species of fish

The violet goby (Gobioides broussonnetii) is a species of goby native to marine, fresh and brackish waters near the Atlantic coast of North and South America from South Carolina in the United States, to northern Brazil. It prefers bays, estuaries and river mouths with muddy substrates. It is found in the aquarium trade, where it is often marketed as dragon goby or dragon fish.

== Description ==
The violet goby has a long, slender, eel-like body. Its dorsal and anal fins run almost the entire length of the body. The teeth are very sharp; however these are used for scraping algae off rocks, not fighting. When kept in good condition, dragon gobies develop an attractive, iridescent, silvery-blue metallic color with a gold blotch pattern. Violet gobies seen in pet stores are generally 3 to 5 inches (7.6–12.7 cm) long. In the wild, violet gobies can grow to 24 inches (61 cm) long. However, in captivity they seldom grow past 15 inches (38 cm). Males tend to have long, pointed genital papilla, while that of the females are shorter, blunt, and yellow in color.

== Habitat and feeding ==
Violet gobies usually inhabit brackish swamps, streams, and estuaries with a muddy substrate. They have very small eyes, and as such are primarily scavengers.

== Aquarium care ==
Its commercial trade name is "dragon goby" or "dragon fish". Information offered in pet stores is often misleading; this species has specialized requirements and will die in a standard aquarium. Violet gobies require brackish water at least one-quarter the strength of seawater. A single individual needs a tank at least four feet long with a floor of sand or silt at least three inches thick (they spend much time buried in the substrate). They are territorial with their own kind and cannot be kept together in a standard-sized tank. They cannot compete with common aquarium fish such as tetras and barbs and are unsuitable for a community tank. Individuals are usually wild-caught, and may have trouble learning to eat commercial fish foods. They feed mostly on filamentous algae, and in captivity must have access to vegetable food such as spirulina flakes or algae wafers. It is often sold as a "highly aggressive" fish, but violet gobies are actually quite docile, and nearly blind.

=== Popularity, availability, and hardiness ===
This is not a very common fish among hobbyists, perhaps because it is hard to find, both commercially and in the tank. Dragon gobies tend to disappear from the market for long periods of time, but are easier to find in stores within their natural range. Meanwhile, they often hide all day, coming out only when the lights are out and owners asleep. As noted above, they are often described by local fish stores as aggressive, capable of eating any fish that fits in their mouth, when in fact they are scavengers.

=== Behaviour and aggression in captivity ===
Despite its fierce looks, large mouth, and many teeth, the violet goby is a predator-scavenger. If well fed, it usually will not bother smaller fish. Any small, peaceful, brackish water-tolerant fish can coexist with violet gobies, so examples include mollies, guppies, swordtails, platies, bumblebee gobies and glassfishes. The violet goby is only kept with peaceful fish, as it has poor eyesight and may be bullied by more boisterous fish. However, if two violet gobies exist in a tank too small, one will eventually claim the entire area their own territory and fiercely defend it.

=== Temperature, pH, and salinity ===
Violet gobies are generally healthy at temperatures between 76 and 78 °F (24 and 26 °C), with a pH between 6.5–8.5, and salinity at 1.006–1.008.

=== Feeding ===
Violet gobies are scavengers in the wild and need a varied diet for optimum health. They eat both animal and plant-based foods, such as frozen blood worms, frozen tubifex worms, baby brine shrimp, and vegetable flakes. It is worth noting that the foods they eat are limited by two factors. Firstly, despite having huge tooth-filled mouths, these fish actually have very small throats. And secondly, because of their poor eyesight, violet gobies cannot compete with other fish to find food. It is also worth noting that violet gobies often feed at night.

=== Breeding ===
They typically spawn in a group of one male and three or more females. Females require many hiding places, while the male needs a site to build his nest. Spawning is triggered by feeding on live meaty foods, and a decrease in salinity from 7 parts per thousand (1.006–1.008sg) to around 5 parts per thousand (1.004), followed by an increase to 30 parts per thousand (close to regular marine salinity, about 1.023sg). The male spawns with several females over the course of a day. After spawning, the male guards the eggs. After 1.5–2 days, the eggs hatch. Fry eat infusoria (particularly rotifers) and "green water" (single celled algae) for up to a month. They then eat baby brine shrimp nauplii.

=== Diseases ===
Dragon gobies are susceptible to many common aquarium illnesses, such as Columnaris and fin rot; which are bacterial infections that spread across the skin and fins of the fish. They are usually treated with antibacterial or antibiotic medications.
