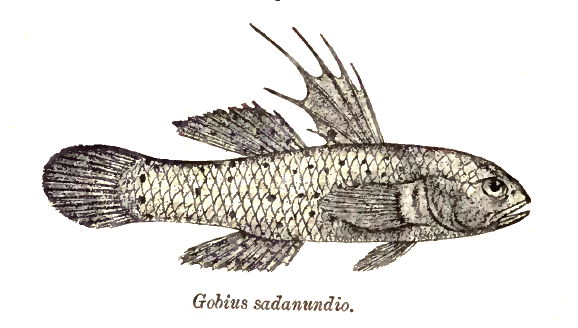
- Stigmatogobius sadanundio

Scientific classification
- Kingdom: Animalia
- Phylum: Chordata
- Class: Actinopterygii
- Order: Gobiiformes
- Family: Oxudercidae
- Subfamily: Gobionellinae
- Genus: Stigmatogobius; Bleeker, 1874

Type species
- Gobius pleurostigma Bleeker, 1849

Species
- 7-8, see text

= Stigmatogobius =

Genus of fishes

Stigmatogobius is a genus of fish in the goby subfamily, Gobionellinae. It is distributed in the Indo-Pacific region, specifically the Indo-Malayan zone. Species can be found along the substrate or hiding in plant litter in freshwater habitat, and sometimes in estuary habitat, such as mangrove stands.

Several species are of commercial importance as aquarium pets. In the trade they are known generally as knight gobies, and the individual species are often confused and misidentified.

The genus is characterized and distinguished from other gobionellines by characters such as the transverse arrangement of sensory papillae, the number of fin rays and scales, and the shape of the tongue, gut, and genital papilla. The fish are mainly pale-colored with dark spots or a dark bar.

== Species ==
There are seven or eight species in the genus:

- Stigmatogobius borneensis (Bleeker, 1850)
- Stigmatogobius elegans Larson, 2005
- Stigmatogobius pleurostigma (Bleeker, 1849)
- Stigmatogobius sadanundio (F. Hamilton, 1822)
- Stigmatogobius sella (Steindachner, 1881)
- Stigmatogobius signifer Larson, 2005
- Stigmatogobius yanamensis Visweswara Rao, 1971
