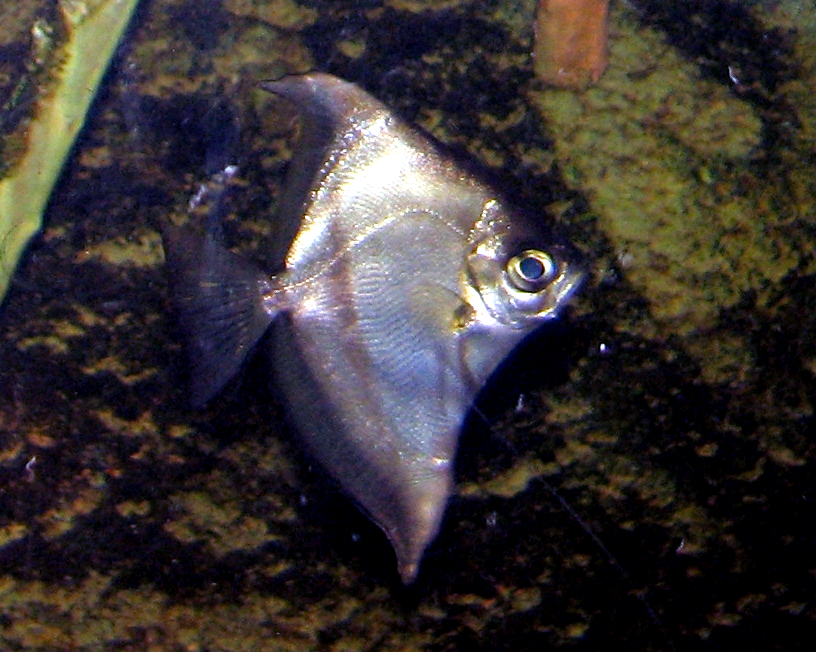

Scientific classification
- Domain: Eukaryota
- Kingdom: Animalia
- Phylum: Chordata
- Class: Actinopterygii
- Order: Acanthuriformes
- Family: Monodactylidae
- Genus: Monodactylus
- Species: M. sebae

Binomial name
- Monodactylus sebae (G. Cuvier, 1829)

Synonyms
- Chaetodon rhombeus Bloch & J. G. Schneider, 1801 (ambiguous); Psettus sebae G. Cuvier, 1829; Psettias sebae (G. Cuvier, 1829)

= Monodactylus sebae =

Species of ray-finned fish

Monodactylus sebae, the African moony, is a species of moonyfish native to fresh, brackish and marine waters from the eastern Atlantic, ranging from the Canary Islands down to Angola. It inhabits mangrove swamps and estuaries and can occasionally be found in lagoons. This species can reach a length of 25 centimetres (9.8 in) TL though most do not exceed 15 centimetres (5.9 in). It can also be found in the aquarium trade.

== In the aquarium ==
This species is quite widely kept in brackish and saltwater water aquaria; although it has only very rarely been bred in captivity, it is otherwise hardy and easy to care for.
