= Lolliguncula diomedeae =

Conservation status
- Data Deficient (IUCN 3.1)

Scientific classification
- Kingdom: Animalia
- Phylum: Mollusca
- Class: Cephalopoda
- Order: Myopsida
- Family: Loliginidae
- Genus: Lolliguncula
- Species: L. diomedeae

Binomial name
- Lolliguncula diomedeae (Hoyle, 1904)

Species of squid

Lolligunculae diomedeae, commonly known as the dart squid or shortarm gonate squid, is a species of squid in the family Loliginidae. It is found in the eastern Pacific.

== Description ==
L. diomedeae has a long, cylindrical mantle reaching about 13.5 cm in length in females and 6.5 cm in males, with short and broad fins which have slight notches at their anterior points. The arms are unequal. The first pair of arms (1.5 cm in length) are slender with distinct dorsal keels, the third (2.5 cm) are broad and flattened, and the second (1.8 cm) and fourth (2.5 cm) pairs are both stout. Tentacles are small and slender, and reach about 4.7 cm.

On average, females weigh 25.6 grams, while males weigh 12 grams.

== Biology ==
Egg masses contain 20-30 soft, translucent egg capsules. Capsules are up to 8.5 cm in length, and contain about 70 eggs.
