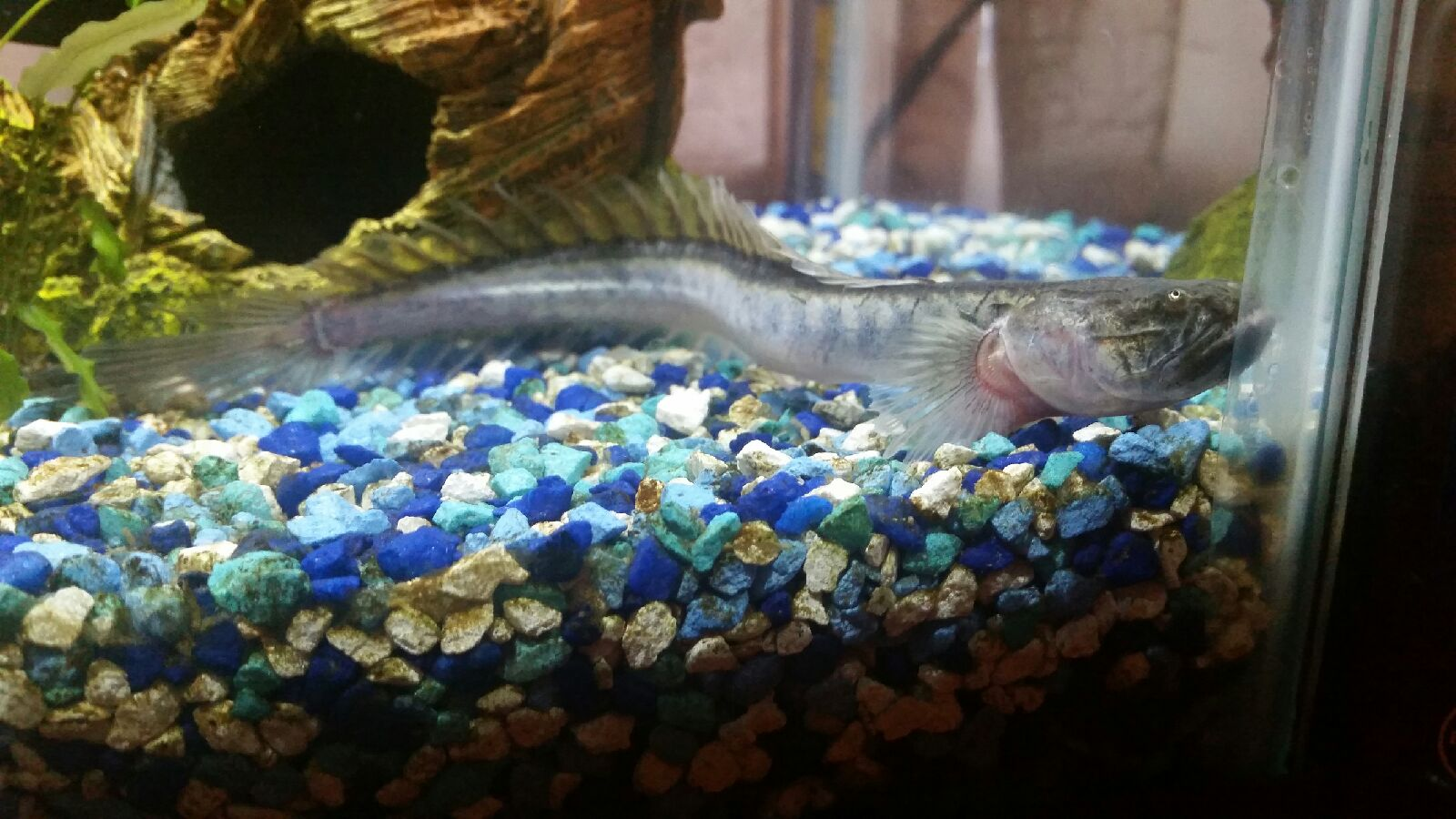
- A Gobioides broussonnetii

Scientific classification
- Kingdom: Animalia
- Phylum: Chordata
- Class: Actinopterygii
- Division: Teleostei
- Order: Gobiiformes
- Family: Oxudercidae
- Subfamily: Gobionellinae
- Genus: Gobioides; Lacépède, 1800

Type species
- Gobioides broussonnetii Lacépède, 1800

Synonyms
- Cayennia Sauvage, 1880; Ognichodes Swainson, 1839; Paratyntlastes Giltay, 1935; Plecopodus Rafinesque, 1815; Tyntlastes Günther, 1862

= Gobioides =

Genus of fishes

Gobioides is a genus of gobies native to marine, fresh and brackish waters along the coasts of the Atlantic Ocean and in fresh waters of the Pacific coast of the Americas.

== Species ==
There are currently five recognized species in this genus:

- Gobioides africanus (Giltay, 1935)
- Gobioides broussonnetii Lacépède, 1800 (Violet goby)
- Gobioides grahamae G. Palmer & Wheeler, 1955
- Gobioides peruanus (Steindachner, 1880) (Peruvian eelgoby)
- Gobioides sagitta (Günther, 1862)
