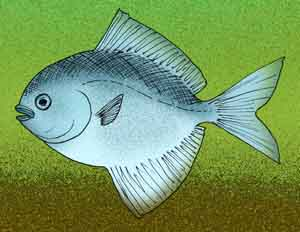
- Artist's reconstruction

Scientific classification
- Domain: Eukaryota
- Kingdom: Animalia
- Phylum: Chordata
- Class: Actinopterygii
- Order: Acanthuriformes
- Family: Monodactylidae
- Genus: †Pasaichthys; Blot, 1969

Type species
- Pasaichthys pleuronectiformis Blot, 1969

= Pasaichthys =

Pasaichthys Temporal range: Lutetian

Extinct genus of fishes

Pasaichthys pleuronectiformis is an extinct, prehistoric moonyfish that lived during the Lutetian epoch of Monte Bolca, Italy. The average length of its fossils is about 6 centimeters. In life, it would probably resemble its living relatives of the genus Monodactylus.

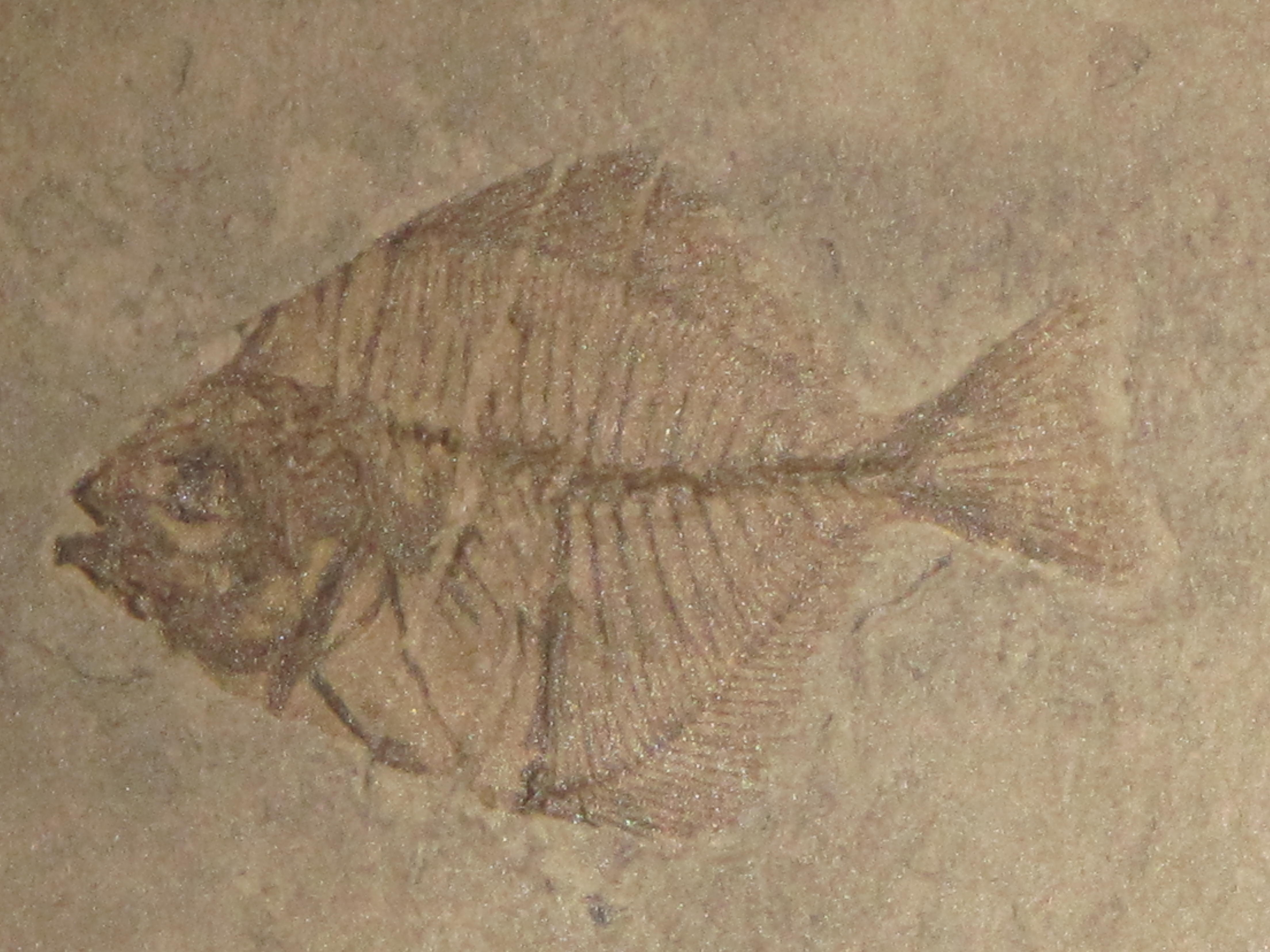
Mockup of a fossil

== See also ==
- Prehistoric fish
- List of prehistoric bony fish
