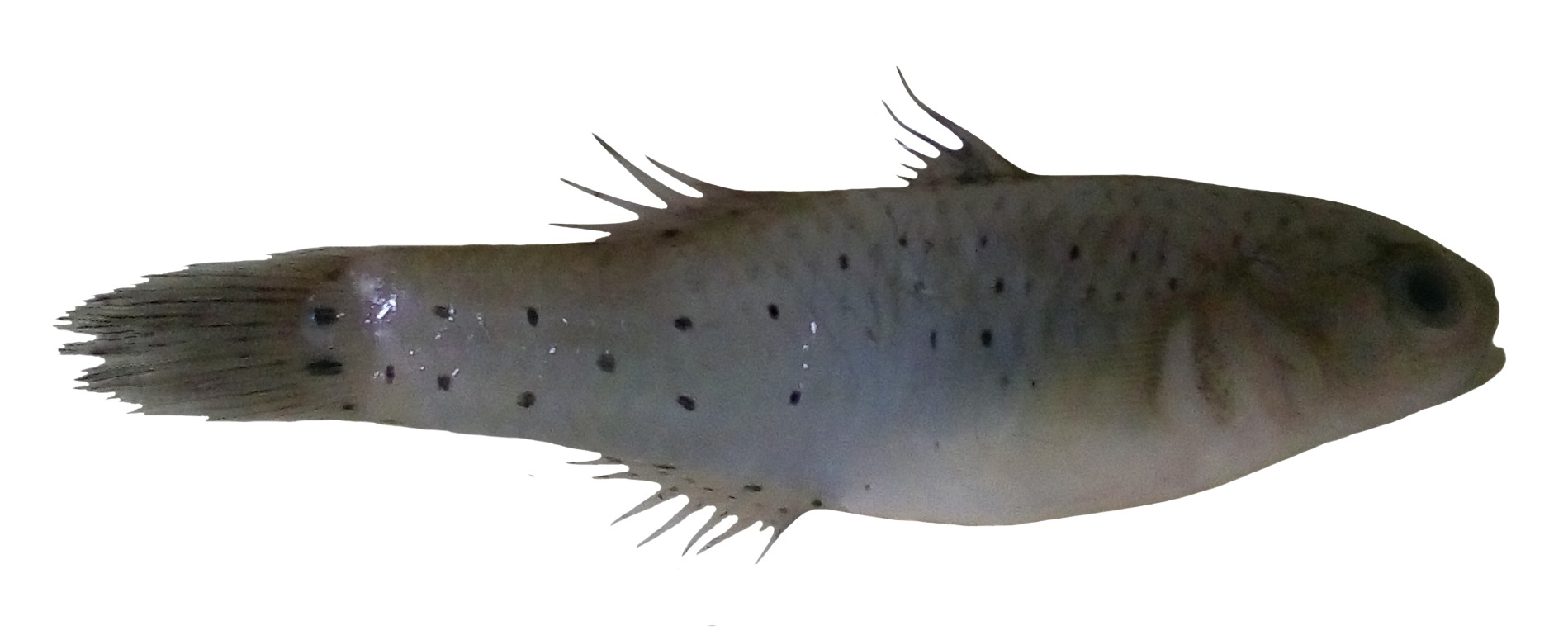

Scientific classification
- Kingdom: Animalia
- Phylum: Chordata
- Class: Actinopterygii
- Order: Gobiiformes
- Family: Oxudercidae
- Genus: Stigmatogobius
- Species: S. pleurostigma

Binomial name
- Stigmatogobius pleurostigma (Bleeker, 1849)

Synonyms
- Gobius pleurostigma Bleeker, 1849; Vaimosa spilopleura H.M. Smith, 1933

= Stigmatogobius pleurostigma =

Species of fish

Stigmatogobius pleurostigma is a species of goby from the subfamily Gobionellinae that lives freshwater to brackish water in Southeast Asia.
