= Brachygobius mekongensis =

Conservation status
- Least Concern (IUCN 3.1)

Scientific classification
- Kingdom: Animalia
- Phylum: Chordata
- Class: Actinopterygii
- Order: Gobiiformes
- Family: Oxudercidae
- Genus: Brachygobius
- Species: B. mekongensis

Binomial name
- Brachygobius mekongensis Larson & Vidthayanon, 2000

Species of goby fish

Brachygobius mekongensis is a species of goby from the subfamily Gobionellinae which is found in the Mekong basin in southern Vietnam, Thailand, Cambodia (including Tonle Sap) and Laos where it lives in slow flowing waters and swamps among tangled roots and vegetation. This species is infrequently recorded in the aquarium trade and is potentially threatened by degradation of its habitat by drainage, water diversion and the building of dams and bridges.
