= Brachygobius sabanus =

Conservation status
- Least Concern (IUCN 3.1)

Scientific classification
- Kingdom: Animalia
- Phylum: Chordata
- Class: Actinopterygii
- Order: Gobiiformes
- Family: Oxudercidae
- Genus: Brachygobius
- Species: B. sabanus

Binomial name
- Brachygobius sabanus Inger, 1958

Species of fish

Brachygobius sabanus is one of 8 species of goby in the Brachygobius genus, which all share the common name of bumblebee fish or bumblebee goby due to their characteristic black and yellow stripes. Over the past two centuries, efforts to distinguish different species within the Brachygobius genus have occurred within scientific literature; Brachygobius sabanus was described within literature as its own species in 1958, by Robert F. Inger. Other gobies within the genus are B. nunus, B. doriae, B. alcocki, B. sua, B. xanthomelas, B. aggregatus, and B. kabiliensis.

== Taxonomy ==
Brachygobius sabanus belongs to the class Actinopterygii, known as the ray-finned fishes, which encompasses a vast number of fish species and represents half of all living vertebrates on Earth. B. sabanus is part of the order of Gobiiformes, and are further categorized into the genus Brachygobius and species sabanus.

== Description ==
Brachygobius sabanus has a very similar appearance to the other goby species in the Brachygobius genus, which all have relatively small bodies and distinctive black and yellow stripes. Fish in this genus, including B. sabanus, are more cylindrical towards the anterior end of the body, and more compressed towards the posterior end. The head is flattened between the eyes, and the cranial roof sits beneath the dorsal axial muscle. They have two nostrils near the front of their head, and an additional two pore-like nostrils posterior to the first set, close to the eye. As for their dentition, they have caniniform teeth in both their oral jaw and in their pharyngeal jaw.

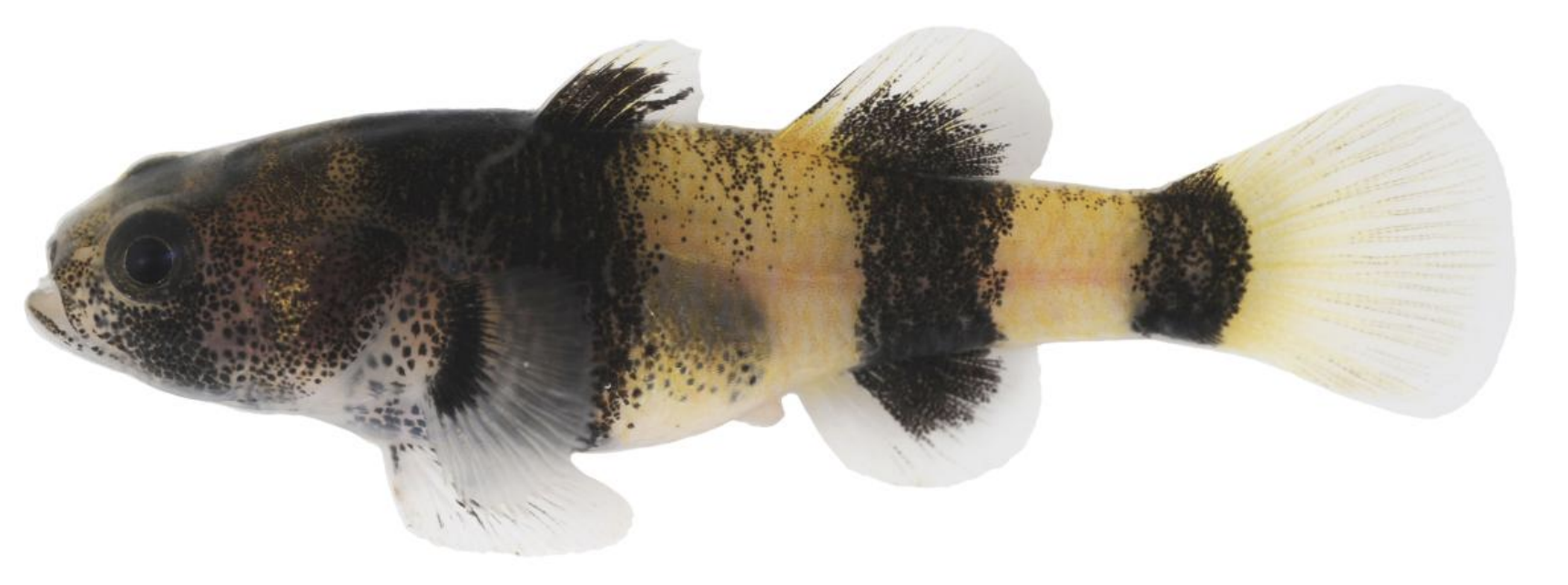
Photo of Brachygobius sabanus by H. H. Tan; specimen found in the Kranji Marshes and measures 21.4 mm SL

Brachygobius sabanus, in particular, has a yellow body with three black stripes and a black head. The first stripe overlaps with the black head and ends at the anterior half of the first dorsal fin; the last stripe spans down to the mid-ventral line posterior to the base of the anal fin; one additional black stripe sits between these. The first dorsal fin has black coloration at the anterior basal portion. Less than half of the pectoral fins, as well as the pelvic fins, are black. Finally, there is a thin yellow bar along the nape. B. sabanus has large ctenoid scales; there are between 24 and 27 mid-lateral scales and between 0 and 2 predorsal scales on the body, but no scales on the head. It has two dorsal fins, a rounded caudal fin that is no bigger than its head, and, like other gobies in the Brachygobius genus, its pelvic fins are fused together, creating a ventral disc. It can use this disc to attach itself to surfaces vertically and upside-down.

B. sabanus shares the most similar appearance to Brachygobius doriae. Differences between the two species can be found by observing the number of dorsal and anal rays, as well as mid-lateral scales; B. sabanus has more dorsal and anal rays than B. doriae, but fewer mid-lateral scales. These two fish can also be differentiated by their coloration; B. sabanus has small black dots within the light dorsal coloration, known as dark dorsal saddles, which B. doriae does not possess. B. sabanus also shares very similar patterns of lateral-line sensory papillae with other Brachygobius species.

== Distribution ==
Brachygobius sabanus originated in, and is distributed across, Southeast Asia with well-established populations. However, it is not native to Singapore, where many introduced B. sabanus populations have been found. Within Singapore, this goby has been located in the Poyan, Tengah, Kranji, and Upper Seletar Reservoirs, the Kranji Marshes, the Sungei Buloh Wetland Reserve, Banir (specifically, the Lorong Banir Stream in Seletar), and Sungei Seletar. It is commonly found in freshwater ecosystems, including intertidal rock pools or waters with aquatic grasses, where it can hide from predators.

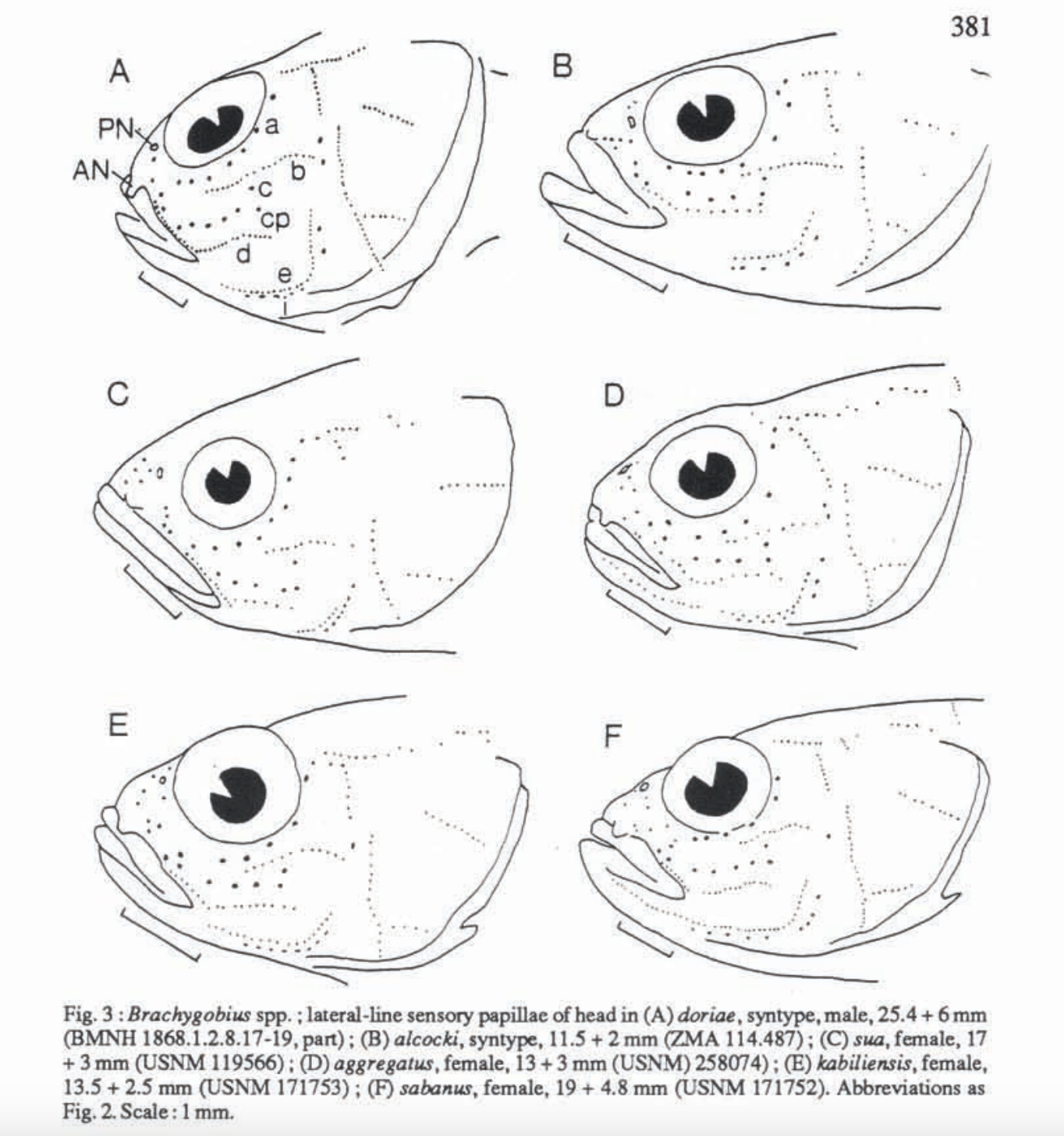
Illustrated diagram of lateral-line sensory papillae on the head of 6 Brachygobius species: (A) doriae, (B) alcocki, (C) sua, (D) aggregatus, (E) kabiliensis, (F) sabanus.

== Biology ==
Brachygobius sabanus can grow to be up to 26.5 mm (1.04 in) (from the anterior end of the snout to the base of the caudal fin) or 33 mm (1.3 in) (from the anterior end of the snout to the posterior end of the caudal fin). As for their swimming behavior, B. sabanus spends a substantial amount of time "perching" and/or "hopping" between spots. It has been known to exhibit benthic behavior, but is not solely benthic. It has also been observed to swim for extended periods of time, using its swim bladder to aid in buoyancy. Additionally, Brachygobius sabanus is one of two goby species (out of eight that have been tested) that show a response to the chemical stimuli which are released when a conspecific is injured. Upon detecting the stimuli, it will reduce movements such as feeding and foraging behaviors, in order to be less noticeable to predators. Contrarily, when B. sabanus is exposed to chemical stimuli from a distantly related fish that has been injured, it increases feeding and foraging activity; this could mean that B. sabanus is good at detecting and ignoring false alarms. Extract from the skin of B. sabanus has also been used as a control in multiple studies to test these chemical stimuli abilities in other fishes.

== Conservation status ==
Brachygobius sabanus was listed as Least Concern in the IUCN Red List in 2018. It is reported to have well-established populations across Southeast Asia where it originated, as well as in Singapore where it is non-native. There are also many populations of B. sabanus circulating in the aquarium trade, as it is a popular ornamental fish. This aspect of human use may be the reason this species was introduced into Singapore habitats, as there are many facilities for farming, importing, and exporting ornamental fish around the Sungei Buloh Wetland Reserve and the Kranji Reservoir.
