= Brachygobius nunus =

Scientific classification
- Kingdom: Animalia
- Phylum: Chordata
- Class: Actinopterygii
- Order: Gobiiformes
- Family: Oxudercidae
- Genus: Brachygobius
- Species: B. nunus

Binomial name
- Brachygobius nunus (F. Hamilton, 1822)

Synonyms
- Gobius nunus F. Hamilton, 1822; Gobius alcockii Annandale, 1906; Gobius bombayensis Annandale, 1919

Species of fish

Brachygobius nunus, the Golden banded goby, is a species of bumblebee goby, a small genus of gobies that takes its common name from their round bodies, big heads, and their overall yellow to golden coloration interrupted by four brown to black vertical stripes reminiscent of the striped pattern of a bumblebee. They have also been figuratively described as "buzzing" from one surface to another inside the aquarium. Like other members of its genus, it is popular as an aquarium fish.

== Description ==
B. nunus can reach a length of 2.5 centimetres (0.98 in) SL. As in all true Gobiidae, the ventral fins of Brachygobius nunus have fused into a suction cup that they use to attach to surfaces in nature and even to glass inside an aquarium. This particular species can be identified by the one spine and seven rays that characterize its anal fin.

== Range ==
As with other Bumblebee gobies, B. nunus is native to Asia. Its natural habitat is saltwater swamps and stream estuaries in Borneo, India, Indonesia, Malaysia, Myanmar, Singapore, and Thailand.

== Captivity ==
While B. nunus can often survive in a freshwater aquarium, brackish conditions (with at least two teaspoons of sea salt mix per gallon of water) are recommended. Live or frozen brine shrimp, daphnia and whiteworms are optimal foods. While they might take flake food if hungry enough, a diet of dried prepared foods only is not recommended.

Breeding this species in captivity is facilitated by housing them in a relatively small enclosure well-decorated with little "caves" such as snail shells in which they can breed. One source says that placing a dozen juveniles B. nunus together in a 10-US-gallon (38 L) aquarium is a good way of successfully matching pairs for breeding. This same sources recommends large and frequent water changes, an increase in salinity ( from 2 tsp/gallon up to 1 tbsp/gallon), and "spoil(ing) them with live food" rather than frozen food as effective means to coax captive B. nunus into breeding.

Newly emerged B. nunus fry are tiny and should be isolated from adults so they are not cannibalized. A five gallon tank is big enough for them. The fry are very sensitive to water quality and changes in temperature or salinity so it is recommended to fill their new tank with water from their original tank and then maintain the water quality rigorously. Newly fry can be fed vinegar eels or commercially-prepared liquid fry food but are big enough to devour newly hatched brine shrimp within a few days.
