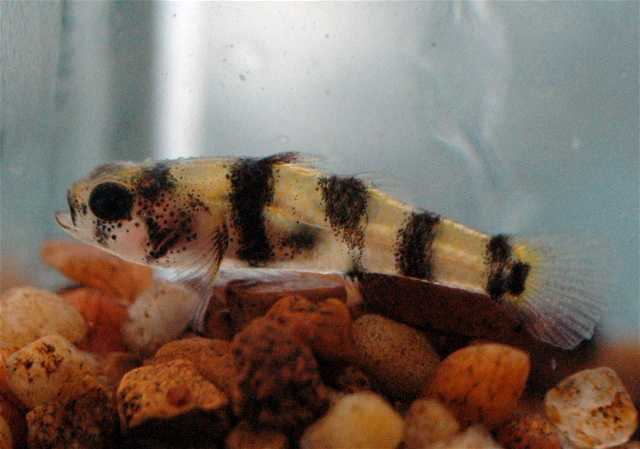

Conservation status
- Data Deficient (IUCN 3.1)

Scientific classification
- Kingdom: Animalia
- Phylum: Chordata
- Class: Actinopterygii
- Order: Gobiiformes
- Family: Oxudercidae
- Genus: Brachygobius
- Species: B. xanthomelas

Binomial name
- Brachygobius xanthomelas Herre, 1937

= Brachygobius xanthomelas =

Species of goby fish

Brachygobius xanthomelas is a species of goby from the subfamily Gobionellinae which occurs in Peninsular Malaysia, Singapore and on the island of Borneo. It is a little known species which occurs in the aquarium trade.
