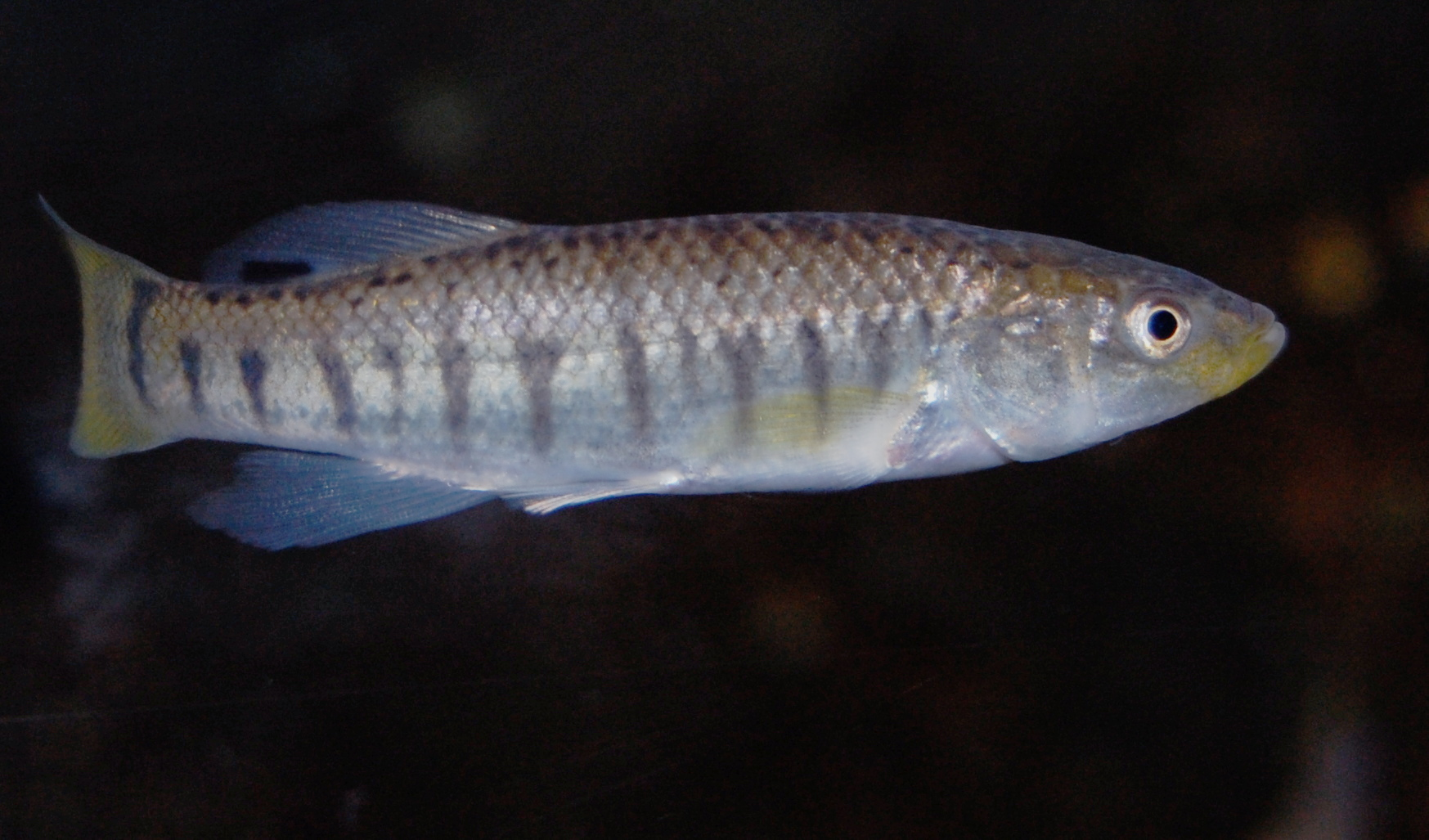

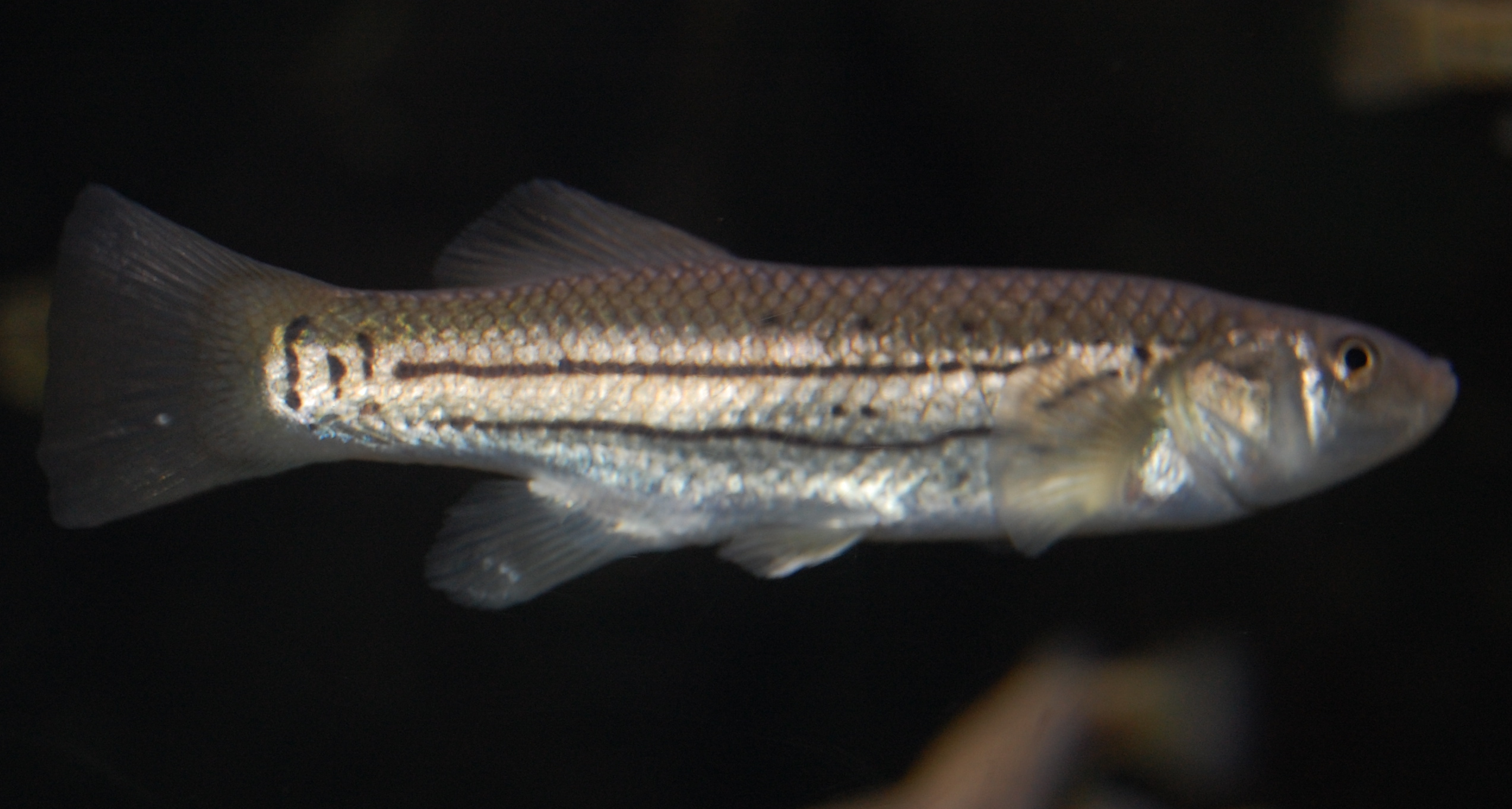
- Male above, female below. At the New England Aquarium

Conservation status
- Least Concern (IUCN 3.1)

Scientific classification
- Kingdom: Animalia
- Phylum: Chordata
- Class: Actinopterygii
- Division: Teleostei
- Order: Cyprinodontiformes
- Family: Fundulidae
- Genus: Fundulus
- Species: F. majalis

Binomial name
- Fundulus majalis (Walbaum, 1792)

Synonyms
- Cobitis majalis Walbaum, 1792; Esox flavula Mitchill, 1814; Fundulus flavulus (Mitchill, 1814); Esox zonatus Mitchill, 1815; Fundulus zonatus (Mitchill, 1815); Hydrargyra trifasciata Storer, 1837; Fundulus trifasciatus (Storer, 1837); Hydrargira formosa Storer, 1842; Fundulus formosus (Storer, 1842); Hydrargyra vernalis Valenciennes, 1846; Fundulus vernalis (Valenciennes, 1846)

= Striped killifish =

Species of fish

The striped killifish (Fundulus majalis), also called the striped mummichog, is a North American species of fundulid killifish. It lives in salt and brackish waters in shallow coastal regions from New Hampshire to Florida, and in the northern Gulf of Mexico.

It exhibits sexual dimorphism, with the males having vertical black stripes and the mature females having horizontal black stripes along the sides of their silver-colored bodies. Juvenile females have vertical stripes, however, and one or two vertical stripes remain at the end of the tail even on adult females. Striped killifish typically reach lengths of up to 6 in (15 cm), occasionally 7 in (18 cm).

== Tidepool survival techniques ==
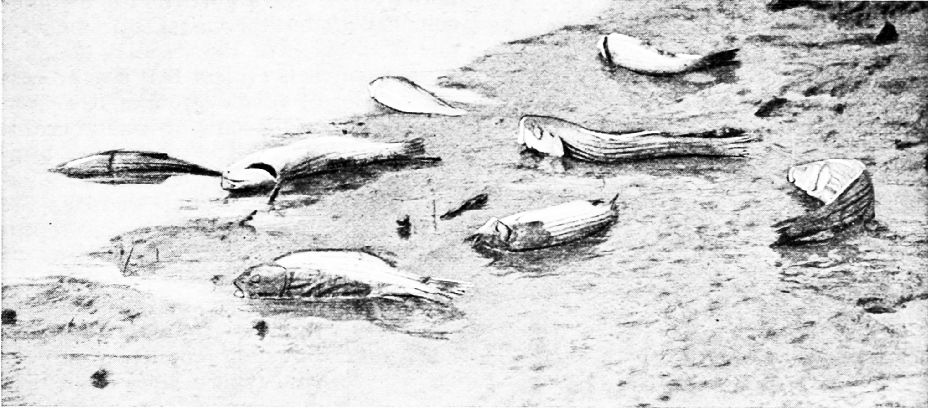
Several striped killifish on land

In Feb 1916, Popular Science Monthly had a news article on research being done by Professor S. O. Mast of the zoological department of Johns Hopkins University. The professor was studying the Fundulus majolisis and noted their ability to survive the draining of ocean tide pools. These fish would swim in and out of the tide pools on regular intervals, somehow knowing when to swim out before the tidewaters drained from the pools. If for some reason the outlet of the pool were to close off as the tide went out, the fish would quickly swim around the tide pool randomly looking for an alternate escape route.

If the fish cannot find an exit, they actually leave the water and flop over land to reach the ocean. Professor Mast saw scores and scores of these fish leave large tide pools and travel across sand bars up to 12 feet wide and six inches tall. The fish nearly always leave the pool on the side towards the ocean, and are able to travel straight towards the ocean rather than flopping around randomly. At the time it was not known how the fish are able to find the ocean so readily.

After about three minutes of becoming trapped in a rapidly disappearing tide pool, a dense aggregation of fish form on the side of the pool towards the ocean, and swim up and down the side of the pool. Then, in groups of about twelve, the fish leave the pool and head across land towards the sea.
