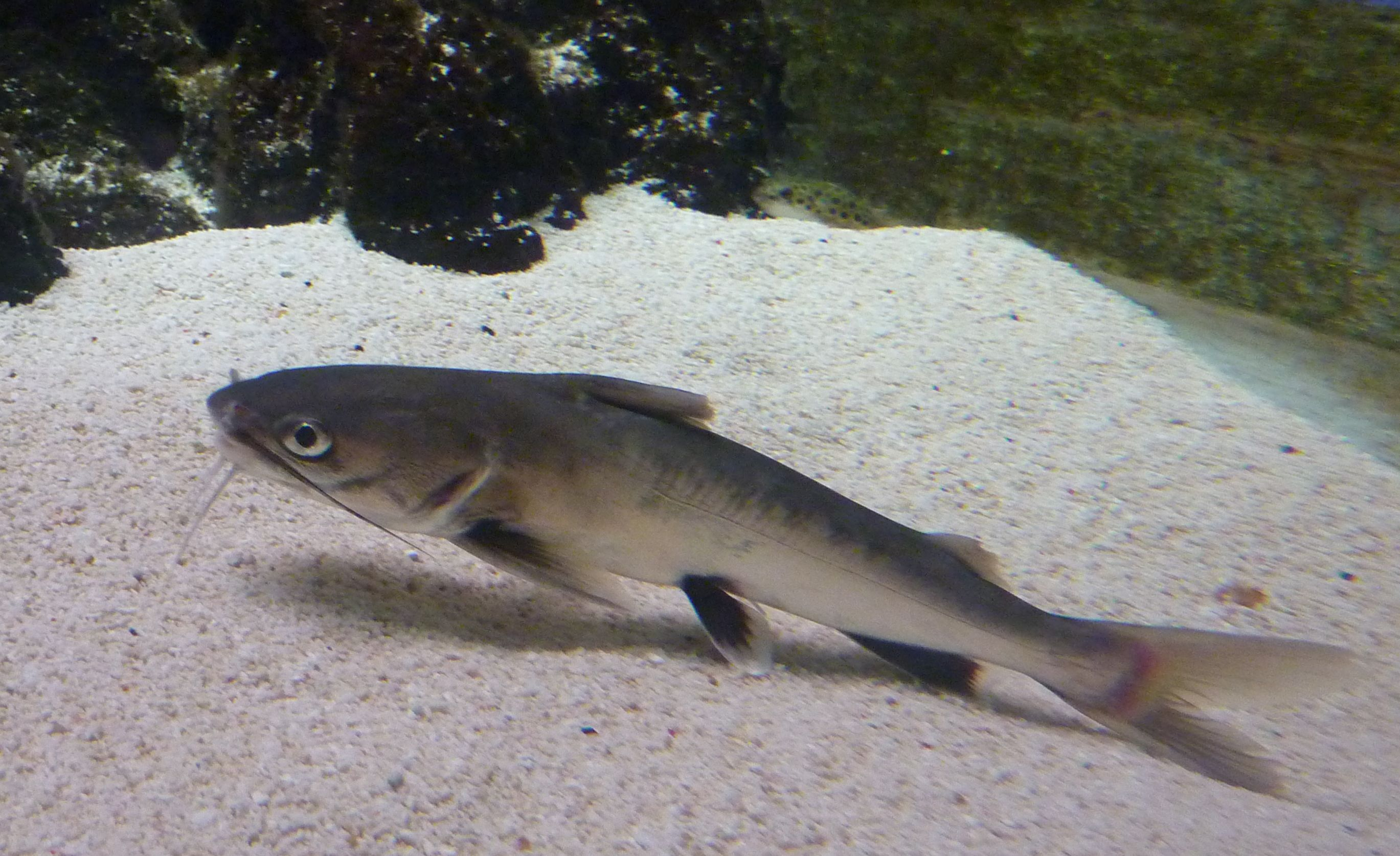

Conservation status
- Least Concern (IUCN 3.1)

Scientific classification
- Kingdom: Animalia
- Phylum: Chordata
- Class: Actinopterygii
- Order: Siluriformes
- Family: Ariidae
- Genus: Ariopsis
- Species: A. seemanni

Binomial name
- Ariopsis seemanni (Günther, 1864)

Synonyms
- Arius seemanni Günther, 1864; Galeichthys gilberti Jordan & Williams, 1895; Galeichthys eigenmanni Gilbert & Starks, 1904; Galeichthys simonsi Starks, 1906; Sciades seemanni (Günther, 1864); Tachisurus jordani Eigenmann & Eigenmann, 1888

= Tete sea catfish =

Species of fish

The Tete sea catfish (Ariopsis seemanni) or Colombian shark catfish is a species of sea catfish in the family Ariidae, native to Pacific-draining rivers and estuaries in Central and South America.

== In the aquarium ==
Tete sea catfishes are occasionally available in the pet trade under a variety of names, including Colombian (or Columbian) shark, silver tipped shark, white tip shark catfish, black fin shark, Christian catfish, Jordan's catfish, and West American cat shark. However, they are not appropriate for most aquarists because they must be acclimated from freshwater to saltwater as they mature. It requires a very large tank due to its size and active swimming habits.
