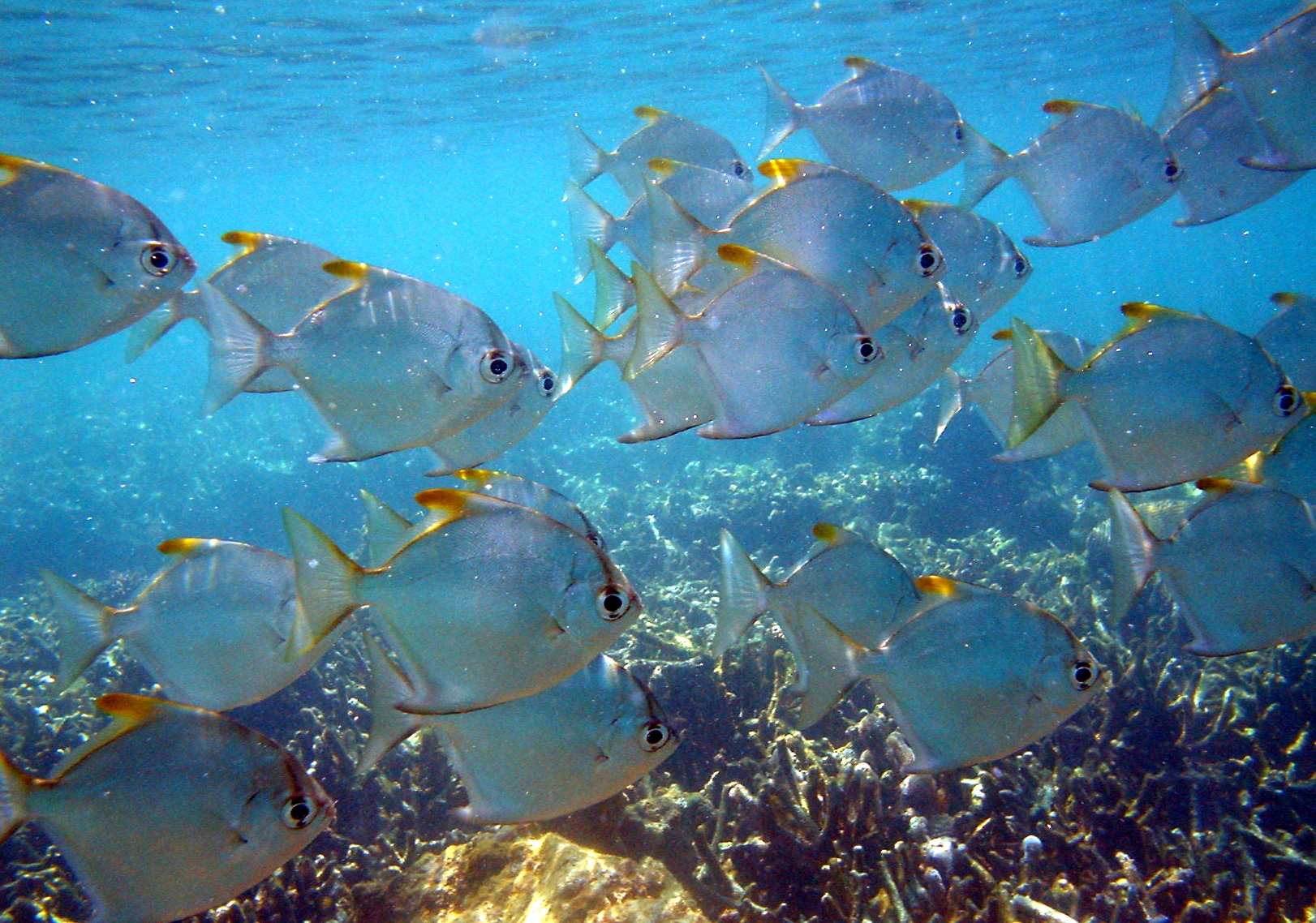
- Silver Moony (M. argenteus)
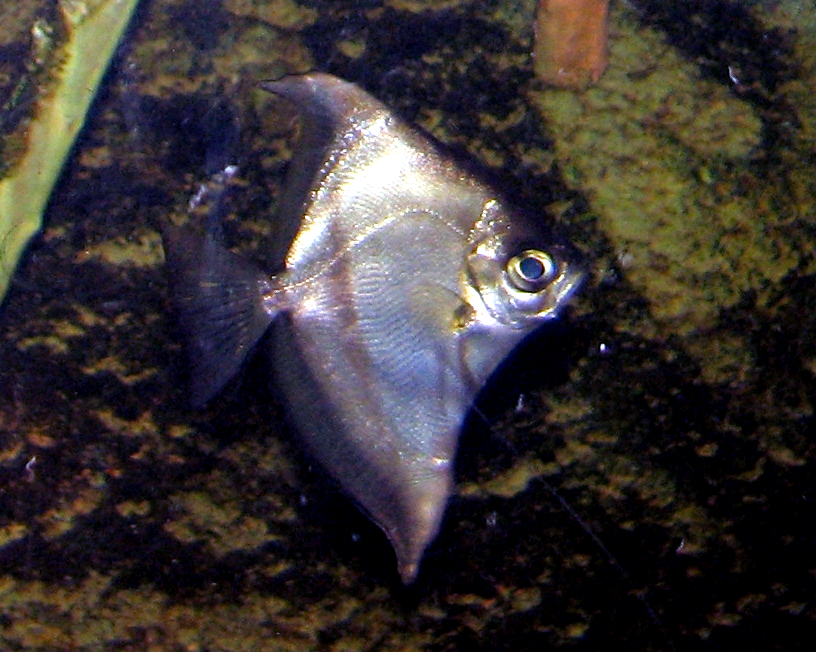
- African Moony (M. sebae)

Scientific classification
- Domain: Eukaryota
- Kingdom: Animalia
- Phylum: Chordata
- Class: Actinopterygii
- Order: Acanthuriformes
- Family: Monodactylidae
- Genus: Monodactylus; Lacépède, 1801

Type species
- Monodactylus falciformis Lacépède, 1801

Synonyms
- Centropodus Lacépède, 1801; Psettus Commerson, 1801 (not available); Acanthopodus Lacépède, 1802; Psettus G. Cuvier, 1829; Stromatoidea Castelnau, 1861; Psettias D. S. Jordan, 1906

= Monodactylus =

Genus of ray-finned fishes

Monodactylus is a genus of moonyfishes found in fresh, brackish and marine waters from the eastern Atlantic, through the Indian to the western Pacific oceans.

== Species ==
There are currently four recognized species in this genus:

- Monodactylus argenteus (Linnaeus, 1758) (Silver moony)
- Monodactylus falciformis Lacépède, 1801 (Full moony)
- Monodactylus kottelati Pethiyagoda, 1991 (Dwarf moony)
- Monodactylus sebae (G. Cuvier, 1829) (African moony)
