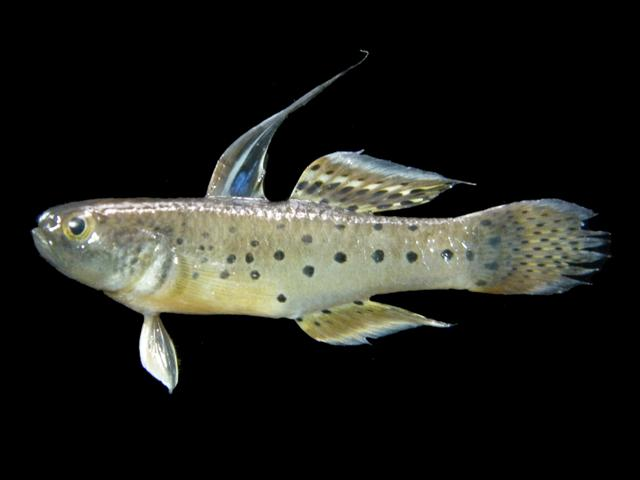

Scientific classification
- Kingdom: Animalia
- Phylum: Chordata
- Class: Actinopterygii
- Division: Teleostei
- Order: Gobiiformes
- Family: Oxudercidae
- Genus: Stigmatogobius
- Species: S. sadanundio

Binomial name
- Stigmatogobius sadanundio (F. Hamilton, 1822)

Synonyms
- Gobius sadanundio F. Hamilton, 1822; Gobius apogonius Cantor, 1849

= Stigmatogobius sadanundio =

Species of goby indigenous to South Asia

Stigmatogobius sadanundio is a species of goby native to south Asia from India to Indonesia including Sri Lanka and the Andaman Islands. It can be found in mostly fresh waters (occasionally in brackish waters) of estuaries and the tidal zones of rivers. It can also be found in the aquarium trade, where it is often marketed as the knight goby.

== Description ==
There are two dorsal fins on this gray-blue fish: the first consists of about six stiffly held rays (often with a black blotch); the second is equal in length to the long-based anal fin. Both carry dark spots. This species can reach a length of 9 centimetres (3.5 in) SL.

== Aquarium care ==
The knight goby should be kept singly with other mid-level species. When placed in an aquarium with fish of the same species quarrels may arise as this is a very territorial fish. It does best in low light, as bright light makes it skittish. It needs plenty of rocks, caves, and natural territorial boundaries. Good tankmates are swordtails and sailfin mollies.

=== Distinguishing between sexes ===
Females lack the longer fins and are yellowish in color.

=== Diet, and feeding behaviour ===
The knight goby prefers live food, but will take most commercially available formulations

=== Temperature, pH, and salinity ===
The knight goby benefits from a fluctuation in temperature over a 24-hour period, with a lower temperature at night. They will tolerate temperatures between 20 and 26 °C (68 and 79 °F). It is not essential, but the fish will do better with 1–2 level teaspoons of salt per 11 litres (2.5 gallons).

=== Breeding ===
If you wish to breed them, a species tank is best. The water temperature should be raised to about 24–28 °C (75–82 °F), and the addition of salt helps induce spawning/ A sand substrate is required. The gobies lay their eggs on the ceilings of caves, so an inverted pot makes a good substitute. A pair may produce 1000 or so eggs each of which is attached to the cave ceiling by a fine thread. Both parents tend the brood and the fry are relatively easily reared on newly hatched brine shrimp.
