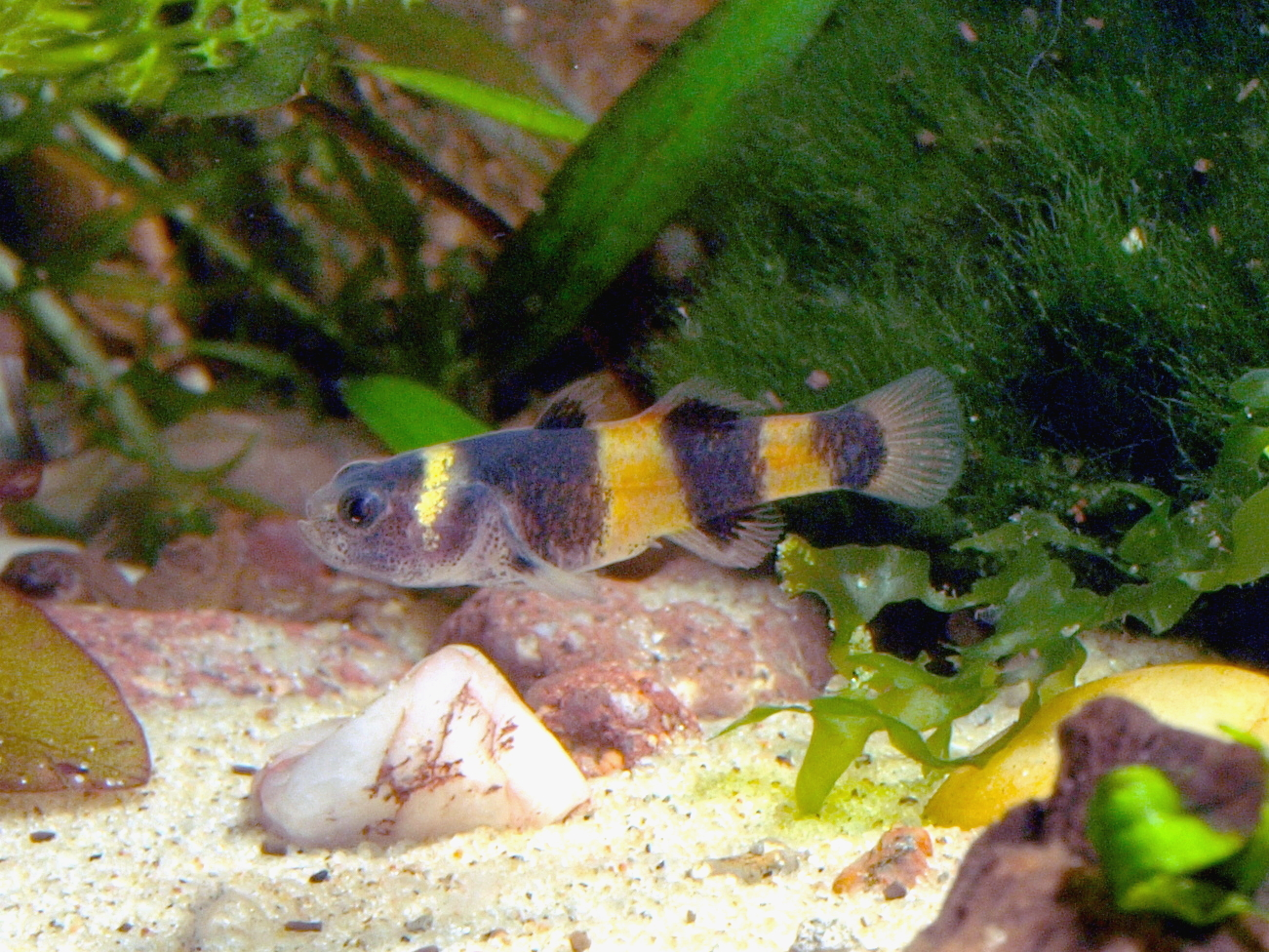

Conservation status
- Data Deficient (IUCN 3.1)

Scientific classification
- Kingdom: Animalia
- Phylum: Chordata
- Class: Actinopterygii
- Order: Gobiiformes
- Family: Oxudercidae
- Genus: Brachygobius
- Species: B. xanthozonus

Binomial name
- Brachygobius xanthozonus (Bleeker, 1849)

Synonyms
- Gobius xanthozona Bleeker, 1849; Brachygobius xanthozona (Bleeker, 1849); Hypogymnogobius xanthozona (Bleeker, 1849); Hypogymnogobius xanthozonus (Bleeker, 1849)

= Bumblebee fish =

Species of fish

The bumblebee fish (Brachygobius xanthozonus) is a species of fresh and brackish water goby native to Thailand and Indonesia. This species can reach a length of 3.8 centimetres (1.5 in) SL and is found in lower parts of rivers, coastal areas, mangroves and highly vegetated areas.

== Taxonomy ==
Brachygobius xanthozona is distinct from many of the other species in the genus Brachygobius and has been placed by some ichthyologists in the genus Hypogymnogobius. It is very rare in the wild, yet has been imported as an aquarium fish
