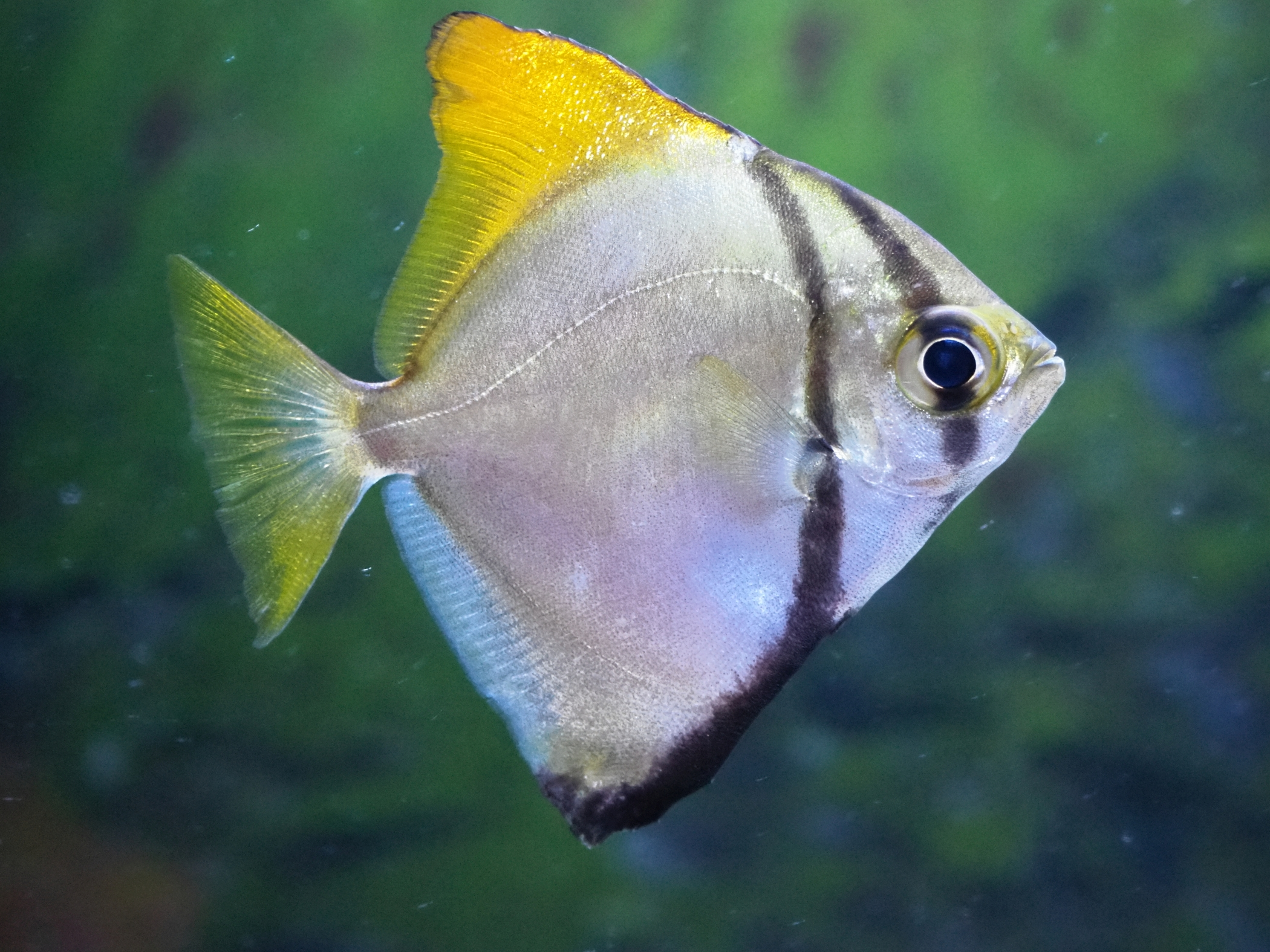
- A juvenile

Conservation status
- Least Concern (IUCN 3.1)

Scientific classification
- Kingdom: Animalia
- Phylum: Chordata
- Class: Actinopterygii
- Division: Teleostei
- Order: Acanthuriformes
- Family: Monodactylidae
- Genus: Monodactylus
- Species: M. argenteus

Binomial name
- Monodactylus argenteus (Linnaeus, 1758)

Synonyms
- Chaetodon argenteus Linnaeus, 1758; Psettus argenteus (Linnaeus, 1758); Scomber rhombeus Forsskål, 1775; Psettus rhombeus (Forsskål, 1775)

= Monodactylus argenteus =

Species of fish

Monodactylus argenteus is a species of ray-finned fish in the family Monodactylidae, the moonyfishes. Its common name includes silver moonyfish, natal moony, butter bream, and diamondfish. It is native to the western Pacific and the Indian Ocean, including the Persian Gulf, Red Sea, and associated estuaries such as the Mekong Delta.

== Etymology ==
The specific epithet of this species, argenteus, is Latin for "silvery". This may be a reference to its silvery hue.

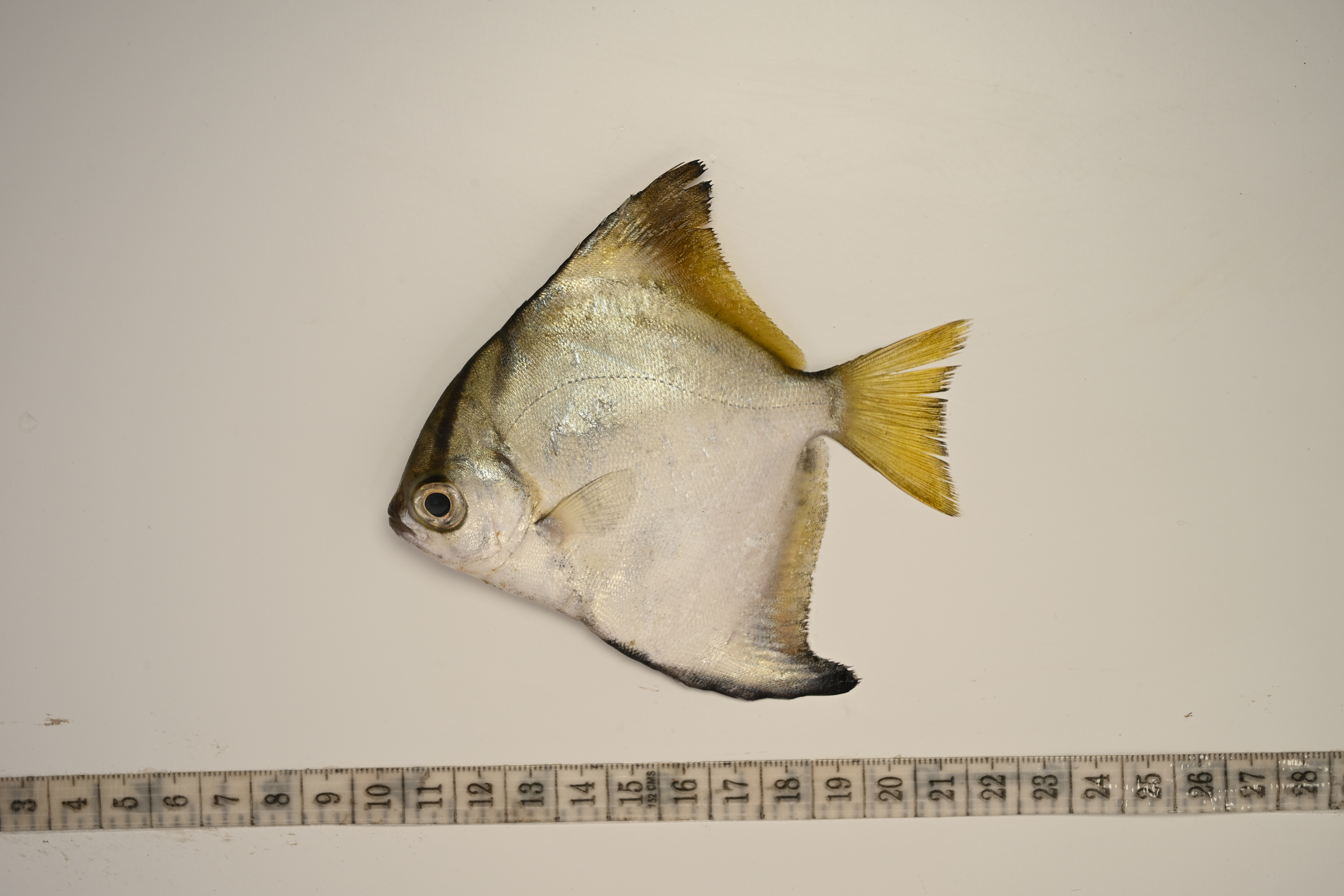
Monodactylus argenteus

== Description ==
This species reaches a maximum length of about 27 cm. It is of a bright shiny silver color with yellowish edges to the fins, and the dorsal and anal fins have black tips. Juveniles have more yellow coloration and have two vertical black bands, one across the eye and the other just behind the operculum.

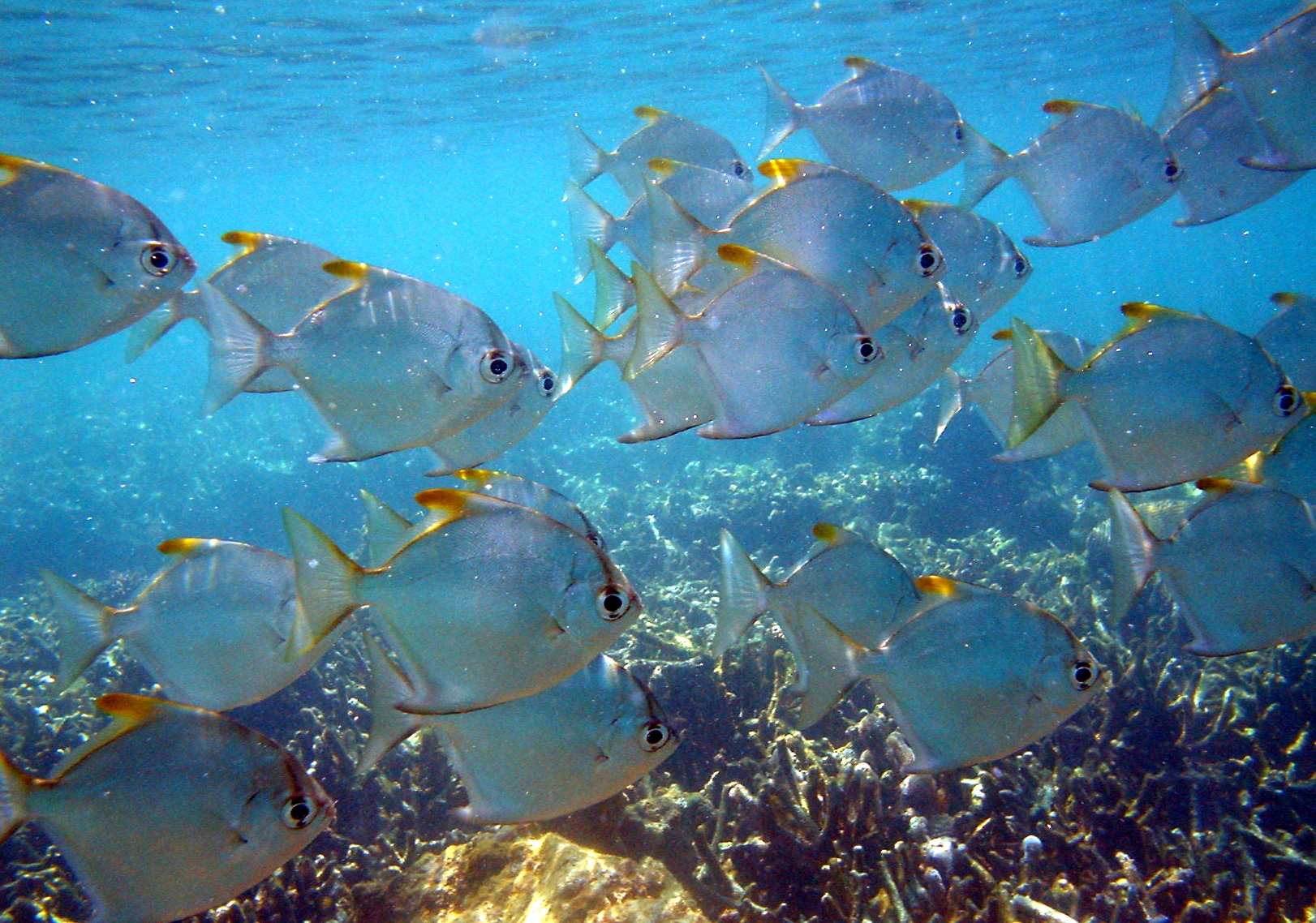
A school of silver moony fish swimming above corals off the coast of Madagascar.

== Habitat ==
This species occurs in a wide variety of habitat types, including the open ocean, brackish waters, and the freshwater habitat of rivers (for instance, in Australia, it can be found in harbors and estuaries around piers). Its ability to survive in a wide range of salinities makes it a model organism in the study of salinity tolerance. Juveniles are especially tolerant to salinity changes, easily maintaining homeostasis in variable environments such as estuaries.

== Behavior ==
Although this species displays territorial behavior, it can be kept in saltwater aquaria and is easy to rear in captivity. It can remain solitary or form schools. It is a detritivore and planktivore.

== Parasites ==
The myxozoan parasite Kudoa monodactyli is found on and named after this fish.
