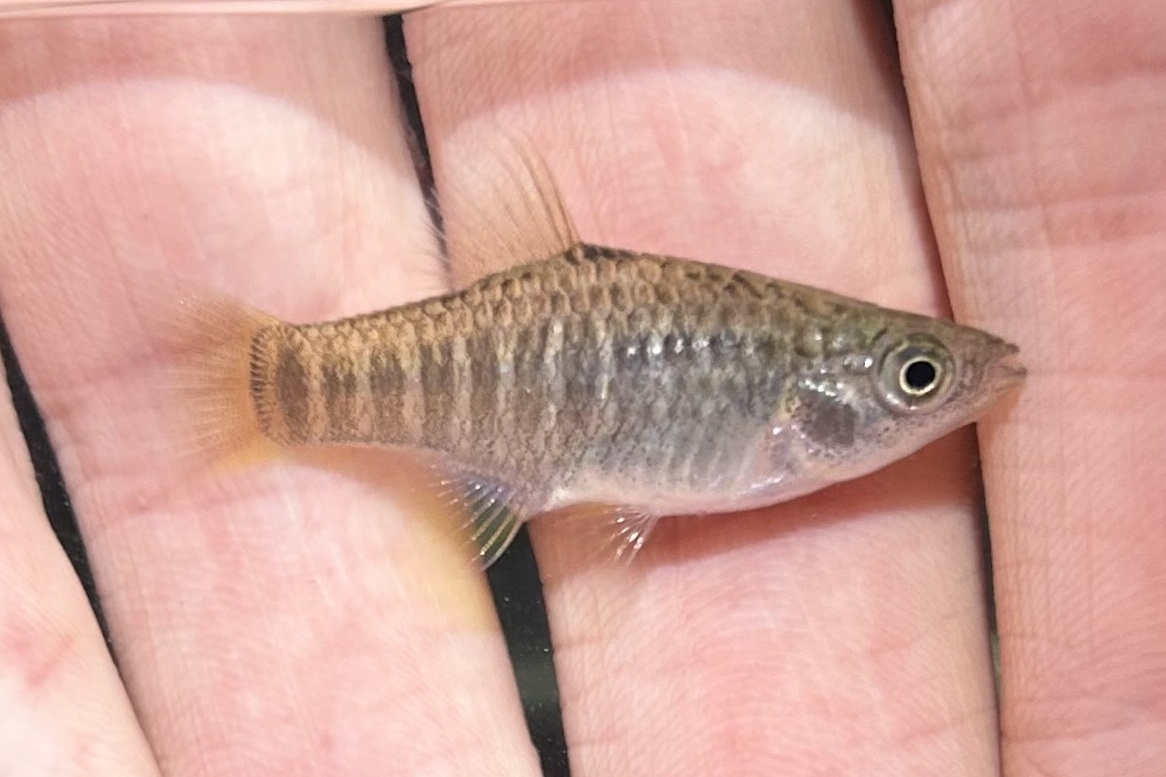

Scientific classification
- Kingdom: Animalia
- Phylum: Chordata
- Class: Actinopterygii
- Order: Cyprinodontiformes
- Family: Fundulidae
- Genus: Fundulus
- Species: F. xenicus

Binomial name
- Fundulus xenicus D. S. Jordan & C. H. Gilbert, 1882

Synonyms
- Adinia xenica (Jordan & Gilbert, 1882)

= Diamond killifish =

Species of fish

The diamond killifish (Fundulus xenicus) is a species of North American killifish found in salt marshes, hypersaline flats and mangrove along the Gulf Coast of the United States. This species grows to a length of 6 cm (2.4 in). It is found in the aquarium trade. It was previously recognized as, Adinia xenica, the only known member of the genus Adinia. Nucleotide analyses has reevaluated the phylogeny of the Funduliidae and placed the diamond killifish into the Fundulus genus.
