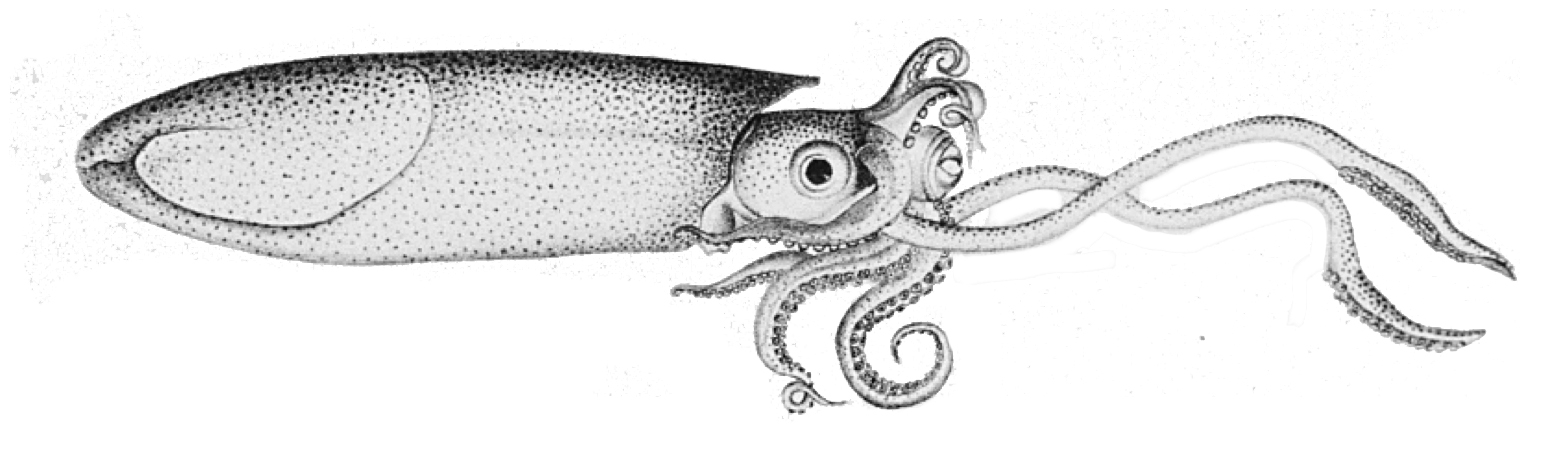
- Lolliguncula brevis

Conservation status
- Data Deficient (IUCN 3.1)

- Secure (NatureServe)

Scientific classification
- Kingdom: Animalia
- Phylum: Mollusca
- Class: Cephalopoda
- Order: Myopsida
- Family: Loliginidae
- Genus: Lolliguncula
- Species: L. brevis

Binomial name
- Lolliguncula brevis (Blainville, 1823)

Synonyms
- Loligo brevipinna Lesueur, 1824; Loligo brevis Blainville, 1823; Loligo hemiptera Howell, 1867

= Lolliguncula brevis =

Species of squid

Lolliguncula brevis, or the Atlantic brief squid, is a small species of squid in the Loliginidae family. They are found in shallow parts of the western Atlantic Ocean, through Rio de la Plata, Argentina, as far as the Bay of Fundy. The average female Atlantic brief squid is 11 cm long and the average male is 9 cm. The maximum mantle length ever recorded was 12 cm.

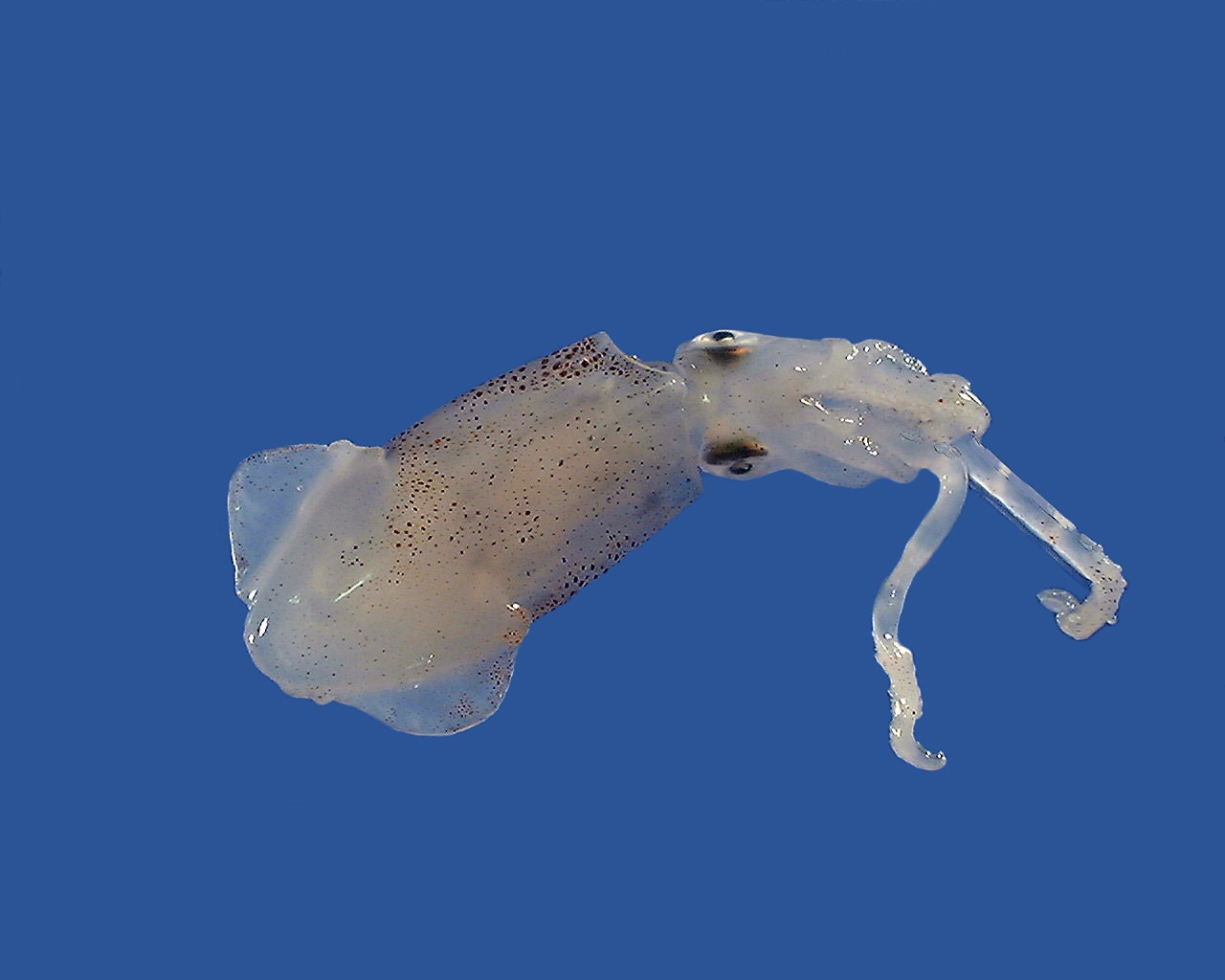
Lolliguncula brevis

== Biology ==
The mantle is widest in the middle and tapers to a rounded point at the back. It has thick muscular walls and a large water-filled cavity and is separated from the head by a collar. The head has two large eyes, the structure of which is very similar to vertebrate eyes. There is a funnel (siphon) underneath the head which is used in locomotion. The fins are wider than they are long, rounded and about half the length of the mantle. There are five pairs of appendages. Numbers 1, 2, 3 and 5 are short tapering arms with two rows of suckers. The left 5th appendage of males is modified to form a hectocotylus arm. The other pair of appendages are contractile tentacles and are much longer than the arms. These have clubs with four rows of suckers at the distal end, and are used for capturing food which is then transferred to the arms.

The basic color is dark reddish-brown to yellow-brown. The upper surface is covered in chromatophores, which allow the squid to change colors. In order to move, water inside the mantle cavity is expelled through the funnel (siphon) by muscular contraction of the mantle walls. To catch fast-moving prey, the contraction is vigorous, directing a jet of water backwards through the funnel. To escape a predator, the funnel is directed forward, and the squid shoots water backwards at great speeds. The siphon can also emit a cloud of ink, a melanin-rich mixture which is stored in an ink sac near their gut. The expulsion of this ink is used to distract and daze predators. The Atlantic Brief Squid is common in the nektonic community and assumed to be important prey for carnivorous fishes, as well as adult squid, which will occasionally exhibit cannibalistic tendencies toward juveniles. Feeding habits change as they mature. Small squid feed on benthic crustaceans, small fish or fry, and large squid feed on schooling species of fish, such as Bay Anchovies and Silversides. When in captivity, they can survive well on grass shrimp and small fishes such as killifish, livebearers, and Sheepshead Minnow.

=== Reproduction ===
The hectocotylus arm is used to transfer spermatophores into the female reproductive organ. The posterior end of the female's mantle is occupied by a pair of white nidamental glands, which secrete the material from which the egg capsule is formed. Eggs are deposited in a gelatinous capsule and attached to the sea bed. The large-yolked eggs hatch into fully formed miniature versions of the parent squid.

== Distribution and Habitat ==
The Atlantic brief squid occurs most frequently in shallow waters along the eastern seaboard of the United States as far north as Delaware. They have also been found in Argentina, Brazil, the British Virgin Islands, Colombia, Mexico, Panama, Puerto Rico, Suriname, Trinidad and Tobago and Venezuela. They are more abundant in mud bottoms rather than sand bottoms within inlets, commonly at depths of 8.9 to 26.5 m. The Atlantic brief squid is unique among cephalopods as an osmoconformer, meaning that their body salinity matches that of ambient water salinity. They are known to tolerate low salinity levels, down to about half normal marine salinity (17.9‰), but only slightly lower salinities (16.5‰) kill it in about 48 hours. Their tolerance is regarded as exceptional among cephalopods.
