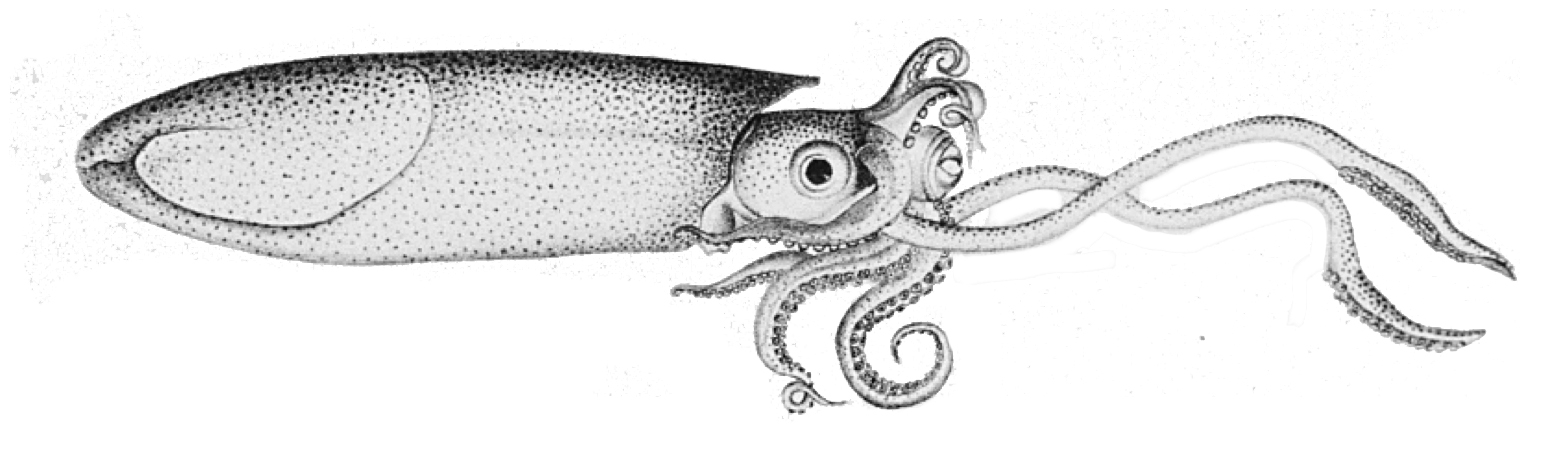
- Lolliguncula brevis

Scientific classification
- Kingdom: Animalia
- Phylum: Mollusca
- Class: Cephalopoda
- Order: Myopsida
- Family: Loliginidae
- Genus: Lolliguncula; Steenstrup, 1881

Type species
- Loligo brevis Blainville, 1823

= Lolliguncula =

Genus of squids

Lolliguncula is a genus of squid from the family Loliginidae from the eastern Pacific and western Atlantic, known as brief squid. The genus is divided into two subgenera Lolliguncula and Loliolopsis. They are rather small squids with a maximum mantle length of 120mm, that inhabit shallow warm seas, although some species have been recorded in areas of low salinity. They are typified by having a short mantle, which is round at the posterior; and fins that are broader than long, but which have no posterior lobes. The males produce spermatophores with a long cement body and they lack a ventral crest on their hectocotylus. Their suckers have square teeth which ring the entire margin or are placed distally. The males do not have enlarged suckers on the left ventral arm. The tentacular club is expanded and contains suckers in four series. The two subgenera differ in the morphology of the hectocotylus.

== Species ==
The following species are classified under Lolliguncula:

- Subgenus Lolliguncula (Loliolopsis) Berry, 1929
  - Lolliguncula diomedeae (Hoyle, 1904) dart squid
- Subgenus Lolliguncula (Lolliguncula) Steenstrup, 1881
  - Lolliguncula argus Brakoniecki & Roper, 1985 Argus brief squid or Argus thumbstall squid
  - Lolliguncula brevis (Blainville, 1823) Atlantic brief squid or Atlantic thumbstall squid
  - Lolliguncula panamensis Berry, 1911 Panama brief squid or Panama thumbstall squid
