= Lolliguncula argus =

Conservation status
- Data Deficient (IUCN 3.1)

Scientific classification
- Kingdom: Animalia
- Phylum: Mollusca
- Class: Cephalopoda
- Order: Myopsida
- Family: Loliginidae
- Genus: Lolliguncula
- Species: L. argus

Binomial name
- Lolliguncula argus Brakoniecki & Roper, 1985

Species of squid

Lolliguncula argus, commonly known as the Argus brief squid or the Argus thumbstall squid, is a species of squid in the family Loliginidae. It is a coastal species, found in the eastern Pacific, near Ecuador and Costa Rica.

== Description ==
Due to its morphological characteristics, L. argus could easily be confused with other species of its genus.It is found on soft bottoms and within the water column, and the depths that it inhabits are usually between 0 and 70 m from the surface. L. Argus has a maximum mantle sizes are 30 mm for males and 39 mm for females. It is the only known myopsid to have its primary hectocotylization on the right ventral arm instead of the left.

== Anatomy ==
Lolliguncula argus is mainly characterized by their short, blunt mantle. The mantle has small fins, which are elliptical and take up about 25% of the total mantle length. Its tentacles are short and compact, without buccal suckers.

== Mating & habits ==
The ovulation pattern in L. argus is asynchronous, with multiple-batch spawning in a relatively short period of time. It breeds in the coastal waters off Puerto Ángel and in the Gulf of Tehuantepec. From some squid samples, three squid were discovered to have sardines in their stomachs.
