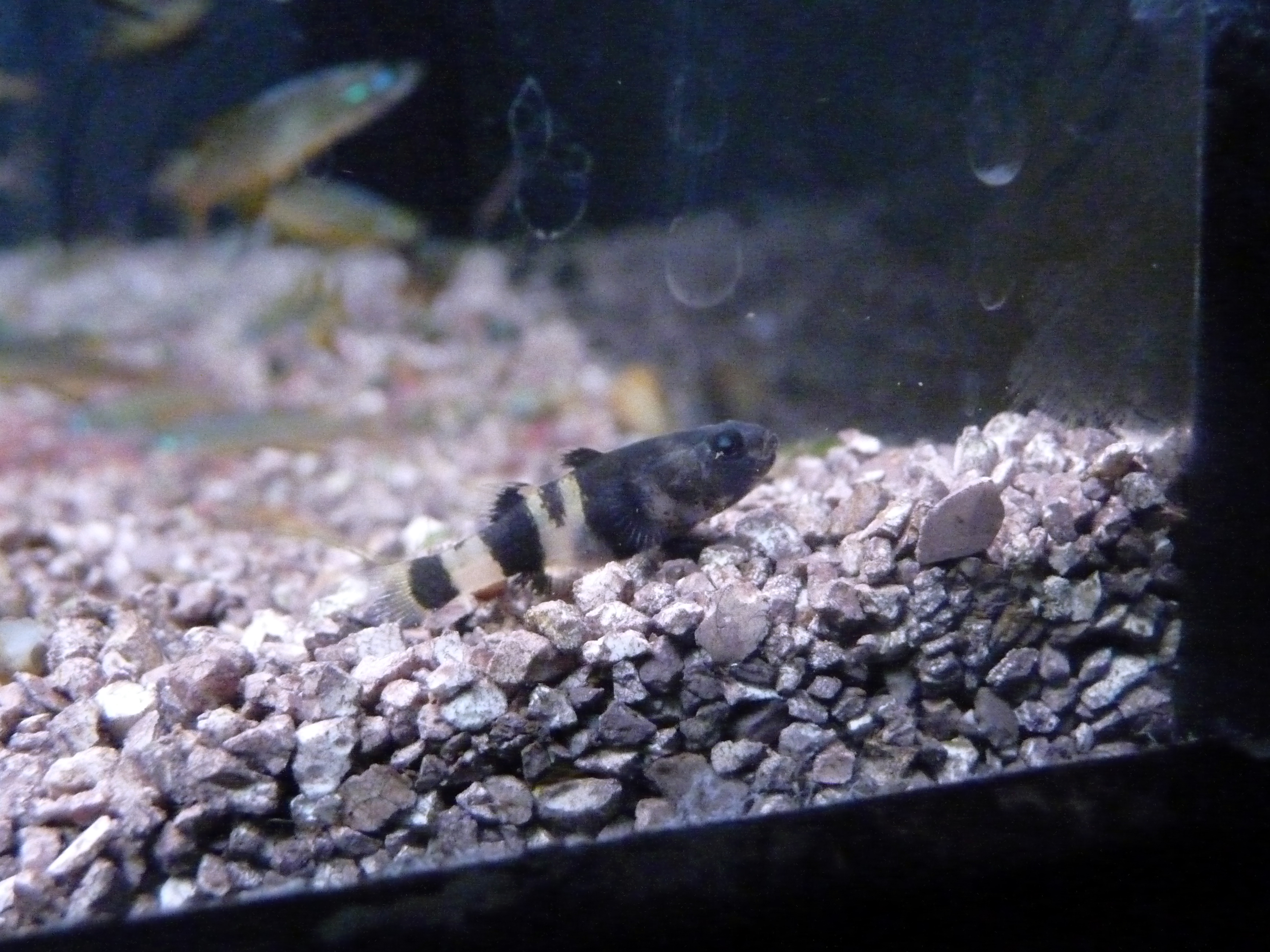
- Bumblebee Fish (B. xanthozonus)

Scientific classification
- Kingdom: Animalia
- Phylum: Chordata
- Class: Actinopterygii
- Division: Teleostei
- Order: Gobiiformes
- Family: Oxudercidae
- Subfamily: Gobionellinae
- Genus: Brachygobius; Bleeker, 1874

Type species
- Gobius doriae Günther, 1868

Synonyms
- Hypogymnogobius Bleeker, 1874; Thaigobiella H. M. Smith, 1931

= Brachygobius =

Genus of fishes

Brachygobius is a small genus of gobies. They are popular aquarium fish where a number of species are sold as bumblebee gobies because their colours are similar to those of bumblebees.

== Morphology ==
Bumblebee gobies range in size from 1.5 cm to 4 cm. They are generally coloured black with pale yellow to orange bands. Males are generally slimmer than females and often have more vivid colours, typically orange rather than yellow. Females may also have smaller and rounder heads. When spawning, the colours of the males become deeper, the orange bands becoming red in the case of Brachygobius doriae.

== Taxonomy ==
This genus is informally divided by taxonomists into the dwarf Brachygobius nunus-species group (e.g., B. nunus, B. aggregatus, and B. mekongensis) and the bigger Brachygobius doriae-species group (e.g., B. doriae, B. sabanus, and B. xanthomelas).

== Species ==
There are currently ten recognized species in this genus:

- Brachygobius aggregatus Herre, 1940 (Schooling bumblebee goby)
- Brachygobius doriae (Günther, 1868) (Bumblebee goby)
- Brachygobius jennie (Tian, 2026) (Jennie's bumblebee goby)
- Brachygobius kabiliensis Inger, 1958 (Kabili bumblebee goby)
- Brachygobius mekongensis Larson & Vidthayanon, 2000
- Brachygobius nunus (F. Hamilton, 1822)
- Brachygobius sabanus Inger, 1958
- Brachygobius sua (H. M. Smith, 1931)
- Brachygobius xanthomelas Herre, 1937
- Brachygobius xanthozonus (Bleeker, 1849) (Bumblebee fish)

== Ecology ==
Bumblebee gobies are found across Southern and Southeast Asia primarily in freshwater habitats but also in slightly brackish waters.

== Reproduction ==
These gobies are oviparous. Eggs are deposited in a cave where they are guarded by the male. Clutch size is around 150–200 eggs. The eggs hatch after around seven days and the fry become free swimming another five to seven days later.

== In the aquarium ==
Bumblebee gobies are popular aquarium fish. A tank around 40 liters in size will house a dozen specimens comfortably. Under good conditions, they can live in an aquarium for around 5 years. The most commonly traded species in the hobby belong to the Brachygobius doriae-species group but the smaller Brachygobius nunus is also traded occasionally. Although many aquarium books use the name Brachygobius xanthozona, this species is very rare in the wild and is not commercially traded.
