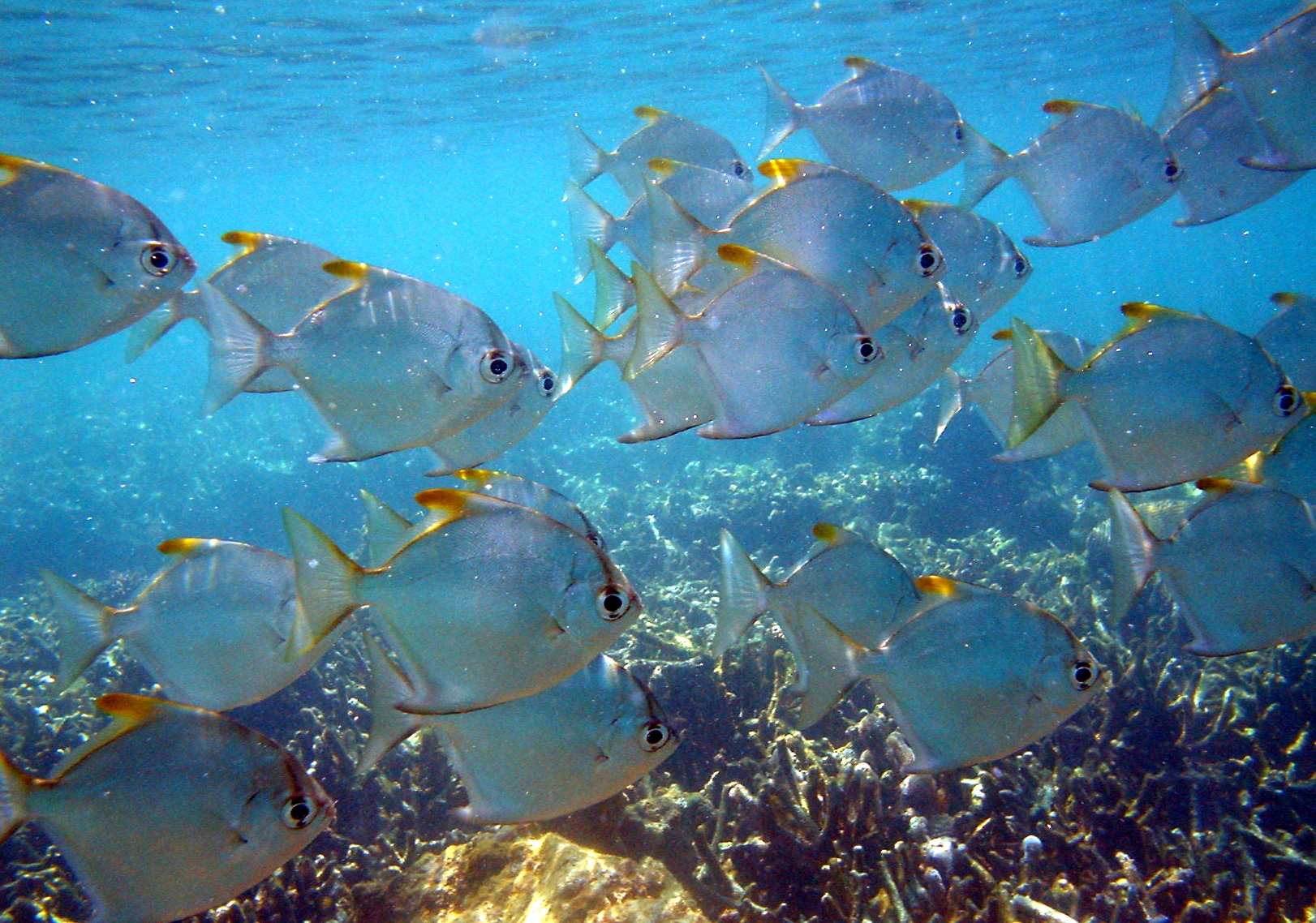
- Silver moony, Monodactylus argenteus

Scientific classification
- Kingdom: Animalia
- Phylum: Chordata
- Class: Actinopterygii
- Order: Acanthuriformes
- Family: Monodactylidae; D. S. Jordan & Evermann, 1898

Genera
- Monodactylus; †Pasaichthys; †Psettopsis

= Monodactylidae =

Monodactylidae Temporal range: Early Eocene to present

Family of fishes

Monodactylidae is a family of acanthuriform bony fish commonly referred to as monos, moonyfishes or fingerfishes. All are strongly laterally compressed with disc-shaped bodies and tall anal and dorsal fins. Unusually for fish, scales occur on their dorsal fins and sometimes on the anal fins. The pelvic fins are small, sometimes vestigial. They are of moderate size, typically around 25 centimetres (9.8 in) in length, and Monodactylus sebae can be taller than it is long, measuring up to 30 centimetres (12 in) from the tip of the dorsal fin down to the tip of the anal fin. These long, scaly fins have given them the name "fingerfishes". Most are silvery with yellow and black markings; the juveniles are especially attractive, and most species are popular as aquarium fish.

== Taxonomy ==
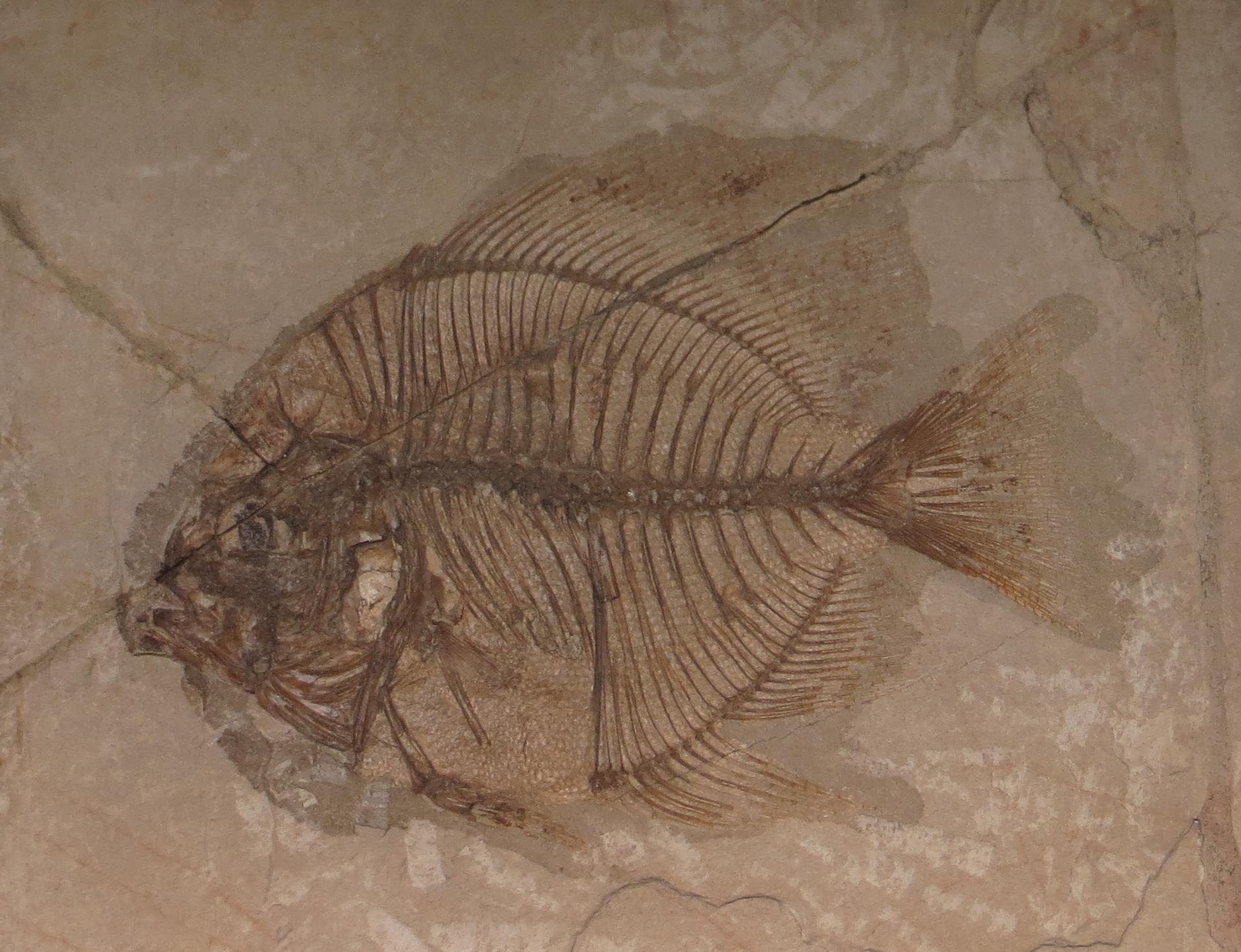
Fossil specimen of Psettopsis

The family contains only a single extant genus, Monodactylus. They are distributed along the coastlines of Africa, India, and southern Asia, and as far west as Australia. Species of Monodactylus in particular commonly occur in estuaries. They are truly euryhaline and can live in fresh water for extended periods. Moonyfishes are predators and feed primarily on smaller fish and invertebrates. They are found primarily in shallow water and form large shoals. Two extinct genera, †Psettopsis Blot, 1969 and †Pasaichthys Blot, 1969, are known as fossils from the Early Eocene-aged lagerstatten of Monte Bolca, Eocene, in Italy.

The genus Schuettea closely resembles members of Monodactylus, and was formerly also placed in the family. However, phylogenetic evidence suggests that the two belong to different orders, with Schuettea belonging to Acropomatiformes.

== In aquaria ==
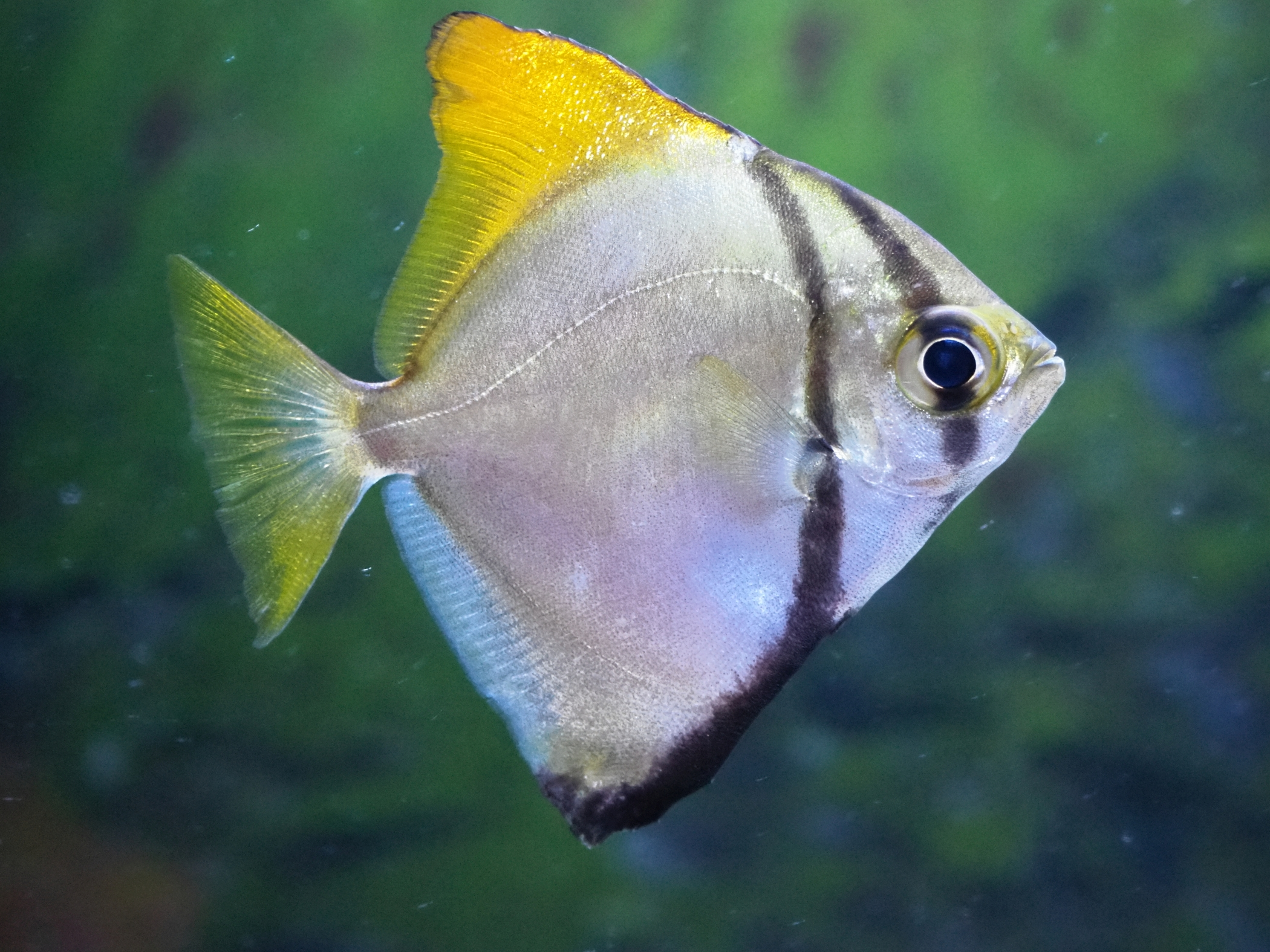
The species Monodactylus argenteus is a popular salt-water aquarium fish.

Aquarists commonly keep M. argenteus and M. sebae as pets in domestic aquaria, where they are known as monos or Malayan angels; they are also widely kept in public aquaria. They are hardy and easy to care for, but require brackish water and copious swimming space. .
