= Lists of aquarium life =

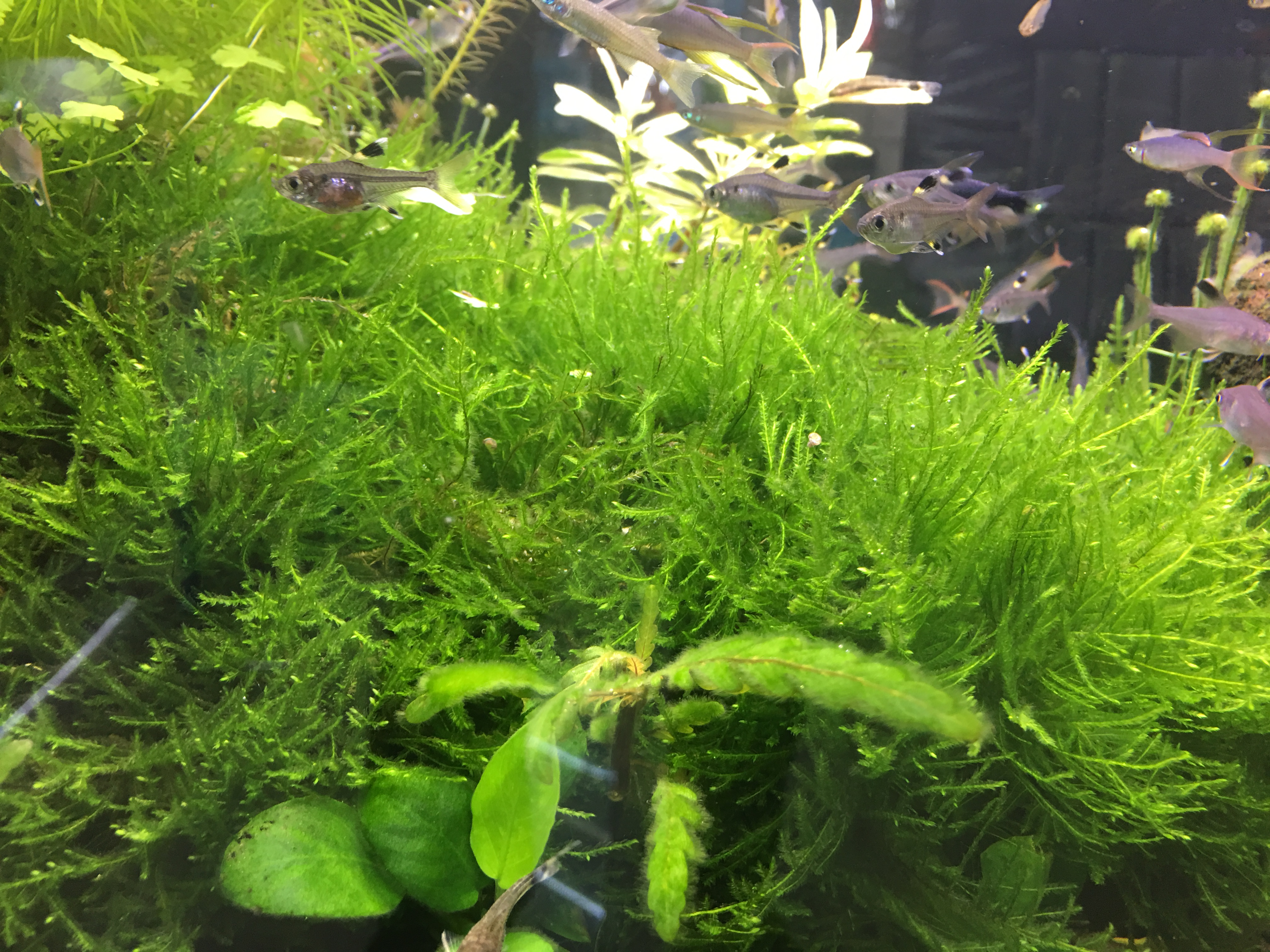
Freshwater aquarium

Lists of aquarium life include lists of fish, amphibians, invertebrates and plants in freshwater, brackish and marine aquariums. In fishkeeping, suitable species of aquarium fish, plants and other organisms vary with the size, water chemistry and temperature of the aquarium.

In cases where alien species (such as aquarium or aquaculture fish) are regularly released into the natural environment but cannot reproduce due to climatic or biotic constraints, a phenomenon known as "conditional invasion" occurs. In such ecosystems, temporary "pseudopopulations" may form. While these do not pose a long-term threat to native communities, they require ongoing monitoring of their introduction pathways to prevent potential chronic contamination of the ecosystem.

Freshwater-specific lists:

- List of freshwater aquarium amphibian species
- List of freshwater aquarium fish species
- List of freshwater aquarium invertebrate species
- List of freshwater aquarium plant species

Brackish-specific lists

- List of brackish aquarium fish species
- List of brackish aquarium invertebrate species
- List of brackish aquarium plant species

Marine-specific lists:

- List of marine aquarium fish species
- List of marine aquarium invertebrate species
