= Aquarium =

Transparent tank of water for fish and water-dwelling species

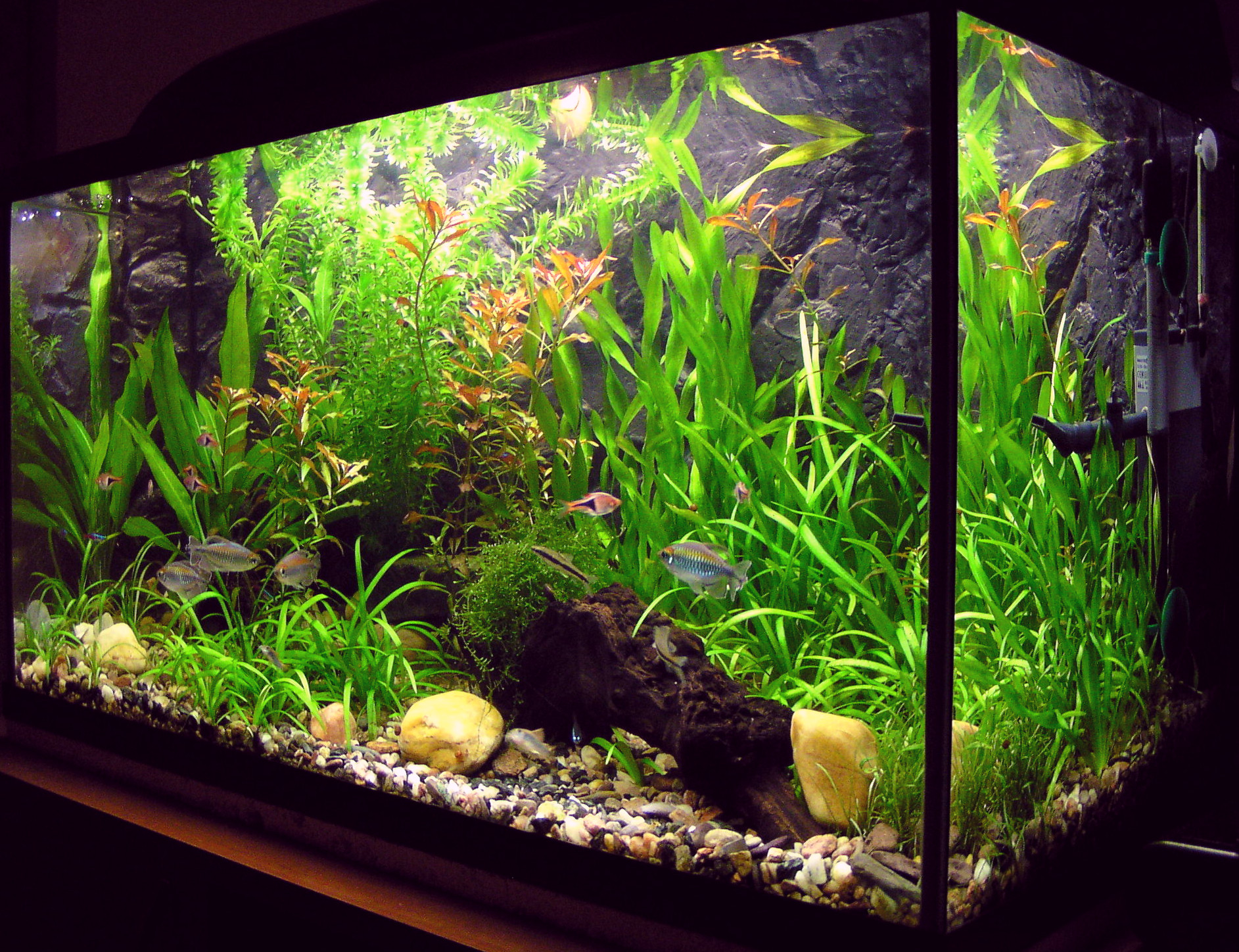
A freshwater aquarium with plants and various tropical fish

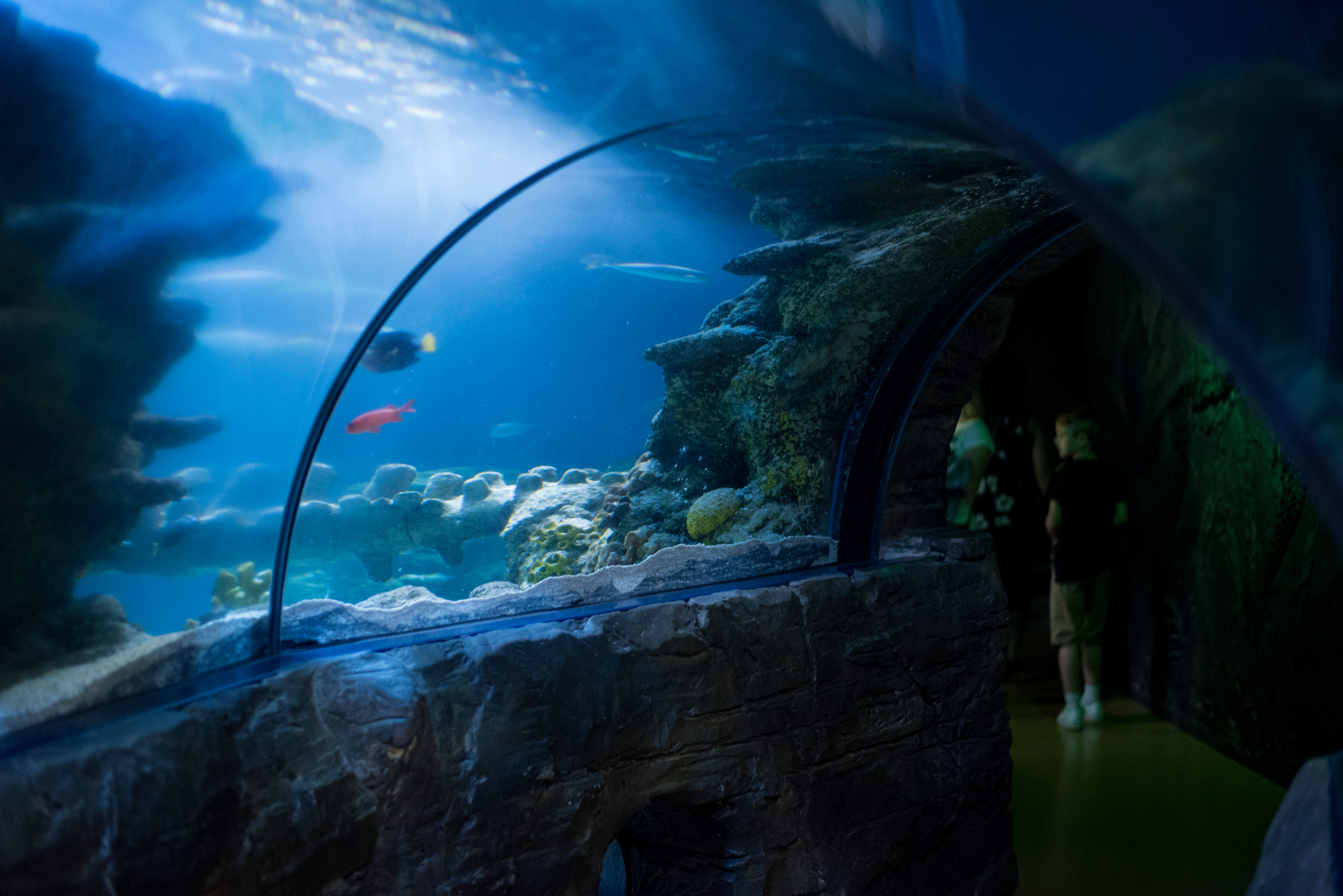
The underwater tunnel in the Sea Life London aquarium

An aquarium (pl.: aquariums or aquaria) is a vivarium of any size having at least one transparent side in which aquatic plants or animals are kept and displayed. Fishkeepers use aquaria to keep fish, invertebrates, amphibians, aquatic reptiles, such as turtles, and aquatic plants. The term aquarium, coined by English naturalist Philip Henry Gosse, combines the Latin root aqua, meaning "water," with the suffix -arium, meaning "a place for relating to or connected with."

The aquarium principle was fully developed in 1850 by the chemist Robert Warington, who explained that aquatic plants placed in a container of water could produce enough oxygen to support animals, so long as the numbers of animals did not grow too large. The aquarium craze was launched in early Victorian England by Gosse, who created and stocked the first public aquarium at the London Zoo in 1853, and published the first manual, The Aquarium: An Unveiling of the Wonders of the Deep Sea in 1854. Small aquariums are kept in the home by hobbyists. There are large public aquariums in many cities. Public aquariums keep fish and other aquatic animals in large tanks. A large aquarium may have otters, dolphins, sharks, penguins, seals, and whales. Many aquarium tanks also have plants.

An aquarist owns fish or maintains an aquarium, typically constructed of glass or high-strength acrylic. Aquaria with flat walls are known as fish tanks or simply tanks, while those with rounded walls are known as fish bowls. Size can range from a small glass bowl, a few liters in volume, to immense public aquaria of thousands of liters. Specialized equipment maintains appropriate water quality and other characteristics suitable for the aquarium's residents.

== History and popularization ==
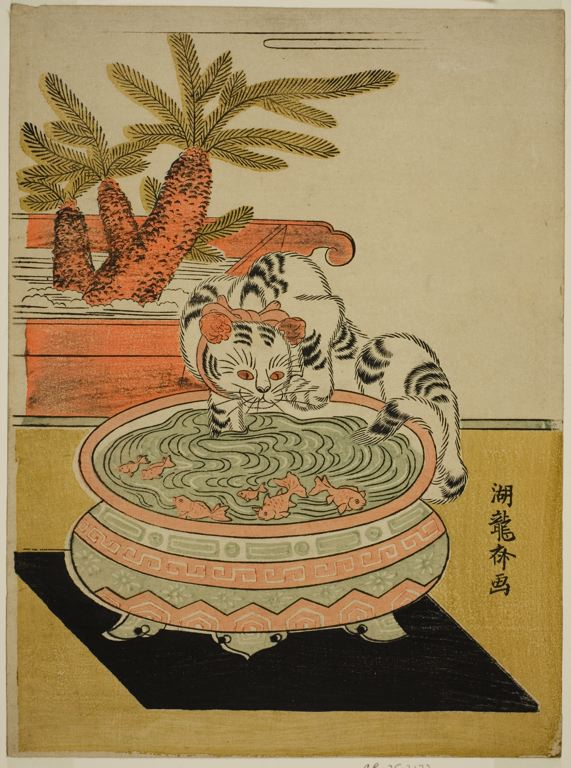
Cat and fishbowl, by Isoda Koryusai. Original c. 1775.

=== Antiquity ===
In 1369, the Hongwu Emperor of China established a porcelain company that produced large porcelain tubs for maintaining goldfish; over time, people produced tubs that approached the shape of modern fish bowls. Leonhard Baldner, who wrote Vogel-, Fisch- und Tierbuch (Bird, Fish, and Animal Book) in 1666, maintained weather loaches and newts. It is sometimes held that the aquarium was invented by the Romans, who are said to have kept sea barbels in marble-and-glass tanks, but scholars doubt the veracity of this.

=== Nineteenth century ===
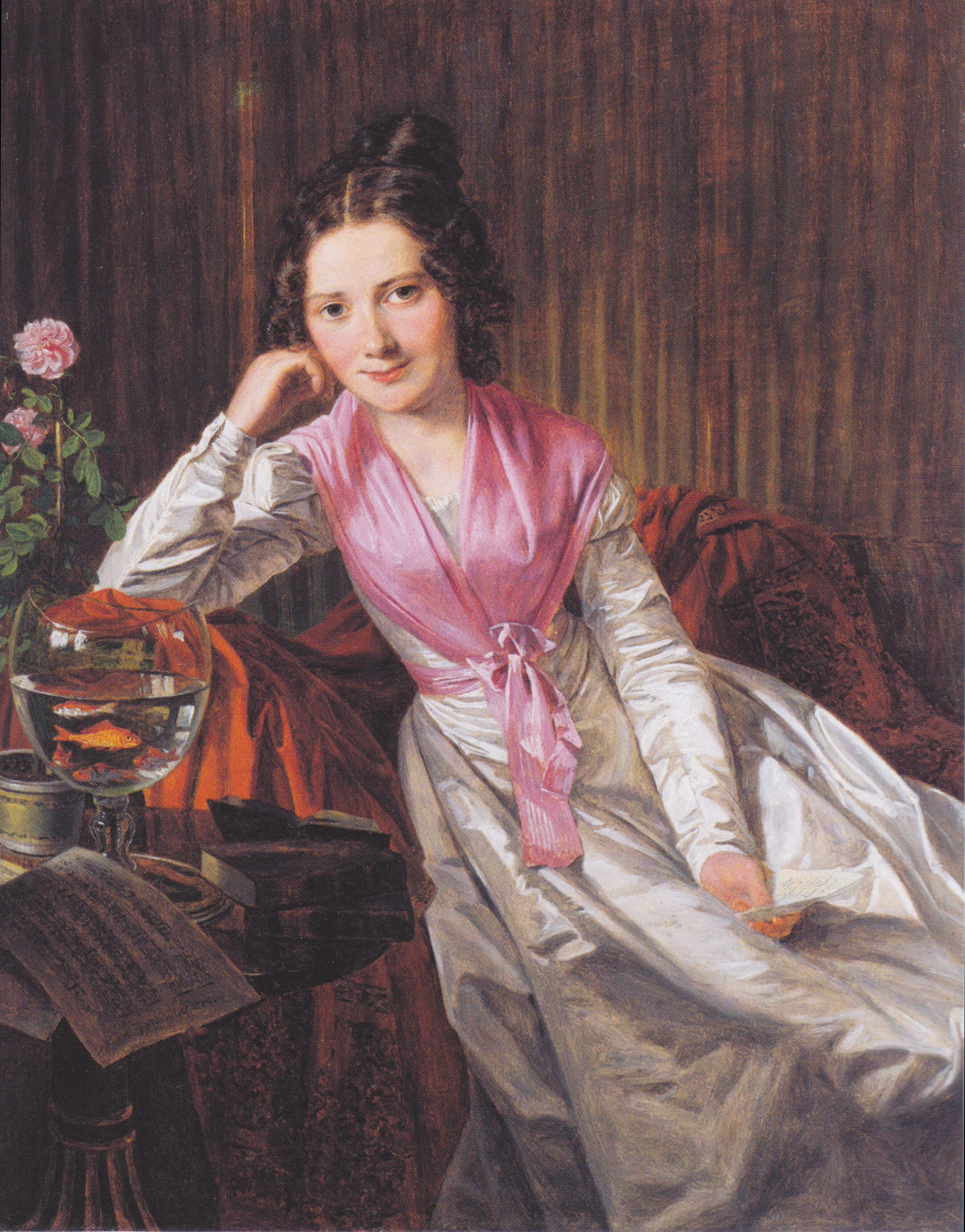
Goldfish in a glass: portrait of Therese Krones, 1824

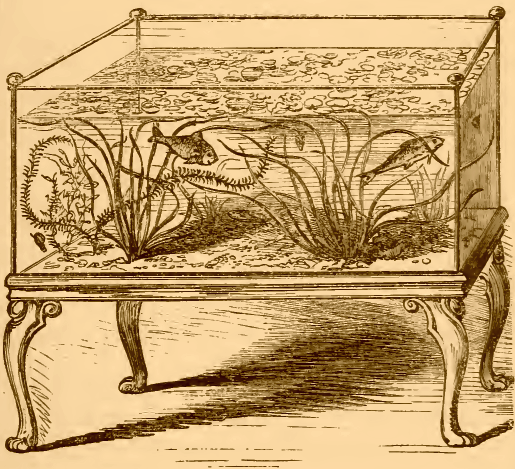
An aquarium of the 1850s containing Vallisneria spiralis and coldwater fish from The Book of the Aquarium and Water Cabinet (London 1856), by Shirley Hibberd.

In 1832, Jeanne Villepreux-Power, a pioneering French marine biologist, became the first person to create aquaria for experimenting with aquatic organisms. This experimentation led to several discoveries, including the first direct evidence that argonauts, a marine cephalopod, create their own shells. In 1836, soon after his invention of the Wardian case, Dr. Nathaniel Bagshaw Ward proposed to use his tanks for tropical animals. In 1841 he did so, though only with aquatic plants and toy fish. However, he soon housed real animals. In 1838, Félix Dujardin noted owning a saltwater aquarium, though he did not use the term. In 1846, Anne Thynne maintained stony corals and seaweed for almost three years, and was credited as the creator of the first balanced marine aquarium in London. English chemist Robert Warington experimented with a 13-gallon container, which contained goldfish, eelgrass, and snails, creating one of the first stable aquaria. The aquarium principle was fully developed by Warington, explaining that plants added to water in a container would give off enough oxygen to support animals, so long as their numbers do not grow too large. He published his findings in 1850 in the Chemical Society's journal.

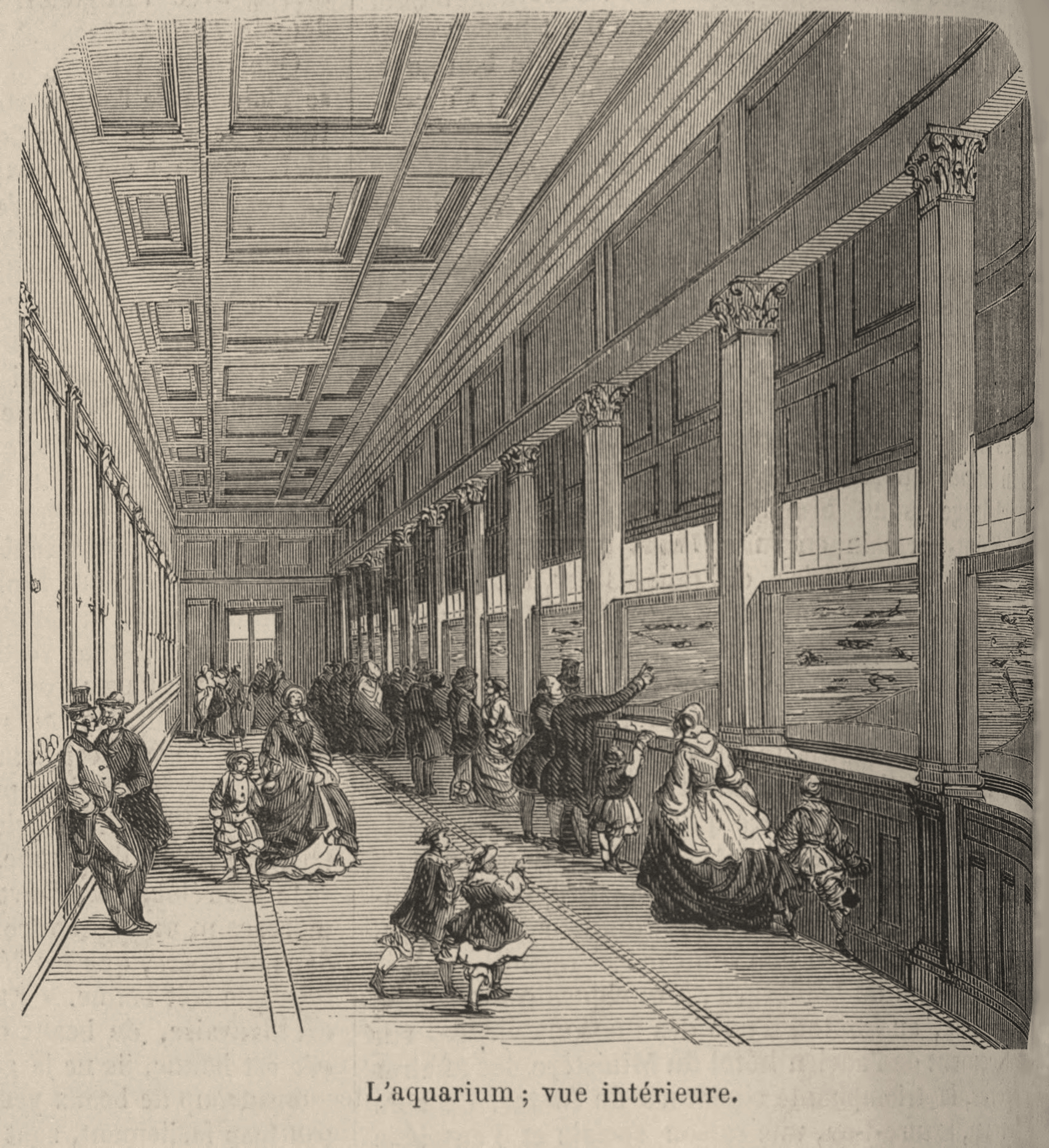
The Jardin zoologique at the Bois de Boulogne included an aquarium that housed both fresh and saltwater animals, 1860 in Paris.

The keeping of fish in an aquarium became a popular hobby and spread quickly. In the United Kingdom, it became popular after ornate aquaria in cast-iron frames were featured at the Great Exhibition of 1851. In 1853, the aquarium craze was launched in England, spreading from there to Germany, the United States and France as the result of the publications and activity of Philip Henry Gosse, the marine zoologist known as the "Father of the Aquarium". He created and stocked the first public aquarium at the London Zoo in Regent's Park, which came to be known as the Fish House. The Regent's Park aquarium, initially indiscriminately referred to as the "Fish House", "Vivarium", "Aquavivarium" or "Marine vivarium", soon yielded to the word "aquarium", a term coined by Gosse used as the title of his 1854 book The Aquarium: An Unveiling of the Wonders of the Deep Water. In this book, Gosse primarily discussed saltwater aquaria. The high-water mark of the popular aquarium movement in Britain lasted from 1853 to 1860. Tank designs and techniques for maintaining water quality were developed by Warington, later cooperating with Gosse until his critical review of the tank water composition. Edward Edwards developed these glass-fronted aquaria in his 1858 patent for a "dark-water-chamber slope-back tank", with water slowly circulating to a reservoir beneath.

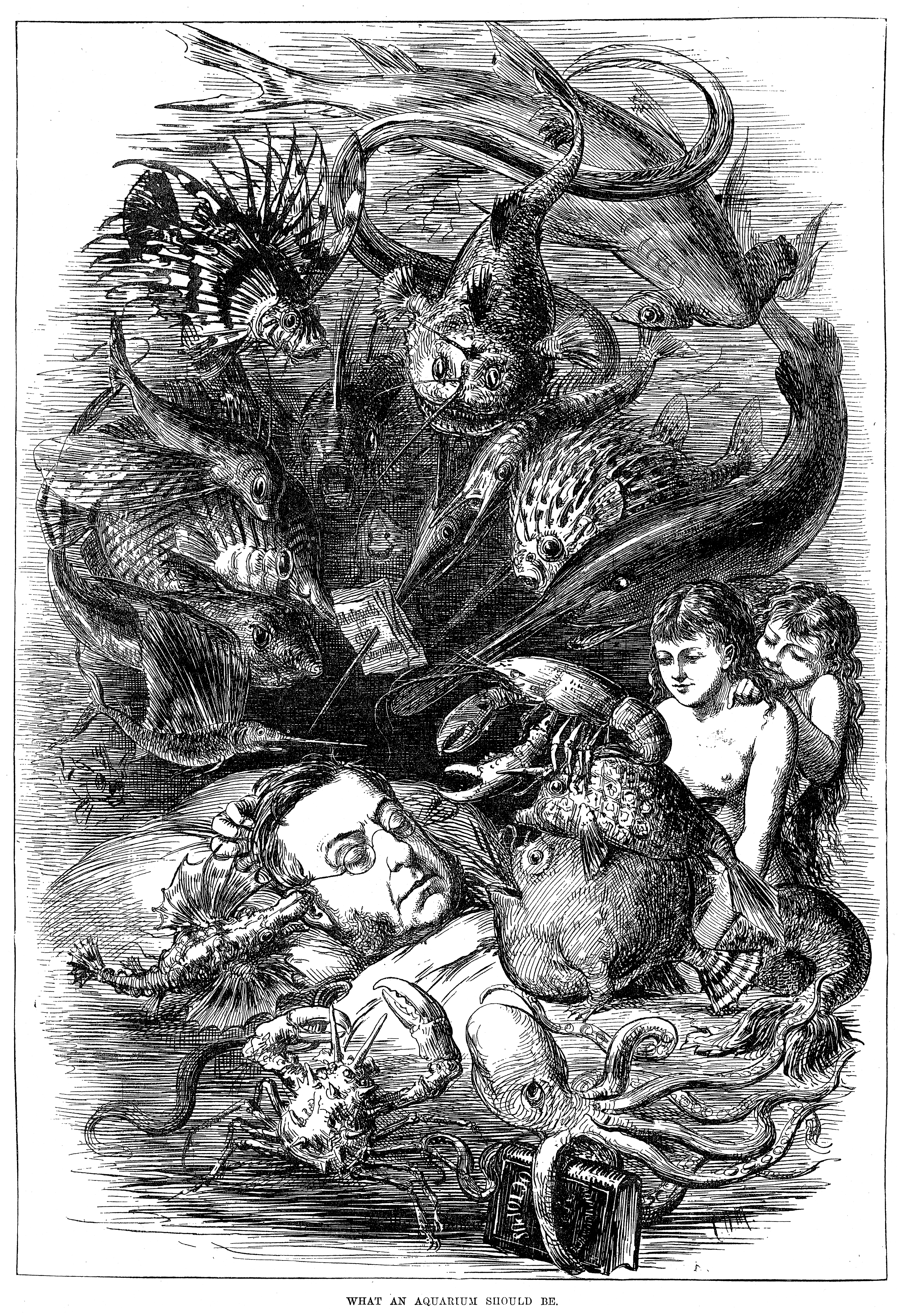
"What an Aquarium Should Be" – a humorous 1876 British engraving, apparently showing Thomas Huxley dreaming about sea creatures

Influenced by Gosse, the German Emil Adolf Rossmässler promoted the value of the aquarium movement in the educational field. Rossmässler wrote of its use in an 1855 article in Die Gartenlaube (The Gazebo) and in his 1857 book Das Susswasser-Aquarium (The Freshwater Aquarium), the freshwater aquarium being much easier to maintain in landlocked areas. In 1862 William Alford Lloyd, then bankrupt because of the craze in England being over, moved to Grindel Dammthor, Hamburg, to supervise the installation of the circulating system and tanks at the Hamburg Aquarium. During the 1870s, some of the first aquarist societies were appearing in Germany. The United States soon followed. Published in 1858, Henry D. Butler's The Family Aquarium was one of the first books written in the United States solely about the aquarium. According to the July issue of The North American Review of the same year, William Stimson may have owned some of the first functional aquaria, and had as many as seven or eight. Henry Bishop, a bird and fish dealer in Baltimore ("Goldfish King"), is credited with revolutionizing the aquarium business in the US, selling a wide range of tanks and supplies beginning in the 1870s-1880s. The first aquarist society in the United States was founded in New York City in 1893, followed by others. The New York Aquarium Journal, first published in October 1876, is considered to be the world's first aquarium magazine.

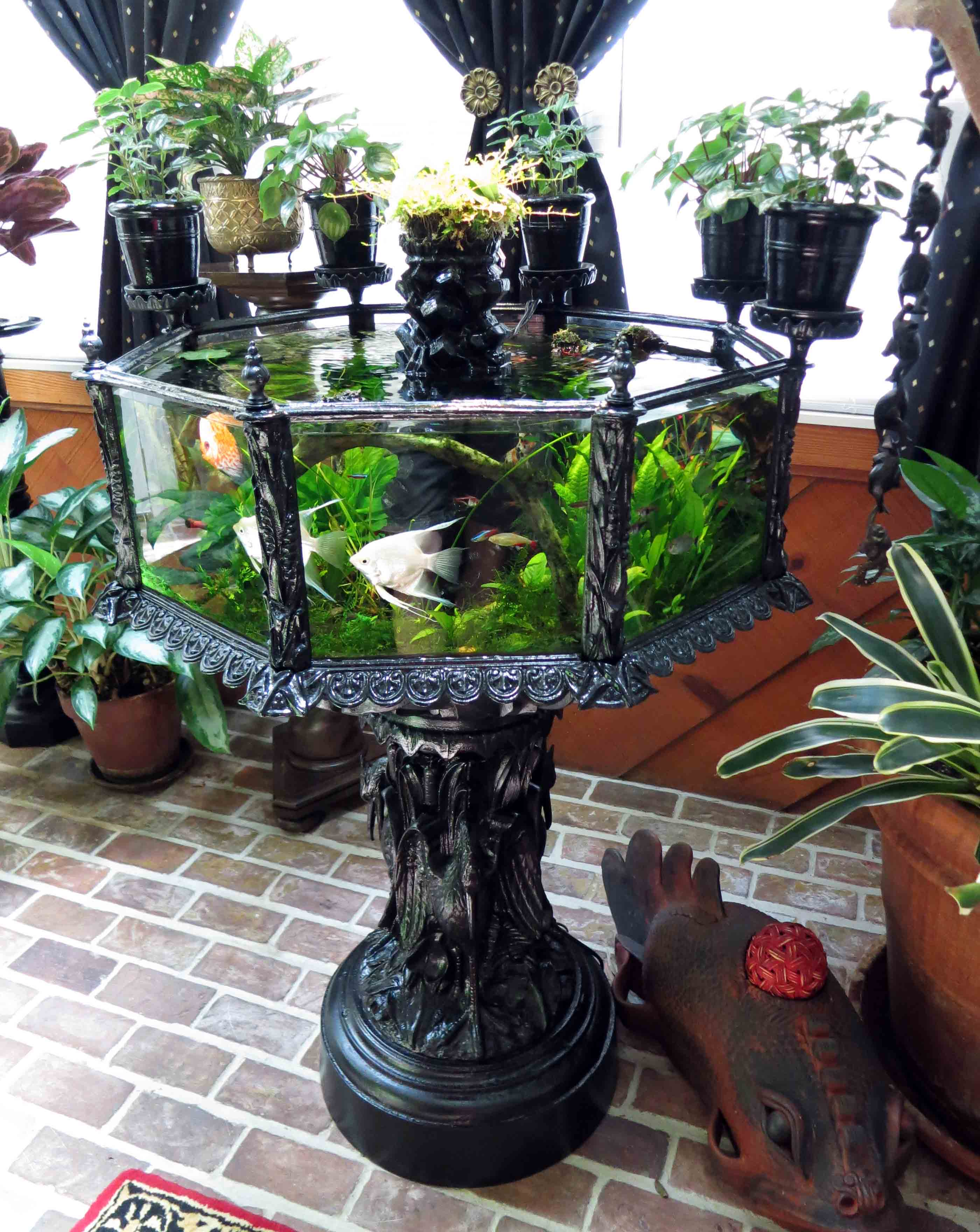
An antique cast-iron aquarium made by J. W. Fiske & Company in the 1880s, New York City

In the Victorian era in the United Kingdom, a common design for the home aquarium was a glass front with the other sides made of wood (made watertight with a pitch coating). The bottom would be made of slate and heated from below. More advanced systems soon began to be introduced, along with tanks of glass in metal frames. During the latter half of the 19th century, a variety of aquarium designs were explored, such as hanging the aquarium on a wall, mounting it as part of a window, or even combining it with a birdcage.

=== Twentieth century ===
Around 1908, the first mechanical aquarium air pump was invented, powered by running water, instead of electricity. The introduction of the air pump into the hobby is considered by several historians of the hobby to be a pivotal moment in its development.

Pike in an aquarium c. 1908, at the Belle Isle Aquarium, Belle Isle Park, Detroit, Michigan

Aquaria became more widely popular as houses had an electricity supply after World War I. Electricity allowed artificial lighting, as well as aeration, filtration, and heating of the water. Initially, amateur aquarists kept native fish (with the exception of goldfish); the availability of exotic species from overseas further increased the popularity of the aquarium. Jugs made from a variety of materials were used to import fish from overseas, with a bicycle foot pump for aeration. Plastic shipping bags were introduced in the 1950s, making it easier to ship fish. The eventual availability of air freight allowed fish to be successfully imported from distant regions. Popular publications started by Herbert R. Axelrod influenced many more hobbyists to start keeping fish. In the 1960s, metal frames made marine aquaria almost impossible due to corrosion, but the development of tar and silicone sealant allowed the first all-glass aquaria made by Martin Horowitz in Los Angeles, CA. The frames remained, however, though purely for aesthetic reasons.

Japan played an increasingly important role in shaping aquarium design in the latter part of the twentieth century, with the aquascaping designs of Takashi Amano influencing fishkeepers to treat home aquariums as aesthetically pleasing compositions, rather than simply as a way of displaying fish specimens.

In the United States, as of 1996, aquarium keeping is the second-most popular hobby after stamp collecting. In 1999, an estimated 9.6 million US households owned an aquarium. Figures from the 2005/2006 APPMA National Pet Owners Survey report that Americans own approximately 139 million freshwater fish and 9.6 million saltwater fish. Estimates of the numbers of fish kept in aquaria in Germany suggest at least 36 million. The hobby has the strongest following in Europe, Asia, and North America. In the United States, 40% of aquarists maintain two or more tanks.

Over time, there has been an increasing appreciation of the usefulness of access to an aquarium to provide potential stress reduction and improvement of mood in people observing aquatic life. According to the research of having an aquarium is many health benefits like reduce stress, blood pressure and heart rate improvement, better quality sleep, reduce anxiety and pain, therapy of excited children, Alzheimer's therapy and improve productivity.

== Design ==
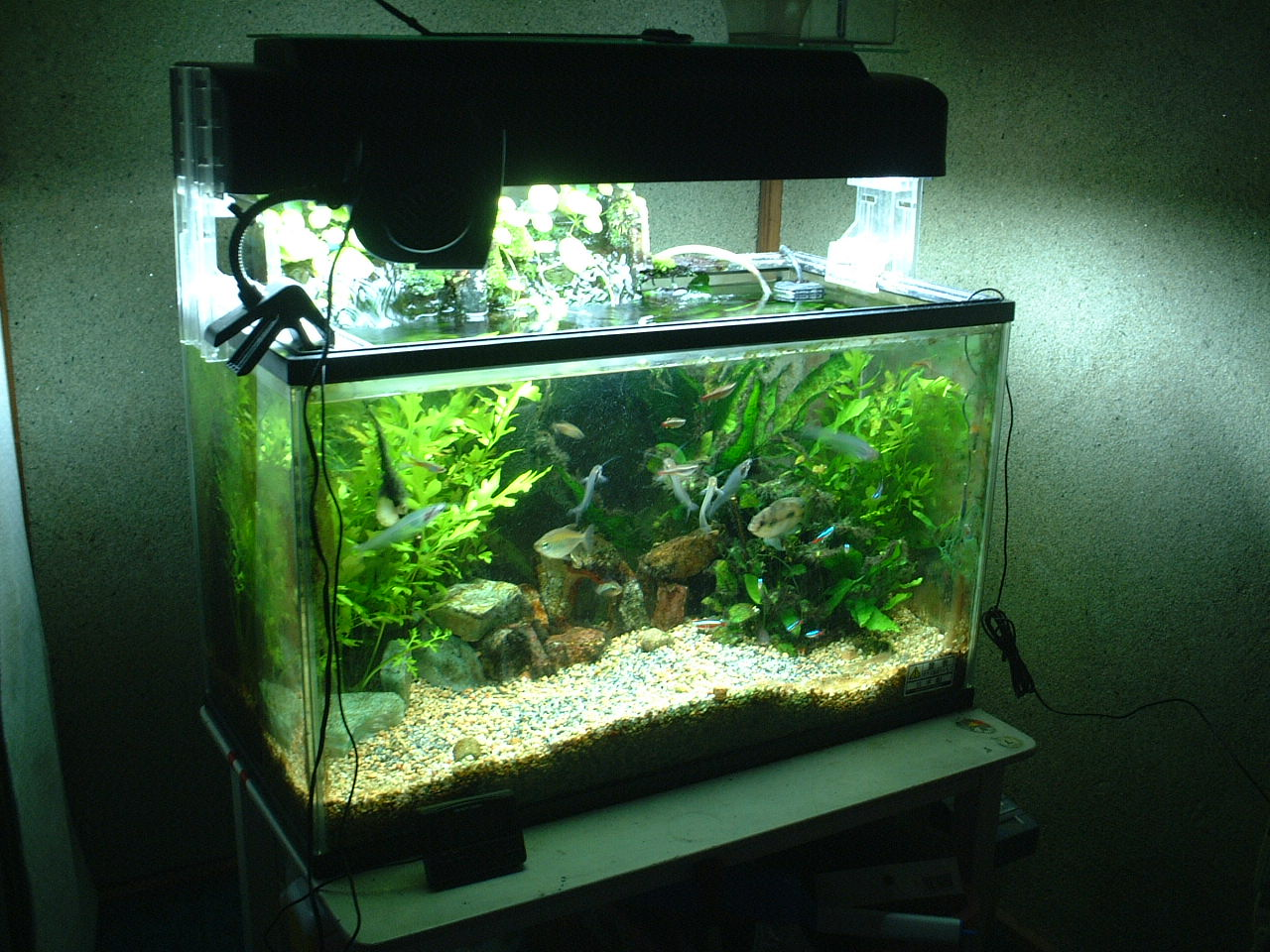
An 80-litre home aquarium

=== Materials ===
==== Glass ====
The first modern aquarium made of glass was developed in the 19th century by Robert Warrington. During the Victorian age, glass aquariums commonly had slate or steel bottoms, which allowed them to be heated underneath by an open-flame heat source. These aquariums had the glass panels attached with metal frames and sealed with putty. Metal-framed aquariums were still available until the mid-1960s, when the modern, silicone-sealed style replaced them. Acrylic aquariums first became available to the public in the 1970s. Laminated glass is sometimes used, which combines the advantages of both glass and acrylic. Today, most aquaria consist of glass panes bonded together by 100% silicone sealant, with plastic frames attached to the upper and lower edges for decoration. The glass aquarium is standard for sizes up to about 1,000 litres (260 US gal; 220 imp gal). However, glass is brittle and has very little give before fracturing, though generally the sealant fails first. Aquaria are made in a variety of shapes, such as cuboid, hexagonal, angled to fit in a corner (L-shaped), and bow-front (the front side curves outwards). Fish bowls are generally either made of plastic or glass, and are either spherical or some other round configuration in shape.

Glass aquaria have been a popular choice for many home and hobbyist aquarists for many years. Once silicone sealant became strong enough to ensure a long-term water-tight seal, it eliminated the need for a structural frame. In addition to lower cost, glass aquaria are more scratch resistant than acrylic. Although the price is one of the main considerations for aquarists when deciding which of these two types of aquaria to purchase, for very large tanks, the price difference tends to disappear.

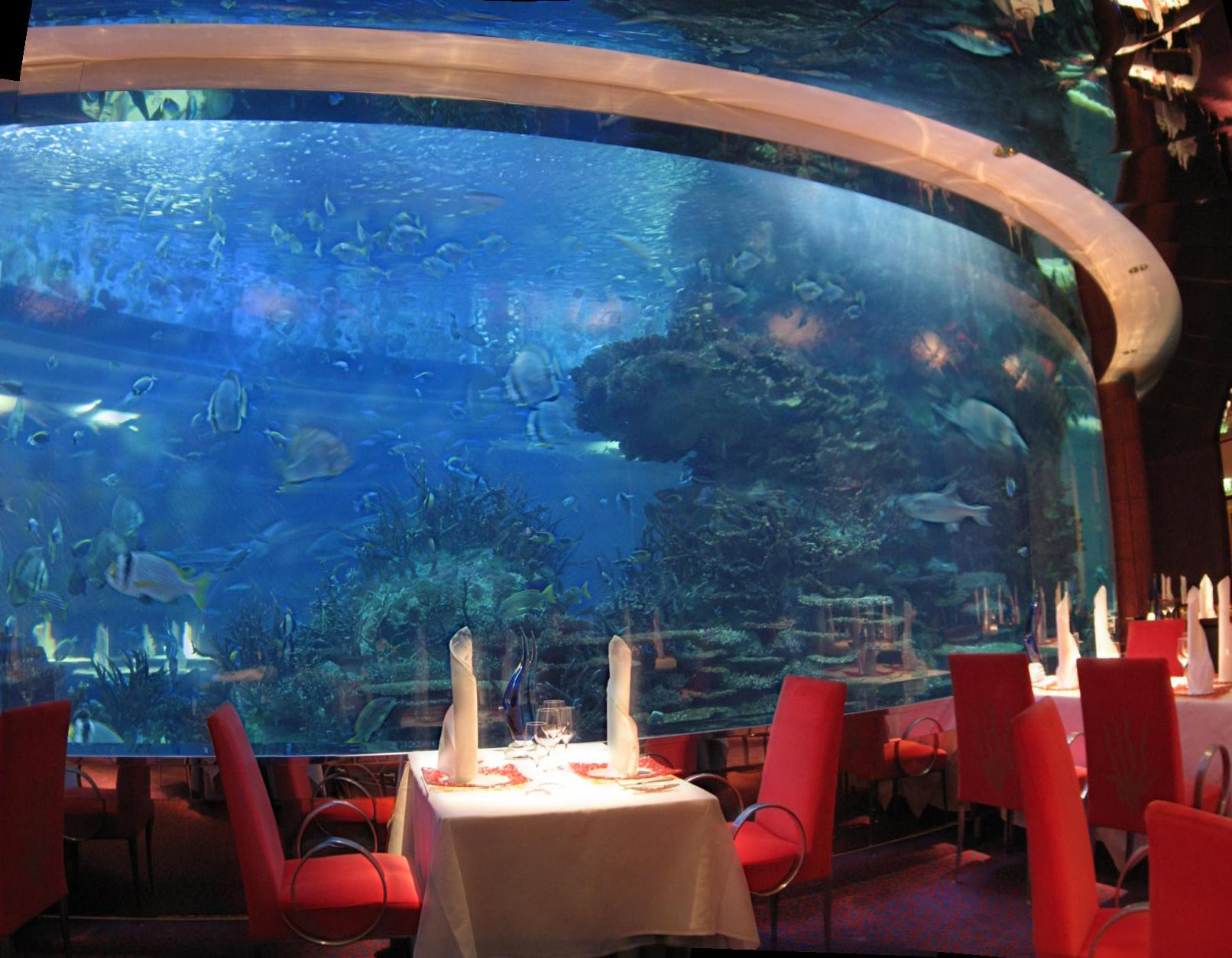
An aquarium in the Burj Al Arab in Dubai

==== Acrylic ====
Acrylic aquaria are now the primary competitor with glass. Prior to the invention of UV stabilization, early acrylic aquaria discolored over time with exposure to light; this is no longer the case. Acrylic is generally stronger than glass, weighs less, and provides a certain amount of temperature insulation. In colder climates or environments, it is easier to achieve and maintain a tropical temperature and requires less capacity from an aquarium heater. Acrylic-soluble cements are used to directly fuse acrylic together. Acrylic allows for the formation of unusual shapes, such as the hexagonal tank. Acrylics are easier to scratch than glass, but unlike glass, scratches in acrylic can be polished out.

==== Other materials ====
Large aquaria might instead use stronger materials such as fiberglass-reinforced plastics. However, this material is not transparent. Reinforced concrete is used for aquaria where weight and space are not factors. Concrete must be coated with a waterproof layer to prevent the water from breaking down the concrete, as well as preventing contamination of the water by the concrete.

Plywood can also be used when building aquaria. The benefits of using plywood include: lower construction costs, less weight, and better insulation. A popular positioning choice for plywood aquaria is keeping them in a wall. Here the use of plywood is hidden by sinking the aquarium inside the wall. Putting insulation between the two helps with the insulation of a heated tank.

=== Styles ===
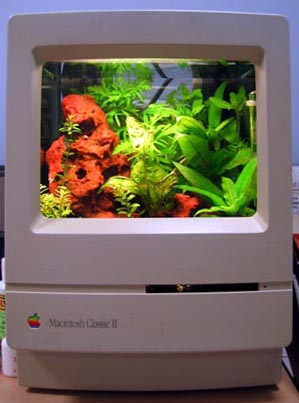
A Macquarium

Objects used for aquariums include: coffee tables, sinks, and even toilets. Another such example is the Macquarium, an aquarium made from the shell of an Apple Macintosh computer. In recent years, elaborate custom-designed home aquariums costing hundreds of thousands of dollars have become status symbols—according to The New York Times, "among people of means, a dazzling aquarium is one of the last surefire ways to impress their peers."

==== Kreisel ====
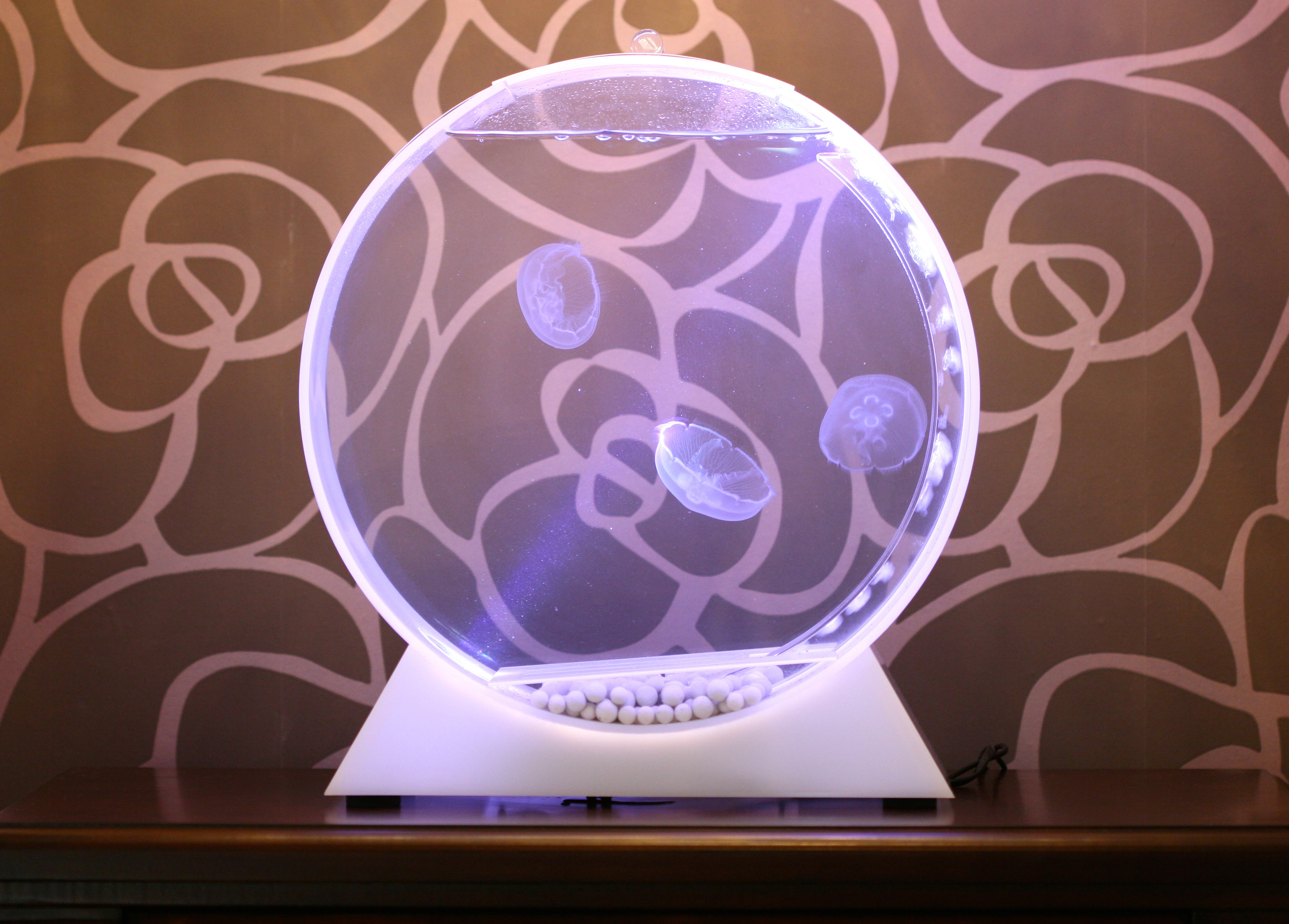
A typical kreisel tank housing several moon jellyfish

A kreisel tank (kreisel being German for "spinning top" or "gyroscope") is an aquarium shaped like a horizontal cylinder that is designed to hold delicate animals such as jellyfish and newborn seahorses. These aquariums provide slow, circular water flow with a bare minimum of interior hardware to prevent the inhabitants from becoming injured by pumps or the tank itself. The tank has no sharp angles around its sides and keeps the housed animals away from plumbing. Water moving into the tank gives a gentle flow that keeps the inhabitants suspended. Water leaves the tank through a screen which prevents animals from being drawn into the pump intake or overflow line.

There are several types of kreisel tanks. In a true kreisel, a circular tank has a circular, submerged lid. Pseudokreisels are "U" or semicircle shaped, usually without a lid. Stretch kreisels are a "double gyre" kreisel design, where the tank length is at least twice the height. Using two downwelling inlets on both sides of the tank lets gravity create two gyres in the tank. A single downwelling inlet may be used in the middle as well. The top of a stretch kreisel may be open or closed with a lid. There may also be screens about midway down the sides of the tank, or at the top on the sides. It is possible to combine these designs; a circular shaped tank is used without a lid or cover, and the surface of the water acts as the continuation of circular flow.

==== Biotope ====
Another popular setup is the biotope aquarium. A biotope aquarium is a recreation of a specific natural environment. Some of the most popular biotopes are the freshwater habitats of the Amazon River, the Rio Negro River, the African rift lake environments of Lake Malawi and Lake Tanganyika, and saltwater coral reefs of Australia, the Red Sea, and the Caribbean Sea. The fish, plants, substrate, rocks, wood, coral, and any other component of the display should completely match that of the local natural environment. It can be a challenge to recreate such environments, and most "true" biotopes will only have a few (if not only one) species of fish and invertebrates.

Finally, an emerging concept for the home is that of a wall mounted aquarium.

=== Aquarium size and volume ===
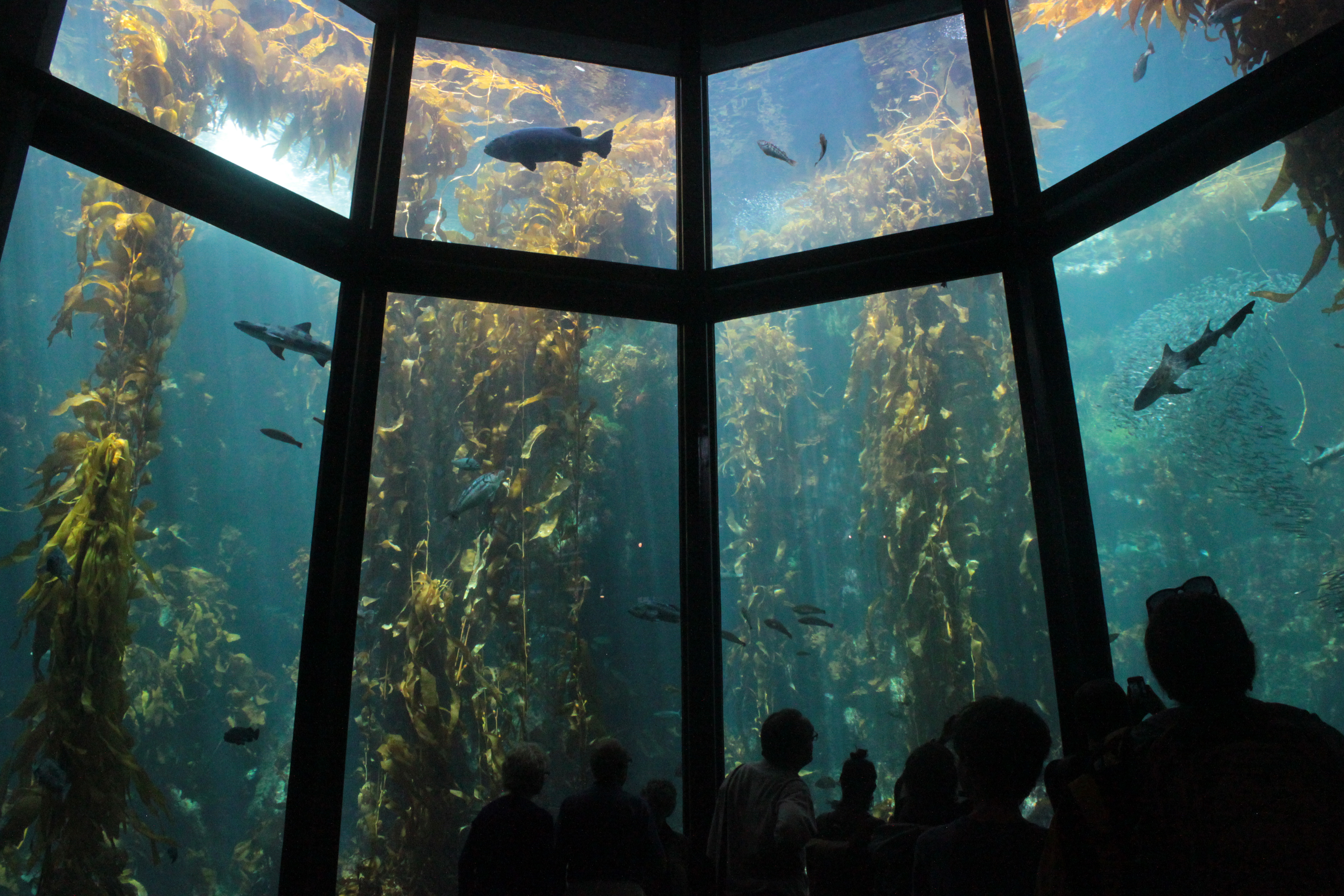
A 1,200,000-litre (320,000 US gal; 260,000 imp gal) aquarium at Monterey Bay Aquarium in California, displaying a kelp forest ecosystem

An aquarium can range from a small glass bowl containing less than 1 liter (0.26 U.S. gal) of water to immense public aquaria that house entire ecosystems such as kelp forests. Relatively large home aquaria resist rapid fluctuations of temperature and pH, allowing for greater system stability. Beginner aquarists are advised to consider larger tanks to begin with, as controlling water parameters in smaller tanks can prove difficult.

Small, unfiltered bowl-shaped aquaria are now widely regarded as unsuitable for most fish. In order to keep water conditions at suitable levels, aquariums should contain at least two forms of filtration: biological and mechanical. Chemical filtration should also be considered under some circumstances for optimum water quality. Chemical filtration is frequently achieved via activated carbon, to filter medications, tannins, and/or other known impurities from the water.

Reef aquaria under 100 litres (26 US gal; 22 imp gal) have a special place in the aquarium hobby; these aquaria, termed nano reefs (when used in reefkeeping), have a small water volume, under 40 litres (11 US gal; 9 imp gal).

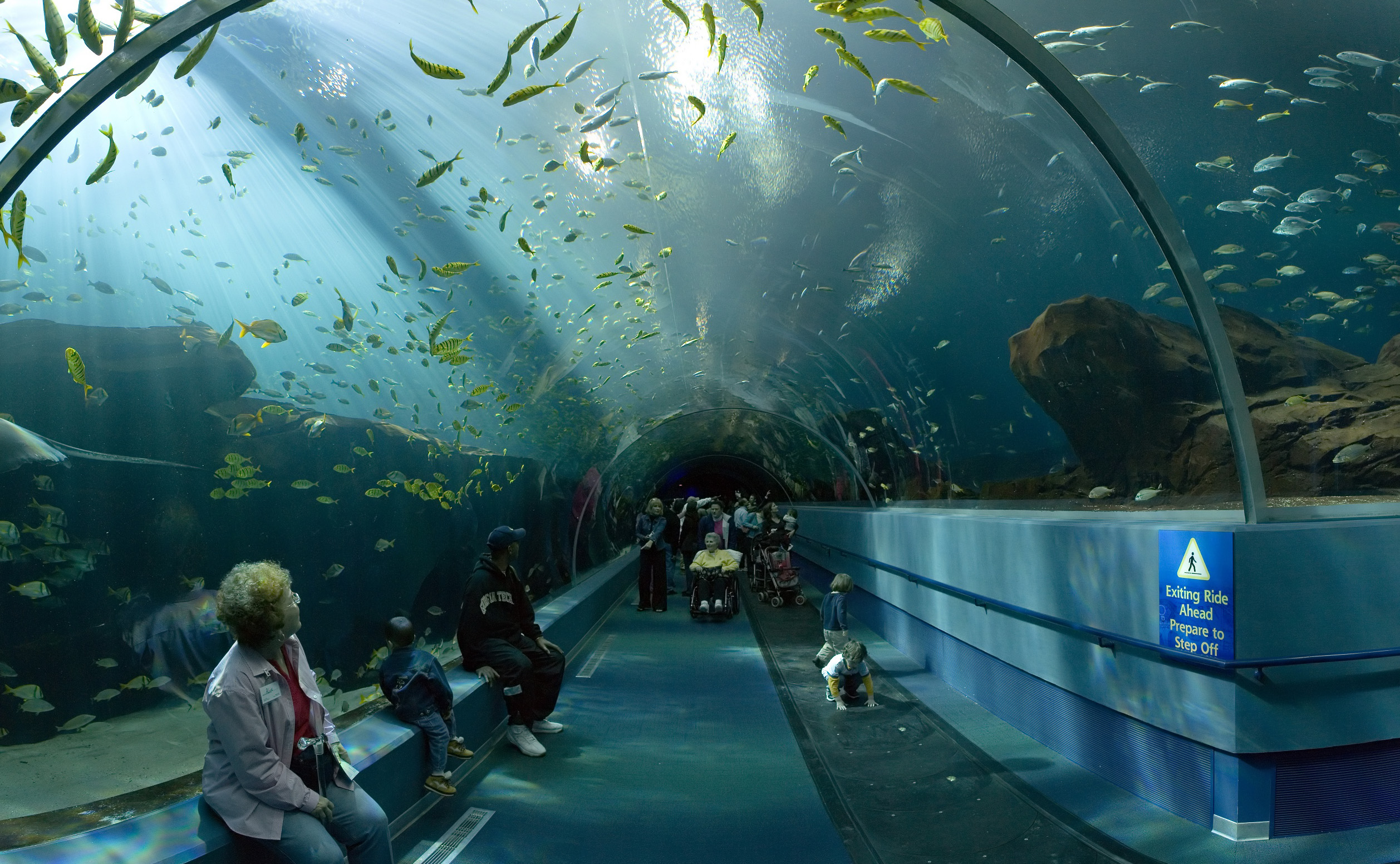
Tunnel at the Georgia Aquarium, USA

Practical limitations, most notably the weight of water (1 kilogram per litre (8.345 lb/U.S. gal; 10.022 lb/imp gal)) and internal water pressure (requiring thick glass siding) of a large aquarium, restrict most home aquaria to a maximum of around 1 cubic metre in volume (1000 L, weighing 1,000 kg or 2,200 lb). Some aquarists, however, have constructed aquaria of many thousands of litres.

Public aquariums and oceanariums designed for exhibition of large species or environments can be dramatically larger than any home aquarium. The Georgia Aquarium, for example, features an individual aquarium of 6,300,000 US gallons (24,000,000 L).

==== Nano aquariums ====
A new trend is to have very small aquariums, termed mini aquariums (less than 150 litres or 40 gallons) or nano aquariums (less than 75 litres or 20 gallons). These can be either freshwater or saltwater, and are intended to display a tiny but self-contained ecosystem.

== Components ==
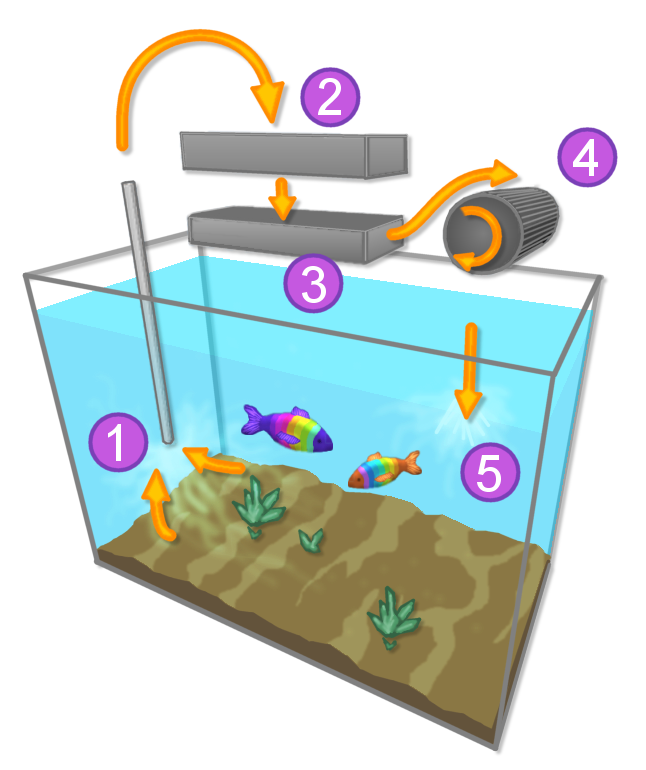
Filtration system in a typical aquarium: (1) intake, (2) mechanical filtration, (3) chemical filtration, (4) biological filtration medium, (5) outflow to tank

The typical hobbyist aquarium includes a filtration system, an artificial lighting system, an air diffuser and pump, and a heater or chiller depending on the aquarium's inhabitants. Many aquaria incorporate a hood, containing the lights, to decrease evaporation and prevent fish from leaving the aquarium (and anything else from entering the aquarium).

Combined biological and mechanical aquarium filtration systems are common. These either convert ammonia to nitrate (removing nitrogen at the expense of aquatic plants), or to sometimes remove phosphate. Filter media can house microbes that mediate nitrification. Filtration systems are sometimes the most complex component of home aquaria.

Aquarium heaters combine a heating element with a thermostat, allowing the aquarist to regulate water temperature at a level above that of the surrounding air, whereas coolers and chillers (refrigeration devices) are for use anywhere, such as cold water aquaria, where the ambient room temperature is above the desired tank temperature. Thermometers used include glass alcohol thermometers, adhesive external plastic strip thermometers, and battery-powered LCD thermometers. In addition, some aquarists use air pumps attached to airstones or water pumps to increase water circulation and supply adequate gas exchange at the water surface. Wave-making devices have also been constructed to provide wave action.

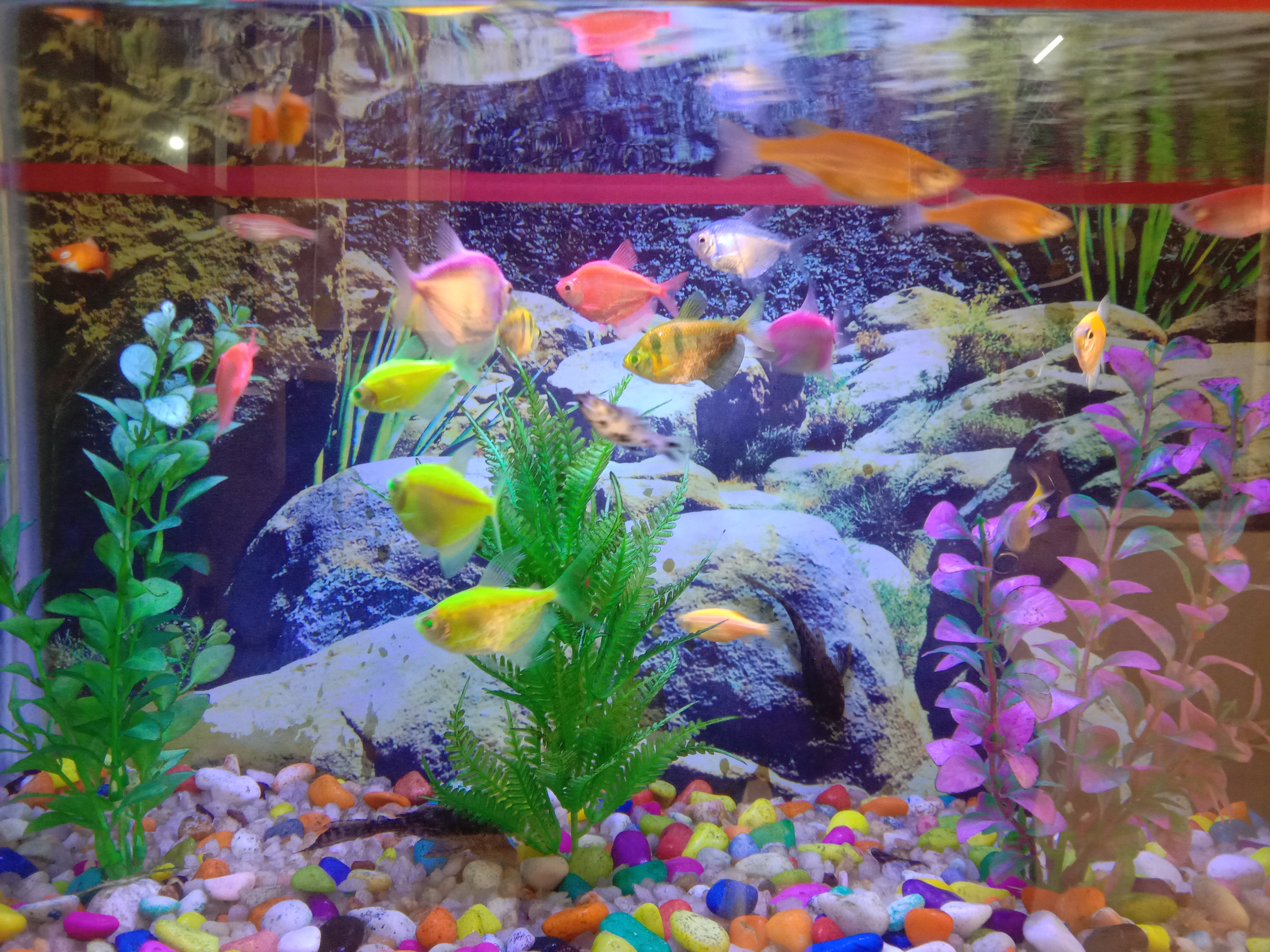
Fishes, multicolored pebbles and artificial plants within a home aquarium.

An aquarium's physical characteristics form another aspect of aquarium design. Size, lighting conditions, density of floating and rooted plants, placement of bog-wood, creation of caves or overhangs, type of substrate, and other factors (including an aquarium's positioning within a room) can all affect the behavior and survival of tank inhabitants.

An aquarium can be placed on an aquarium stand. Because of the weight of the aquarium, a stand must be strong as well as level. A tank that is not level may distort, leak, or crack. These are often built with cabinets to allow storage, available in many styles to match room decor. Simple metal tank stands are also available. Most aquaria should be placed on polystyrene to cushion any irregularities on the underlying surface or the bottom of the tank itself that may cause cracks. However, some tanks have an underframe making this unnecessary.

Another important consideration for aquariums is their electrical usage. Water is expensive to keep heated, along with the lights that many aquariums, especially those with live plants have. New aquarists should also pay close attention to their electrical setup for their aquarium, taking care to set up power connections with drip loops to prevent water from getting to outlets.

== Aquarium maintenance ==
Large volumes of water enable more stability in a tank by diluting effects from death or contamination events that push an aquarium away from equilibrium. The bigger the tank, the easier such a systemic shock is to absorb, because the effects of that event are diluted. For example, the death of the only fish in an 11-litre (3 US gal; 2 imp gal) tank causes dramatic changes in the system, while the death of that same fish in a 400-litre (110 US gal; 88 imp gal) tank with many other fish in it represents only a minor change. For this reason, hobbyists often favor larger tanks, as they require less attention.

Several nutrient cycles are important in the aquarium. Dissolved oxygen enters the system at the surface water-air interface. Similarly, carbon dioxide escapes the system into the air. The phosphate cycle is an important, although often overlooked, nutrient cycle. Sulfur, iron, and micronutrients also cycle through the system, entering as food and exiting as waste. Appropriate handling of the nitrogen cycle, along with supplying an adequately balanced food supply and considered biological loading, is enough to keep these other nutrient cycles in approximate equilibrium.

An aquarium must be maintained regularly to ensure that the fish are kept healthy. Daily maintenance consists of checking the fish for signs of stress and disease. Also, aquarists must make sure that the water has a good quality and it is not cloudy or foamy and the temperature of the water is appropriate for the particular species of fish that live in the aquarium.

Typical weekly maintenance includes changing around 10–30% or more of the water while cleaning the gravel, or other substrate if the aquarium has one; however some manage to avoid this entirely by keeping it somewhat self-sufficient. A good habit is to remove the water being replaced by "vacuuming" the gravel with suitable implements, as this will eliminate uneaten foods and other residues that settle on the substrate. In many areas tap water is not considered to be safe for fish to live in because it contains chemicals that harm the fish. Tap water from those areas must be treated with a suitable water conditioner, such as a product which removes chlorine and chloramine and neutralizes any heavy metals present. The water conditions must be checked both in the tank and in the replacement water, to make sure they are suitable for the species.

=== Water conditions ===
The solute content of water is perhaps the most important aspect of water conditions, as total dissolved solids and other constituents dramatically impact basic water chemistry, and therefore how organisms interact with their environment. Salt content, or salinity, is the most basic measure of water conditions. An aquarium may have freshwater (salinity below 500 parts per million), simulating a lake or river environment; brackish water (a salt level of 500 to 30,000 PPM), simulating environments lying between fresh and salt, such as estuaries; and salt water or seawater (a salt level of 30,000 to 40,000 PPM), simulating an ocean environment. Rarely, higher salt concentrations are maintained in specialized tanks for raising brine organisms.

Saltwater is usually alkaline, while the pH (alkalinity or acidity) of fresh water varies more. Hardness measures overall dissolved mineral content; hard or soft water may be preferred. Hard water is usually alkaline, while soft water is usually neutral to acidic. Dissolved organic content and dissolved gases content are also important factors.

Home aquarists typically use tap water supplied through their local water supply network to fill their tanks. Straight tap water cannot be used in localities that pipe chlorinated water. In the past, it was possible to "condition" the water by simply letting the water stand for a day or two, which allows the chlorine time to dissipate. However, chloramine is now used more often and does not leave the water as readily. Water conditioners formulated to remove chlorine or chloramine are often all that is needed to make the water ready for aquarium use. Brackish or saltwater aquaria require the addition of a commercially available mixture of salts and other minerals.

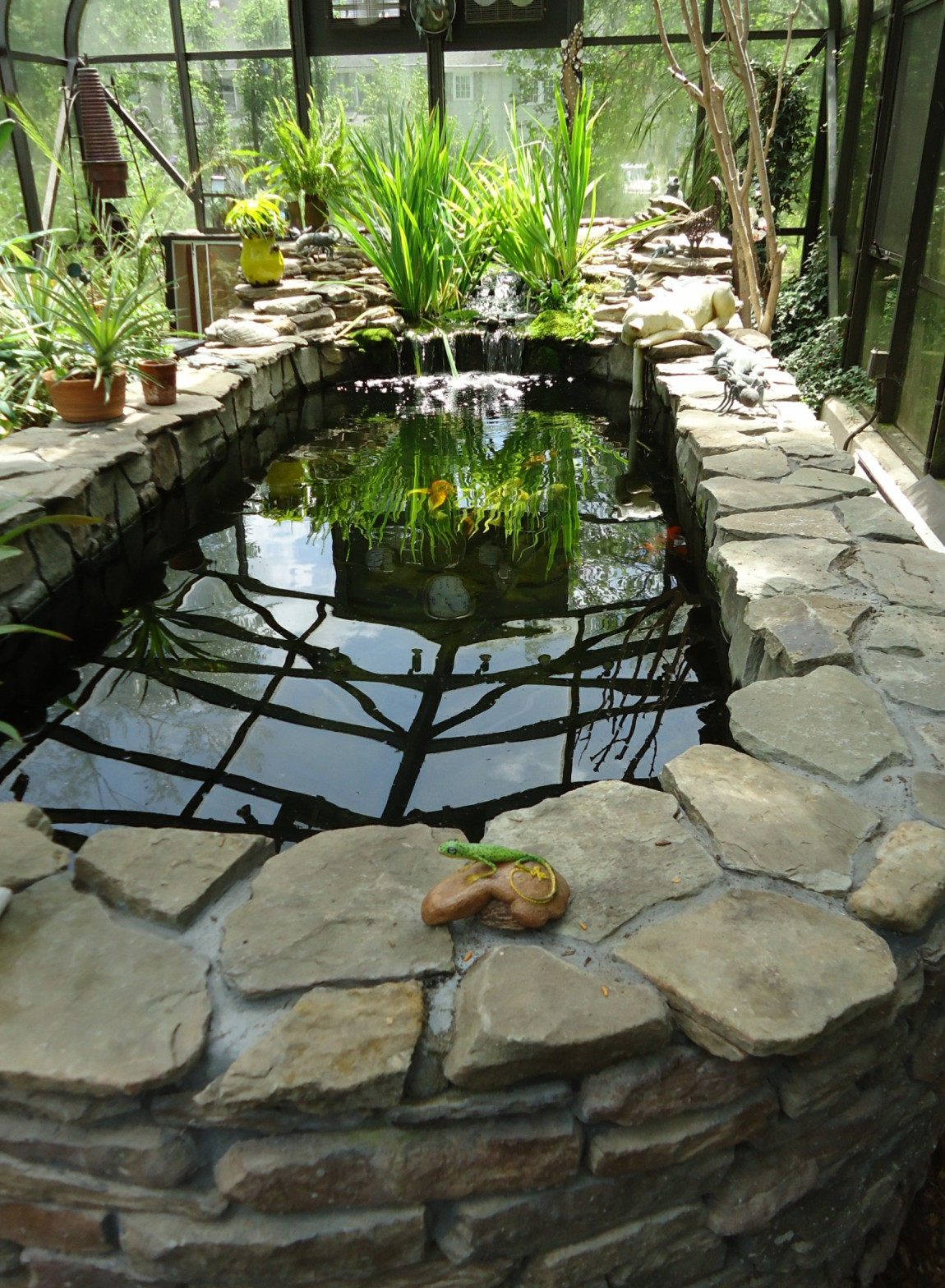
This aquarium features a heated tank and a glass-enclosed top for warmth during winter.

Some aquarists modify water's alkalinity, hardness, or dissolved content of organics and gases, before adding it to their aquaria. This can be accomplished by additives, such as sodium bicarbonate, to raise pH. Some aquarists filter or purify their water through deionization or reverse osmosis prior to using it. In contrast, public aquaria with large water needs often locate themselves near a natural water source (such as a river, lake, or ocean) to reduce the level of treatment. Some hobbyists use an algae scrubber to filter the water naturally.

Water temperature determines the two most basic aquarium classifications: tropical versus cold water. Most fish and plant species tolerate only a limited temperature range; tropical aquaria, with an average temperature of about 25 °C (77 °F), are much more common. Temperate or coldwater aquaria are for fish that are better suited to a cooler environment. Temperature consistency is more important than range. Most organisms are not accustomed to sudden changes in temperatures, which can cause shock and lead to disease. Water temperature can be regulated with a thermostat and heater (or cooler).

Water movement can also be important in simulating a natural ecosystem. Aquarists may prefer anything from still water up to swift currents, depending on the aquarium's inhabitants. Water movement can be controlled via aeration from air pumps, powerheads, and careful design of internal water flow (such as location of filtration system points of inflow and outflow).

=== Nitrogen cycle ===
The nitrogen cycle in an aquarium

Of primary concern to the aquarist is management of the waste produced by an aquarium's inhabitants. Fish, invertebrates, fungi, and some bacteria excrete nitrogen waste in the form of ammonia (which converts to ammonium, in water) and must then either pass through the nitrogen cycle or be removed by passing through zeolite. Ammonia is also produced through the decomposition of plant and animal matter, including fecal matter and other detritus. Nitrogen waste products become toxic to fish and other aquarium inhabitants at high concentrations. In the wild, the vast amount of water surrounding the fish dilutes ammonia and other waste materials. When fish are put into an aquarium, waste can quickly reach toxic concentrations in the enclosed environment unless the tank is cycled to remove waste.

==== The process ====
A well-balanced tank contains organisms that are able to metabolize the waste products of other aquarium residents, recreating a portion of the nitrogen cycle. Bacteria known as nitrifiers (genus Nitrosomonas) metabolize nitrogen waste. Nitrifying bacteria capture ammonia from the water and metabolize it to produce nitrite. Nitrite is toxic to fish in high concentrations. Another type of bacteria (genus Nitrospira) converts nitrite into nitrate, a less toxic substance. (Nitrobacter bacteria were previously believed to fill this role. While biologically they could theoretically fill the same niche as Nitrospira, it has recently been found that Nitrobacter are not present in detectable levels in established aquaria, while Nitrospira are plentiful.) However, commercial products sold as kits to "jump start" the nitrogen cycle often still contain Nitrobacter.

Aquatic plants also eliminate nitrogen waste by metabolizing ammonia and nitrate. When plants metabolize nitrogen compounds, they remove nitrogen from the water by using it to build biomass that decays more slowly than ammonia-driven plankton already dissolved in the water. Some hobbyists also use "anoxic filtration", which relies on bacteria that live in low-oxygen environments.

==== Maintaining the nitrogen cycle ====
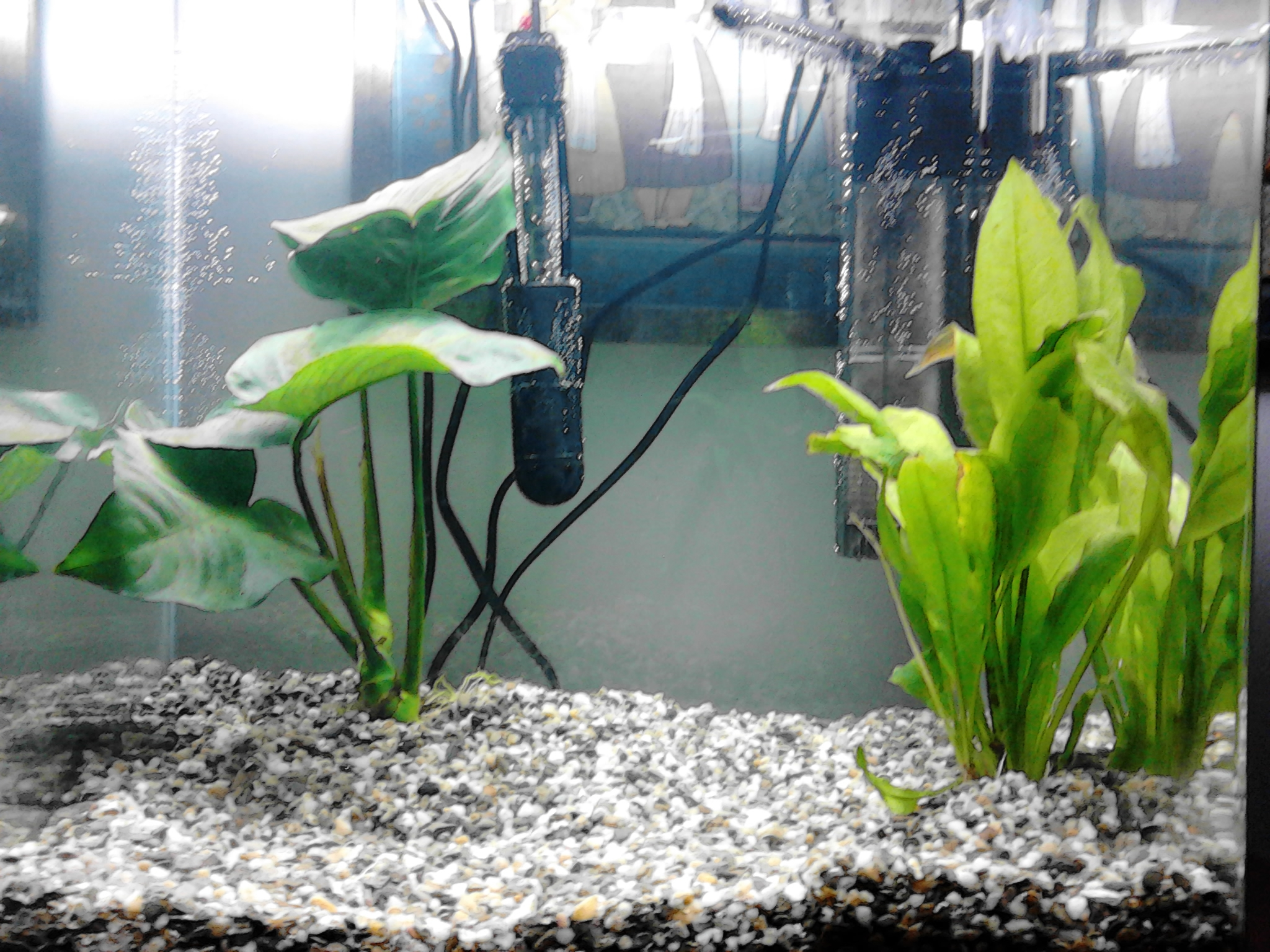
Live plants in an aquarium utilize the final product in the nitrogen cycle of nitrate as fertilizer, helping the nitrate levels stay minimal. This 60-litre (13 imp gal; 16 US gal) aquarium contains Anubias barteri and Echinodorus bleheri. A heater and small filter are in the background.

The nitrogen cycle in an aquarium is only a portion of the complete cycle: nitrogen must be added to the system (usually through food provided to the tank inhabitants), and nitrates accumulate in the water at the end of the process, or become bound in the biomass of plants. The aquarium keeper must remove water once nitrate concentrations grow, or remove plants which have grown from the nitrates.

Hobbyist aquaria often do not have sufficient bacteria populations to adequately denitrify waste. This problem is most often addressed through different filtration solutions: Activated carbon filters absorb nitrogen compounds and other toxins, while biological filters provide a medium designed to enhance bacterial colonization. Activated carbon and other substances, such as ammonia absorbing resins, stop working when their pores fill, so these components have to be replaced regularly. Mechanical solutions, often referred to as protein skimmers. These devices use a combination of high throughput pumps, mechanical agitation (impellers), and air stones to circulate the water column through the system while removing fish and/or coral waste products. These proteins typically form a high density foam that is the then captured in a trap that needs to be periodically cleaned by the aquarist. These systems can also enhance the dissolved oxygen levels in tanks.

New aquaria often have problems associated with the nitrogen cycle due to insufficient beneficial bacteria. Therefore, both fresh water and saltwater systems have to be matured before stocking them with fish or coral. There are three basic approaches to this: the "fishless cycle", the "silent cycle" and "slow growth". This is a common mistake made by beginner hobbyists who are excited to put livestock in their tanks on day one. When a tank is overstocked it can result in excess ammonia build-up, "nitrogen burn" , potentially leading to livestock death.

In a fishless cycle, small amounts of ammonia are added to an unpopulated tank to feed the bacteria. During this process, ammonia, nitrite, and nitrate levels are tested to monitor progress. The "silent" cycle is basically nothing more than densely stocking the aquarium with fast-growing aquatic plants and relying on them to consume the nitrogen, allowing the necessary bacterial populations time to develop. According to anecdotal reports, the plants can consume nitrogenous waste so efficiently that ammonia and nitrite level spikes seen in more traditional cycling methods are greatly reduced or disappear. "Slow growth" entails slowly increasing the population of fish over a period of 6 to 8 weeks, giving bacteria colonies time to grow and stabilize with the increase in fish waste. This method is usually done with a small starter population of hardier fish which can survive the ammonia and nitrite spikes, whether they are intended to be permanent residents or to be traded out later for the desired occupants.

The largest bacterial populations are found in the filter, where there is high water flow and plentiful surface available for their growth, so effective and efficient filtration is vital. Sometimes, a vigorous cleaning of the filter is enough to seriously disturb the biological balance of an aquarium. Therefore, it is recommended to rinse mechanical filters in an outside bucket of aquarium water to dislodge organic materials that contribute to nitrate problems, while preserving bacteria populations. Another safe practice consists of cleaning only half of the filter media during each service, or using two filters, only one of which is cleaned at a time.

=== Biological load ===
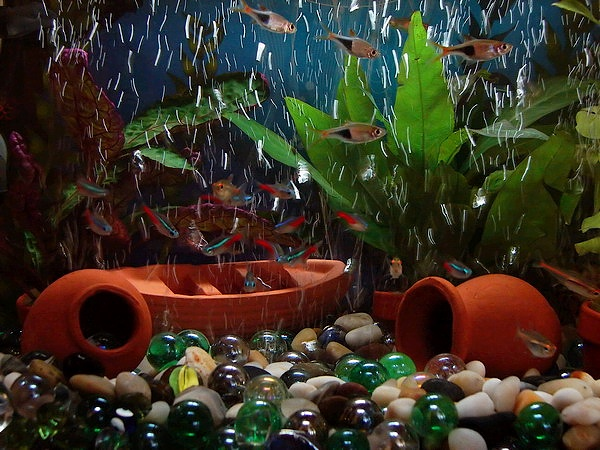
A very heavily stocked 19-liter aquarium containing Paracheirodon innesi, Trigonostigma heteromorpha, and Hemigrammus erythrozonus

The biological load, or bioload is a measure of the burden placed on the aquarium ecosystem by its inhabitants. High biological loading presents a more complicated tank ecology, which in turn means that equilibrium is easier to upset. Several fundamental constraints on biological loading depend on aquarium size. The water's surface area limits oxygen intake. The bacteria population depends on the physical space they have available to colonize. Physically, only a limited size and number of plants and animals can fit into an aquarium while still providing room for movement. Biologically, biological loading refers to the rate of biological decay in proportion to tank volume. Adding plants to an aquarium will sometimes help greatly with taking up fish waste as plant nutrients. Although an aquarium can be overloaded with fish, an excess of plants is unlikely to cause harm. Decaying plant material, such as decaying plant leaves, can add these nutrients back into the aquarium if not promptly removed. The bioload is processed by the aquarium's biofilter filtration system.

==== Calculating capacity ====
Limiting factors include the oxygen availability and filtration processing. Aquarists have rules of thumb to estimate the number of fish that can be kept in an aquarium. The examples below are for small freshwater fish; larger freshwater fishes and most marine fishes need much more generous allowances.

- 3 cm of adult fish length per 4 litres of water (i.e., a 6 cm-long fish would need about 8 litres of water).
- 1 cm of adult fish length per 30 square centimetres of surface area.
- 1 inch of adult fish length per US gallon of water.
- 1 inch of adult fish length per 12 square inches of surface area.

Experienced aquarists warn against applying these rules too strictly because they do not consider other important issues such as growth rate, activity level, social behaviour, filtration capacity, total biomass of plant life, and so on. It is better to apply the overall mass and size of a fish per gallon of water, than simply the length. This is because fish of different sizes produce quite differing amounts of waste. Establishing maximum capacity is often a matter of slowly adding fish and monitoring water quality over time, following a trial and error approach.

==== Other factors affecting capacity ====
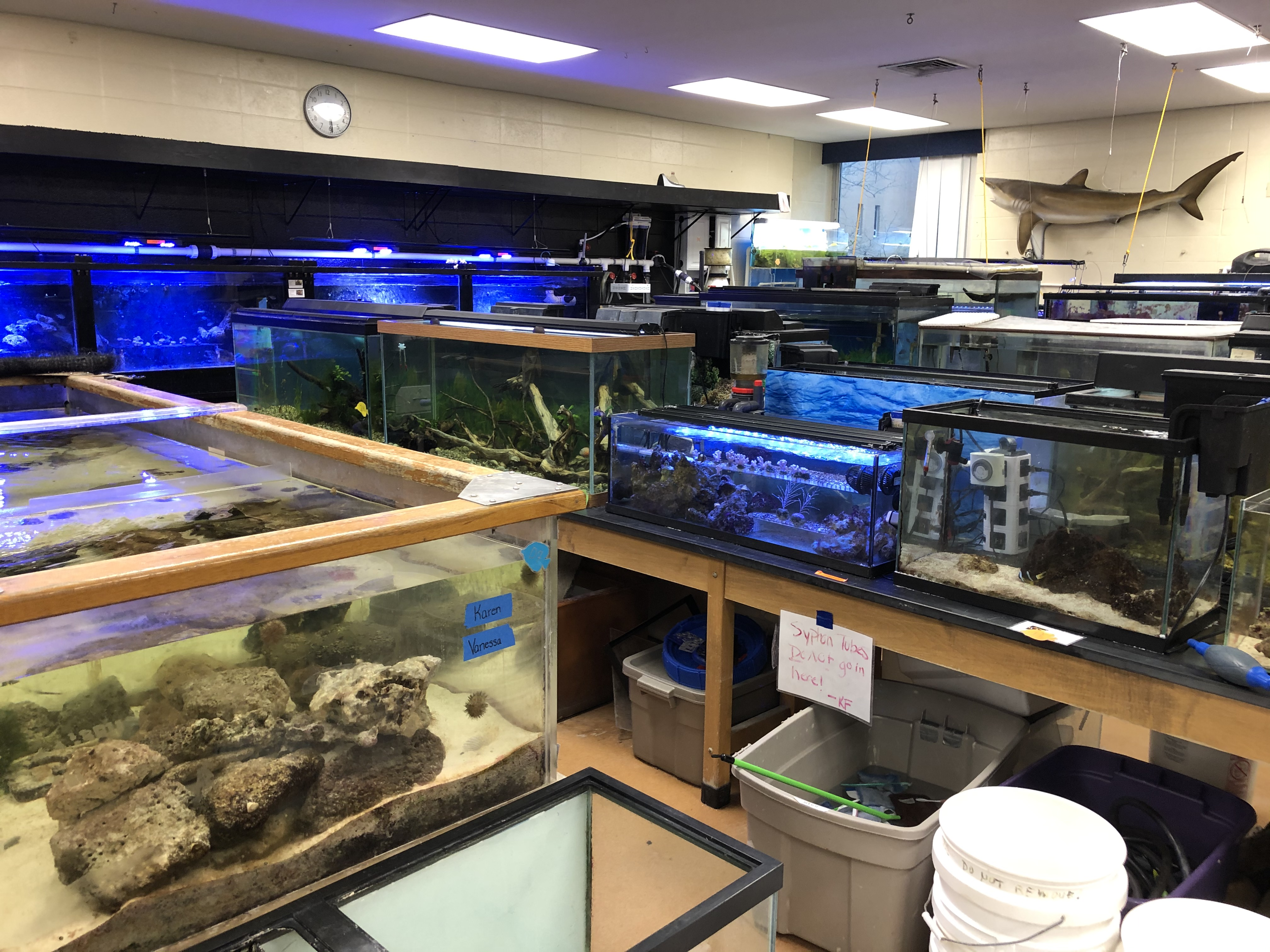
An academic aquarium at a university, using a variety of tank sizes and styles to care for different fish.

One variable is differences between fish. Smaller fish consume more oxygen per gram of body weight than larger fish. Labyrinth fish can breathe atmospheric oxygen and do not need as much surface area (however, some of these fish are territorial, and do not appreciate crowding). Barbs also require more surface area than tetras of comparable size.

Oxygen exchange at the surface is an important constraint, and thus the surface area of the aquarium matters. Some aquarists claim that a deeper aquarium holds no more fish than a shallower aquarium with the same surface area. The capacity can be improved by surface movement and water circulation such as through aeration, which not only improves oxygen exchange, but also waste decomposition rates.

Waste density is another variable. Decomposition in solution consumes oxygen. Oxygen dissolves less readily in warmer water; this is a double-edged sword since warmer temperatures make fish more active, so they consume more oxygen.

In addition to bioload/chemical considerations, aquarists also consider the mutual compatibility of the fish. For instance, predatory fish are usually not kept with small, passive species, and territorial fish are often unsuitable tankmates for shoaling species. Furthermore, fish tend to fare better if given tanks conducive to their size. That is, large fish need large tanks and small fish can do well in smaller tanks. Lastly, the tank can become overcrowded without being overstocked. In other words, the aquarium can be suitable with regard to filtration capacity, oxygen load, and water, yet still be so crowded that the inhabitants are uncomfortable.

For planted freshwater aquariums, it is also important to maintain a balance between the duration and quality of light, the amount of plants, CO_{2} levels and nutrients. Light exposure within the tank environment can also influence nutrient concentrations. For a given amount of light, if there is insufficient number of plants or insufficient CO_{2} to support the growth of those plants, so as to consume all the nutrients in the tank, the result would be algae growth. While there are fishes and invertebrates that could be introduced in the tank to clean up this algae, the ideal solution would be to find the optimal balance between the above-mentioned factors. Supplemental CO_{2} can be provided, whose quantity has to be carefully regulated, as too much CO_{2} may harm the fishes.

== Aquarium classifications ==
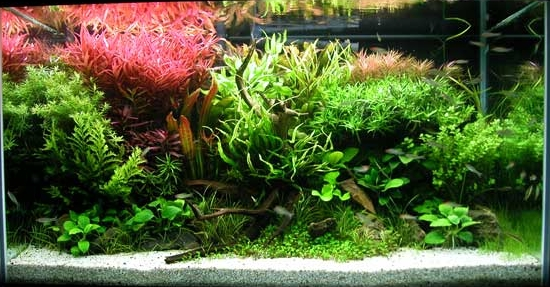
An aquascaped freshwater aquarium

From the outdoor ponds and glass jars of antiquity, modern aquaria have evolved into a wide range of specialized systems. Individual aquaria can vary in size from a small bowl large enough for only a single small fish, to the huge public aquaria that can simulate entire marine ecosystems.

One way to classify aquaria is by salinity. Freshwater aquaria are the most popular due to their lower cost. More expensive and complex equipment is required to set up and maintain marine aquaria. Marine aquaria frequently feature a diverse range of invertebrates in addition to species of fish. Brackish water aquaria combine elements of both marine and freshwater fishkeeping. Fish kept in brackish water aquaria generally come from habitats with varying salinity, such as mangrove swamps and estuaries. Subtypes exist within these types, such as the reef aquarium, a typically smaller marine aquarium that houses coral.

Another classification is by temperature range. Many aquarists choose a tropical aquarium because tropical fish tend to be more colorful. However, the coldwater aquarium is also popular, which includes fish from temperate areas worldwide.

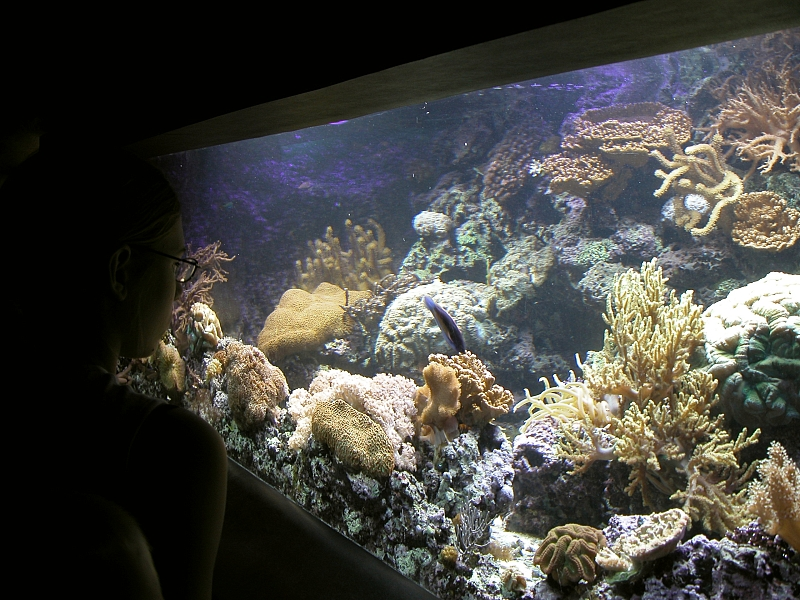
A saltwater aquarium

Aquaria may be grouped by their species selection. In a community tank, several non-aggressive species live peacefully. In these aquaria, the fish, invertebrates, and plants probably do not originate from the same geographic region, but tolerate similar water conditions and each other. Aggressive tanks, by contrast, house a limited number of species that can be aggressive toward other fish, or are able to withstand aggression well. Most aquarists maintaining marine tanks and tanks housing cichlids have to take species aggressiveness into account when stocking. Specimen tanks usually only house one fish species, along with plants—sometimes those found in the fish species' natural environment—and decorations simulating a natural ecosystem. This type is useful for fish that cannot coexist with other fish, such as the electric eel, as an extreme example. Some tanks of this sort are used simply to house adults for breeding.

Biotope aquaria is another type based on species selection. In it, an aquarist attempts to simulate a specific natural ecosystem, assembling fish, invertebrate species, plants, decorations and water conditions all found in that ecosystem. Public aquaria often use this approach. Biotope aquaria simulates the experience of observing in the wild. It typically serves as the healthiest possible artificial environment for the tank's occupants.

== Public aquaria ==
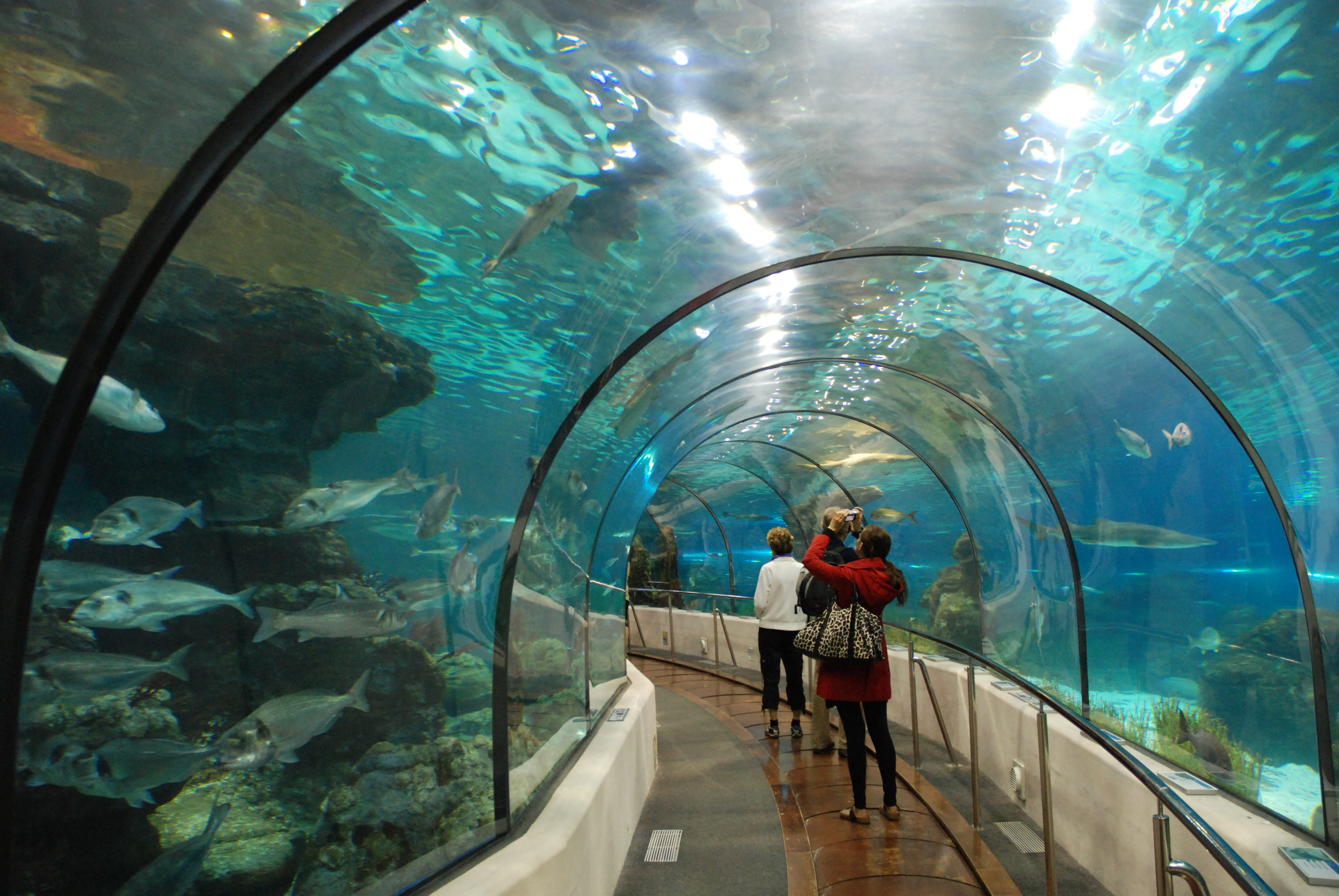
The 80-meter (260 ft) underwater tunnel in Aquarium Barcelona

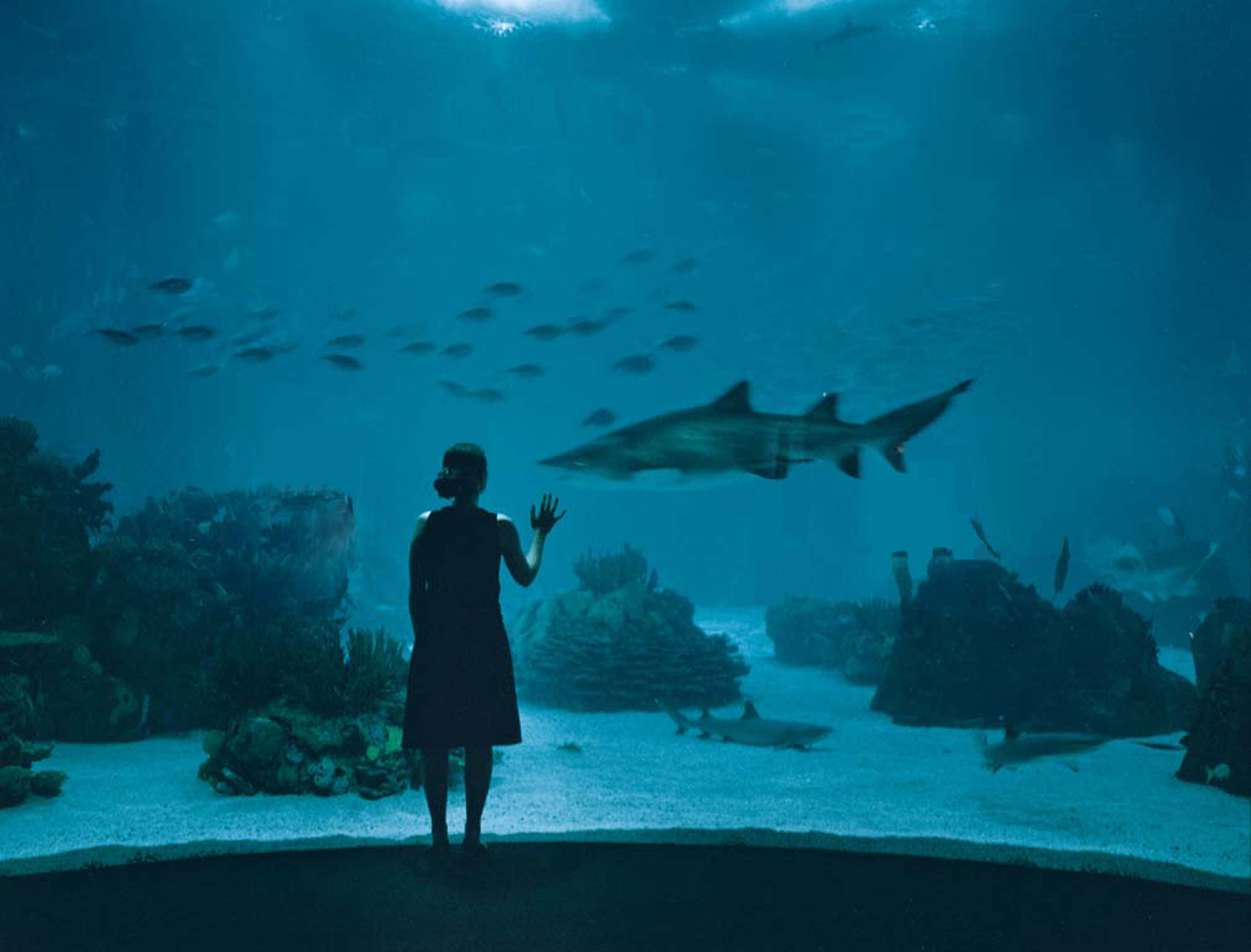
Lisbon Oceanarium designed by architect Peter Chermayeff

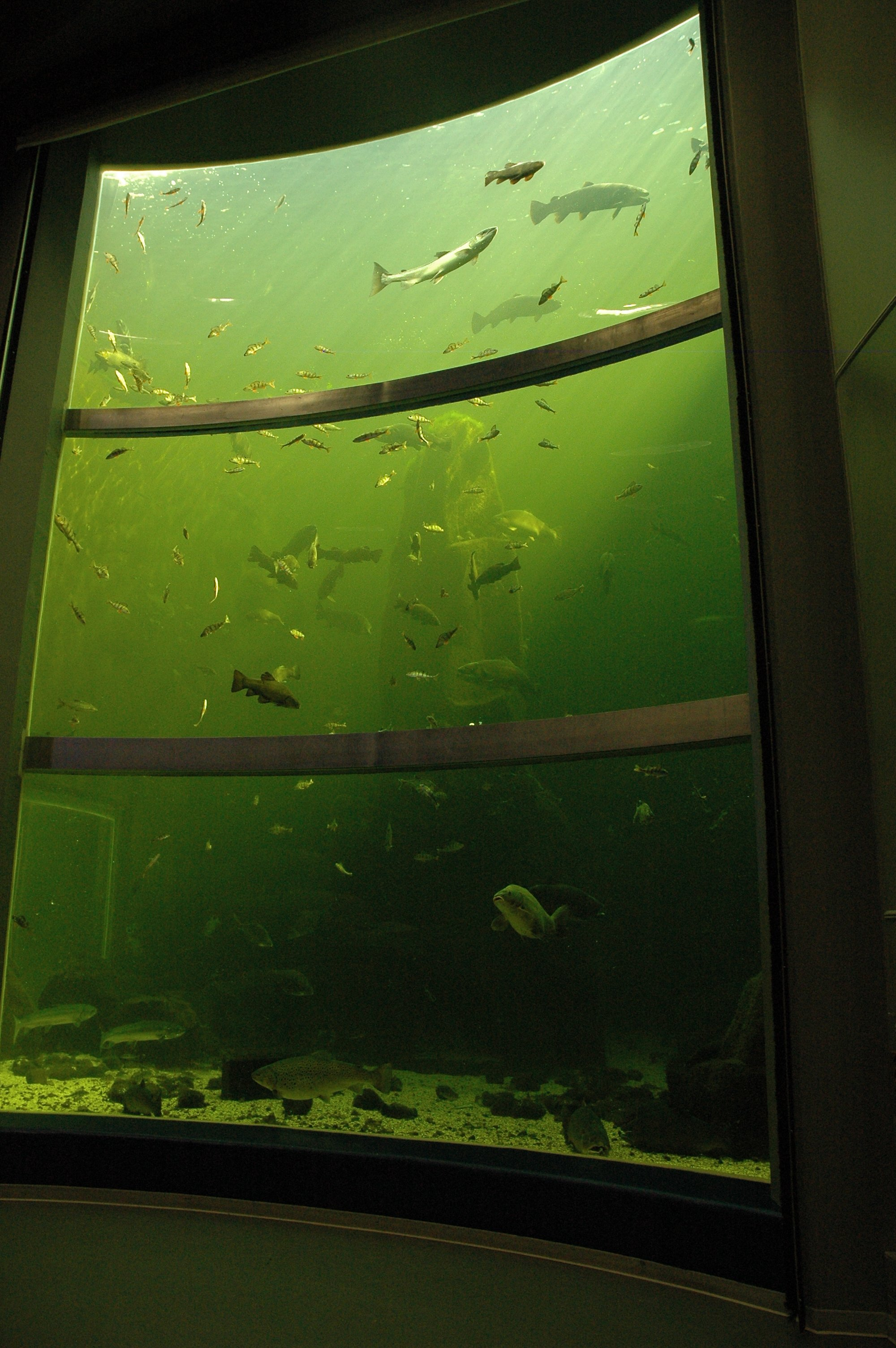
The Baltic Sea Aquarium at the Maretarium in Kotka, Finland

Most public aquarium facilities feature a number of smaller aquaria, as well as those too large for home aquarists. The largest tanks hold millions of gallons of water and can house large species, including sharks or beluga whales, which typically could not be housed properly in the home aquarium. Dolphinaria are specifically for dolphins. Aquatic and semiaquatic animals, including otters and penguins, may also be kept by public aquaria. Public aquaria may also be included in larger establishments such as a marine mammal park or a marine park. These are very popular around the world, especially with a new emergence in the Middle East.

== Virtual aquariums ==
A virtual aquarium is a computer program which uses 3D graphics to reproduce an aquarium on a personal computer. The swimming fish are rendered in real time, while the background of the tank is usually static. Objects on the floor of the tank may be mapped in simple planes so that the fish may appear to swim both in front and behind them, but a relatively simple 3D map of the general shape of such objects may be used to allow the light and ripples on the surface of the water to cast realistic shadows. Bubbles and water noises are common for virtual aquariums, which are often used as screensavers.

The number of each type of fish can usually be selected, often including other animals like starfish, jellyfish, seahorses, and even sea turtles. Most companies that produce virtual aquarium software also offer other types of fish for sale via Internet download. Other objects found in an aquarium can also be added and rearranged on some software, like treasure chests and giant clams that open and close with air bubbles, or a bobbing diver. There are also usually features that allow the user to tap on the glass or put food in the top, both of which the fish will react to. Some also have the ability to allow the user to edit fish and other objects to create new varieties.

== See also ==
- List of aquaria
- Association of Zoos and Aquariums (AZA)
- List of aquarium diseases
- List of aquarium fish by scientific name
- List of brackish aquarium fish species
- List of brackish aquarium plant species
- List of freshwater aquarium amphibian species
- List of freshwater aquarium fish species
- List of freshwater aquarium invertebrate species
- List of freshwater aquarium plant species
- List of marine aquarium fish species
- List of marine aquarium invertebrate species
- List of marine aquarium plant species
- Vivarium
