= Nano aquarium =

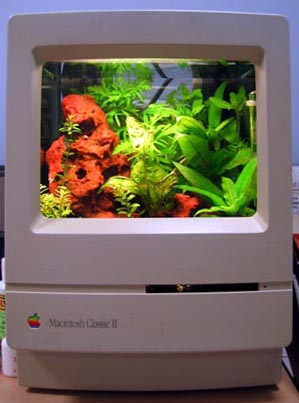
A Macquarium, a type of nano aquarium built inside the shell of an Apple Macintosh computer

Nano aquariums are aquariums with the emphasis on small scale inhabitants inside smaller sized aquariums. They can be either freshwater nano aquariums or saltwater nano aquariums. Nano fish species are chosen from any smaller sized species of tropical fish. Other possible inhabitants are freshwater and seawater shrimps. Any plants for a nano aquarium also have to be of the smaller species.

The marine nano aquarium is more difficult to maintain than the nano freshwater aquarium.

== See also ==
- Nano reefs
