= Macquarium =

Macintosh computer turned into a nano aquarium

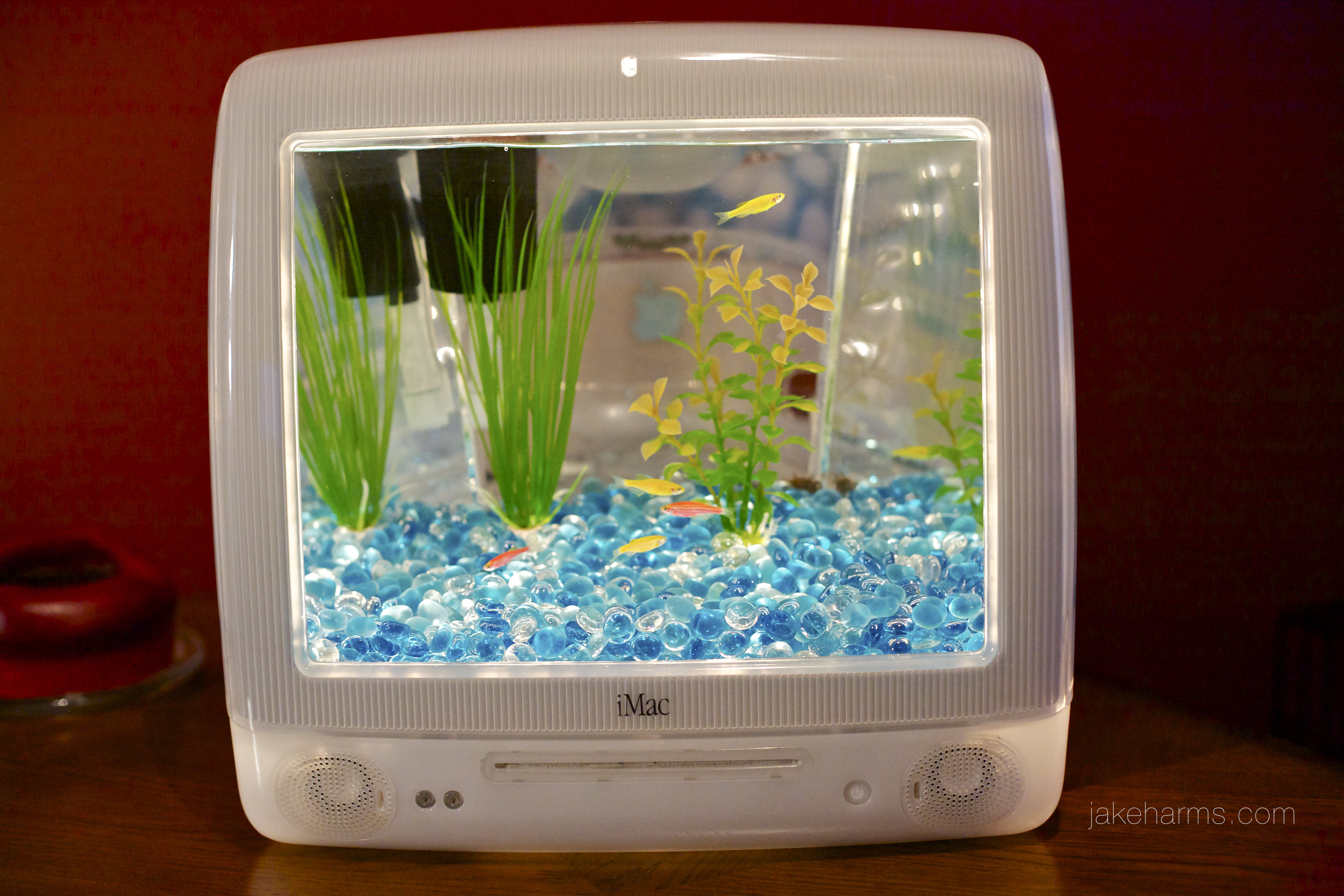
An iMacquarium

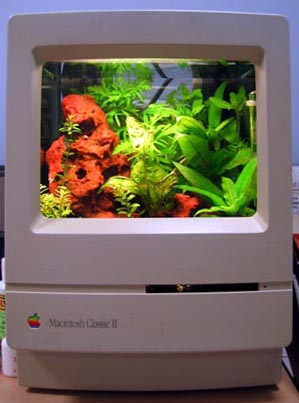
A Macquarium made from a Macintosh Classic II

A Macquarium is an aquarium made from, or made to sit within, the shell of an Apple Macintosh computer. The term was coined by computer writer Andy Ihnatko as a joke at the outdated Macintosh 512K; Macquariums have since been built both by Ihnatko himself and by others.

== History ==
In the early 1990s, a user wrote into MacUser's help column asking how best to upgrade a Macintosh 512K. Columnist Andy Ihnatko jokingly responded that it should be turned into a fishtank. This resulted in eleven reader letters inquiring how to actually do it, leading Ihnatko to test it for himself.

Ihnatko originally designed his Macquarium to use the Compact Macintosh-style shell. In the early 1990s, several Mac models in this form factor (such as the Macintosh 128K, Macintosh 512K and Macintosh Plus) were becoming obsolete, and Ihnatko considered that turning one into an aquarium might be "the final upgrade", as well as an affordable way to have a color Compact Mac. Ihnatko has mentioned in interviews that he saw attempts to build Macintosh aquariums at trade shows that, among other drawbacks, suffered from noticeable water level lines across the "screen" that spoiled the illusion of a "really good screensaver". This drove him to design a version without a visible water line, and which allowed the external case of the donor Mac to remain intact.

Ihnatko's slant-front tank design, made of glass, had a nominal capacity of approximately 10 liters (2.2 UK gallons or 2.5 US gallons). Some subsequent designs have utilized acrylic glass or lexan. Because of its small capacity relative to most other aquariums, the Macquarium is considered a form of nano aquarium, which requires a higher level of diligence to maintain proper water chemistry and cleanliness. The parts for some of Ihnatko's Macquariums were constructed with parts from two sources located near Apple's headquarters in Cupertino, California. For these aquariums, Ihnatko used the case of the Macintosh as the tank and sealed the screen and vent holes to be watertight.

In 1992, Ihnatko published a guide, The Original Macquarium, on how to build and maintain one. A year later, Ihnatko and his Macquarium were featured in an episode of the cable program Mac Today, in which Bob LeVitus interviewed Ihnatko. In 2001, Ihnatko released an updated version of his guide for the iMac. It was later reported that both Apple co-founder Steve Jobs and talk show host Jay Leno had iMacquariums.

== Construction ==
Macquariums are often stocked with 2–3 goldfish, which do not require tank heaters and are cheap. However, because goldfish grow large, have high oxygen requirements, and are messy eaters, they require much larger tanks for long-term survival. As such, Siamese fighting fish and small shrimp are better options for Macquariums.

Other Mac models have similarly been turned into aquariums, such as the Macintosh TV, the Apple Lisa, and the Power Mac G4 Cube. Various iMac models, such as the iMac G3, have been used to make "iMacquariums". By 1995, a Macquarium based on a Macintosh LC 575 appeared in a Macintosh magazine titled "Macquarium '95".
