= Systemic shock =

A systemic shock is a shock to any system that perturbs a system enough to drive it out of equilibrium. Systemic shocks occur in a wide range of fields, ranging from medicine (see shock), ecology, economics to engineering. Designers of systems usually desire their systems to be able to withstand or recover from foreseeable system shocks; therefore, many systems are designed with mechanisms in place to restore an equilibrium state.

== See also ==
- Shock (circulatory)
- Shock (economics)
