= List of brackish aquarium plant species =

Aquatic plants are used to give the aquarium a natural appearance, oxygenate the water, and provide habitat for fish, especially fry (babies) and for invertebrates. Some aquarium fish and invertebrates also eat live plants. Hobby aquarists use aquatic plants for aquascaping.

Brackish plants are known to occur in brackish water.

== Listed alphabetically by scientific name ==
The taxonomy of most plant genera is not final.

- Alternanthera reineckii
- Bacopa monnieri
- Caloglossa beccarii
- Crassula aquatica
- Cryptocoryne ciliata
- Cymodocea nodosa
- Helanthium tenellum
- Juncus roemerianus
- Myriophyllum spicatum
- Najas marina
- Sagittaria spp.
- Spartina alterniflora
- Vallisneria spp.
- Zostera marina
- Zostera noltii

=== Mangroves ===
- Black mangrove, Avicennia germinans
- Red mangrove, Rhizophora mangle
- White mangrove, both Avicennia marina and Laguncularia racemosa
