= Aquarium fish clubs =

Social associations for fishkeepers

Aquarium fish clubs or aquarium societies are social rather than academic associations for fishkeepers. They are to be found around the world. Some clubs include members in all the different aspects of the hobby, while others concentrate on one particular field, such as cichlids or marine fishkeeping. The first aquarium society ever formed was the Gotha Aquarium in Germany, founded in 1882. The oldest continuous aquarium club still in existence is the Boston Aquarium Society, founded in 1916. A Brooklyn Aquarium Society in New York City founded in 1911, but disbanded mid-century, and later reformed in the 1950s with the same name.

There are several umbrella organizations for the organised hobby: The International Federation of Online Clubs and Aquatic Societies (IFOCAS), the Federation of British Aquatic Societies, formed in 1932 (FBAS), The Northeast Council of Aquarium Societies, formed in 1958 (NEC), and The Federation of American Aquarium Societies (FAAS).

Many clubs hold fish shows similar to dog shows where fish are judged and awarded prizes based on color, size, etc. Some clubs also hold auctions where fish, plants, equipment, and books are sold, usually inexpensively, in some cases giving members the chance to obtain to rare and unusual species that have been bred by other members of the club. Internet forums are an important aspect of many clubs, allowing members to easily share information and experiences.
