= The Maryland Zoo in Baltimore =

Zoo in Baltimore, Maryland, U.S.

Maryland Zoo
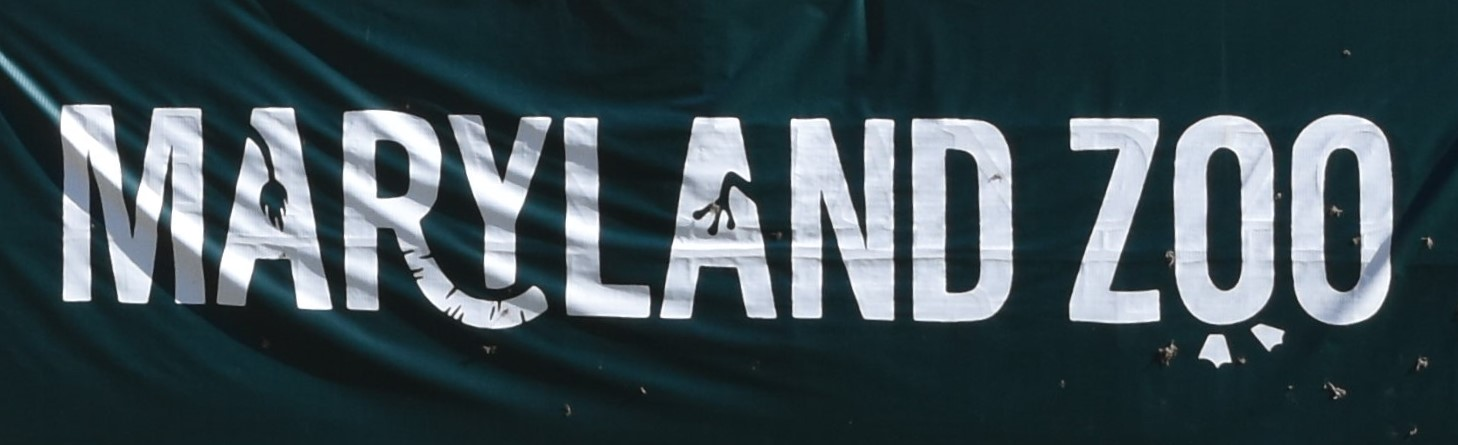

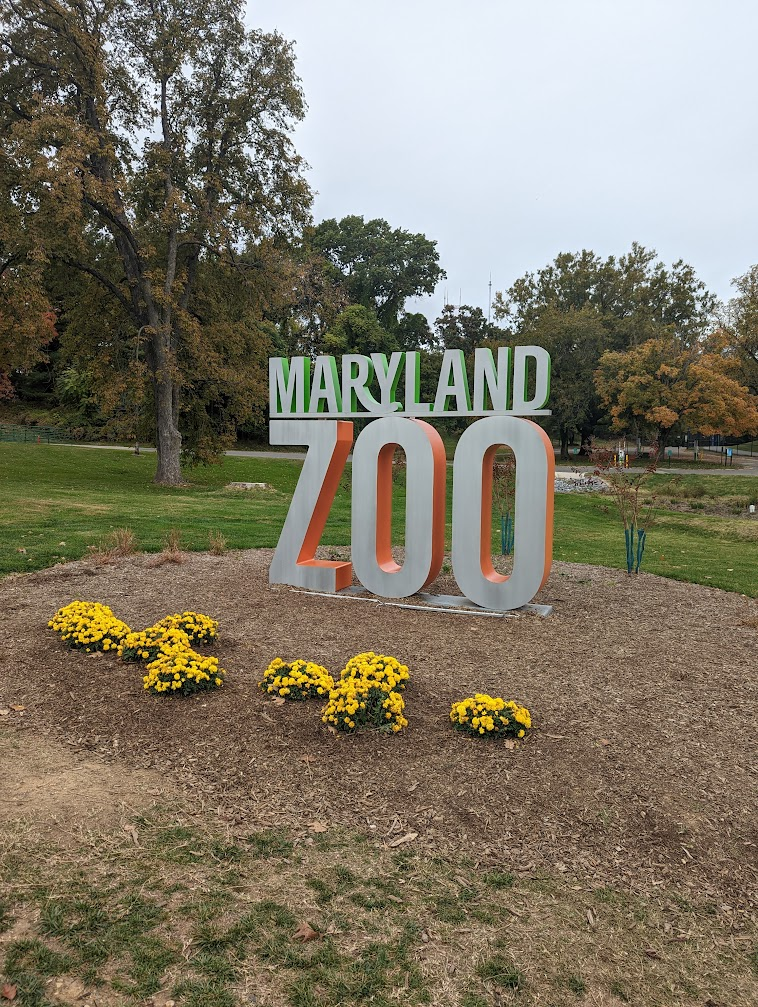
- Entrance sign
- Interactive map of Maryland Zoo
- 39°19′24″N 76°38′58″W
- Date opened: 1876; 150 years ago
- Location: Safari Place, Druid Hill Park, 1876 Mansion House Drive; Baltimore, Maryland 21217 United States
- Land area: 135 acres (55 ha)
- No. of animals: 1,500
- No. of species: 200
- Annual visitors: 500,000
- Memberships: AZA
- Major exhibits: African Journey, Northern Passage, Maryland Wilderness
- Public transit: at Mondawmin at Woodberry; BaltimoreLink routes 21, 22, 38, 82, 83, 85, 91
- Website: www.marylandzoo.org

The Maryland Zoo—also known as The Maryland Zoo in Baltimore and formerly as The Baltimore City Zoo or the Baltimore Zoo—is a 135-acre (0.55 km^{2}) park located in historic Druid Hill Park in the northwestern area of the City of Baltimore, Maryland, with the postal address of 1876 Mansion House Drive. Druid Hill was opened in 1876 as the first major park purchase by the City under Mayor Thomas Swann (1809-1883), (and later as 33rd Governor of Maryland, 1866-1869) and was later designed by famed nationally-known landscaper Frederick Law Olmsted (1822-1903).

Additional work on various park buildings was contributed by future Baltimore City Hall architect George A. Frederick (1842-1924), and Park Commissioner John H.B. Latrobe (son of earlier famed British-American architect Benjamin Henry Latrobe (1764-1820), who also was an accomplished lawyer, author, artist, amateur architect and civic leader. Olmsted had earlier won a contest for the design of plans for New York City's famed Central Park in mid-town Manhattan in 1858, a year after it opened, and worked on the massive public works project during its construction from 1858 to 1873. The Maryland Zoo is now currently home to over 1,500 animals and is accredited by the Association of Zoos and Aquariums (AZA).

== History ==
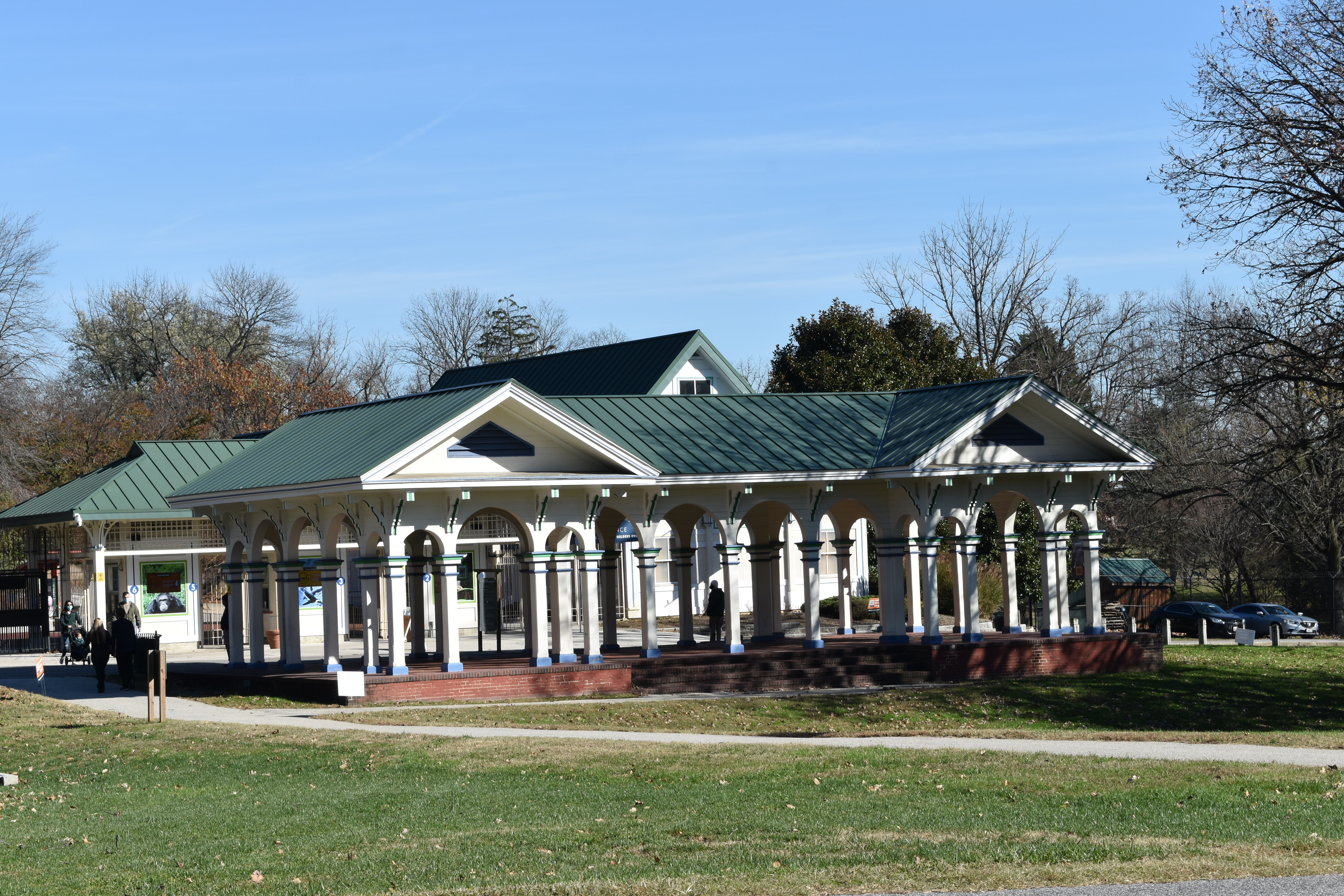
Council Grove Pavilion outside the zoo's entrance

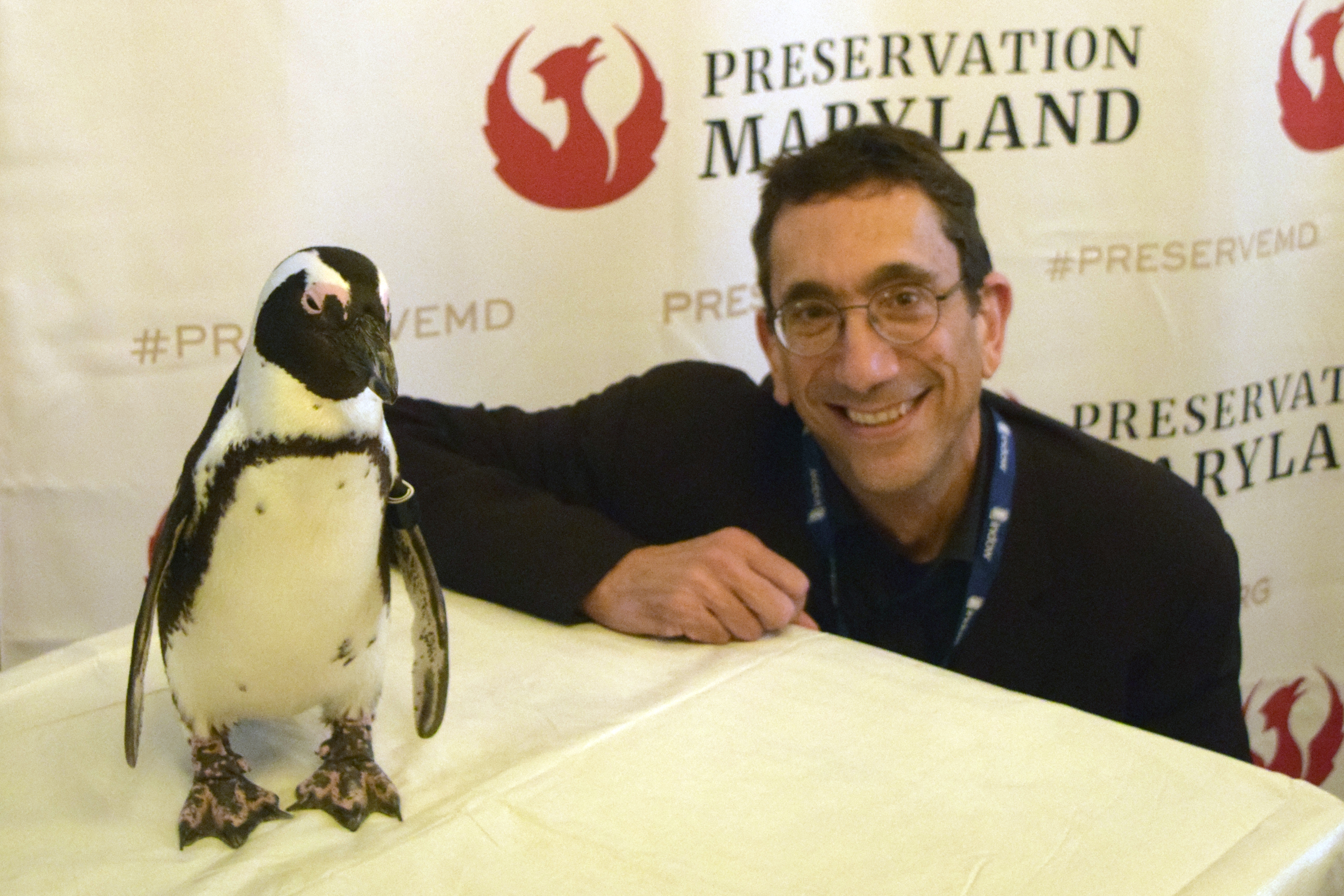
An African penguin at the Six-to-Fix Gala 2016 event. Many events are held at the Mansion House at the zoo.

The Maryland Zoo in Baltimore is generally considered to be the third oldest (or by some other circumstances, the second oldest) zoological park in the United States, having opened in 1876, sixteen years after the historic Park itself was purchased and opened to the city public. Henry Bishop (1837-1907), an animal dealer in the city known as the "Bird Man", was once called the "Father of the Baltimore Zoo". He worked to establish a zoological garden in Druid Hill Park, donating many animals to form the nucleus of the collection that became the zoo.

For a number of decades in the 20th century, it was operated and supervised by the Baltimore City Board of Park Commissioners, and organized in 1860 with the first major city park at Druid Hill and later the city Department of Parks and Recreation, through their subordinate Bureau of the Zoo. It was later assisted by the organization of a group of supportive friends, animal and wildlife lovers in the Baltimore City Zoological Society, which performed a saving function in the late 1960s when changing demographic and historical populations in the surrounding communities around Druid Hill Park resulted in increased crime and some harassment incidents to the animal population, resulting in a few deaths and maimings, resulted in a protective fence being erected around the zoo campus, and entrance ticketing center and gates which previously had been open to the surrounding Park.

In later decades, by 2004, a course of action between the City and the Society resulted in a semi-private and new independent operation arrangement with a separate board of trustees for the Zoo with increased private, state and suburban counties funding to supplement the restricting resources of the central City. This also resulted in a renaming of the old City Zoo as "The Maryland Zoo in Baltimore."

From the 1950s to the 1970s, the City Zoo was made famous locally through the media-savvy and through the new medium of television with programs and promotions of Dr. Arthur Watson, the long-time zoo director. In 1980, when the famous iconic "Harborplace" festival marketplace pavilions at the Inner Harbor by developer James Rouse, opened by downtown Baltimore's waterfront business district and its Patapsco River and Harbor, one of the stalls/stores was of stuffed and children's play fiber animals called "Dr. Watson's Zoo," owned and operated by the now retired Dr. Watson.

In 2004, the zoo was struck by financial problems and was forced to reduce its collection size temporarily by closing parts of the zoo. The original Main Valley was closed due to its age, being incapable of holding animals comfortably with their older style of iron-barred cages and stone walls, and in addition, the Reptile House which is located some distance away from the main zoo in an adjacent section of the Park was closed. The reptiles, as well as gibbons, tigers, and snow leopards, were sent to other zoos and aquariums. By 2008, Baltimore's Maryland Zoo was featured in "America's Best Zoos 2008."

On September 28, 2021, the zoo reopened the original Main Valley to guests as a walking path, providing the zoo's history and several historic landmarks. "While there are some bird species still residing in the Crane Barn, which has been updated throughout the years, there are no animals in the old exhibits and cages as they are hopelessly outdated and non-functional, Animals will not be returning to the obsolete cages, but we have launched a planning process to consider ways to accommodate the return of animals to Main Valley at some point in the future.” said Kirby Fowler (The Maryland Zoo's President and CEO).

On August 23, 2022, the Zoo unveiled a ten-year master plan that aims to enhance the visitor experience and include new habitats for the animals. The first new exhibit of the master plan to be built was for red pandas, with construction beginning in May 2025 and concluding in June 2026.

== Exhibits ==
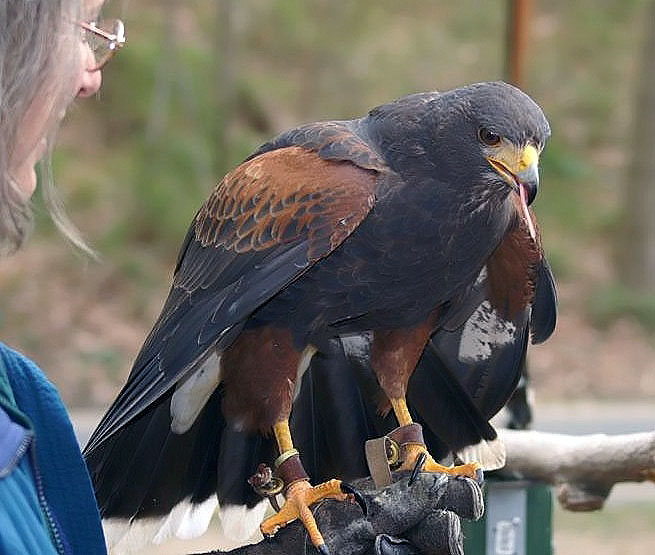
A Harris's hawk with zookeeper.

The zoo has five main areas: Schaefer Plaza, Zoo Central, Maryland Wilderness, Northern Passage, and African Journey. Visitors enter the main ticketing gate of the zoo at Schaefer Plaza named in honor of former Baltimore Mayor and Maryland Governor William Donald Schaefer (1921-2011). The plaza features a gift shop, a playground area known as "Celebration Hill", the zoo's original lion statues, and the black-tailed prairie dog exhibit. The small-model diesel train makes a one-mile circuit and over a 105-foot (32 m) bridge through parts and scenery of the Zoo, remembering the heritage of the old Baltimore and Ohio Railroad in the city and state, with its long-time decorated colors of blue and gray colors on the locomotive and cars of the old historic road, first railroad built in America since 1827. There has been a zoo train for many years, though the equipment and route has changed several times. The current zoo train from 2010 is pulled by a bright red new detailed scale replica of the 1863-era "C. P. Huntington" locomotive, named for a famous railroading tycoon and magnate in California and Virginia in the 19th and early 20th centuries.

=== Main Valley ===
Directly connecting Schaefer Plaza to the main zoo is the historic "Main Valley." While all of the original enclosures in the Main Valley are empty, nearby is the similarly historic "Crane Barn," a building previously housing ungulates but now housing Abyssinian ground hornbill and a pair of lappet-faced vultures. In June of 2026, the zoo finished an exhibit for red pandas, which share the space with a Reeve's muntjac and Indian peafowl. A passenger shuttle also connects visitors to Zoo Central free of charge. Zoo Central features a concessions area, carousel, and children's train ride that traverses the north side of the African Journey exhibit.

=== African Journey ===
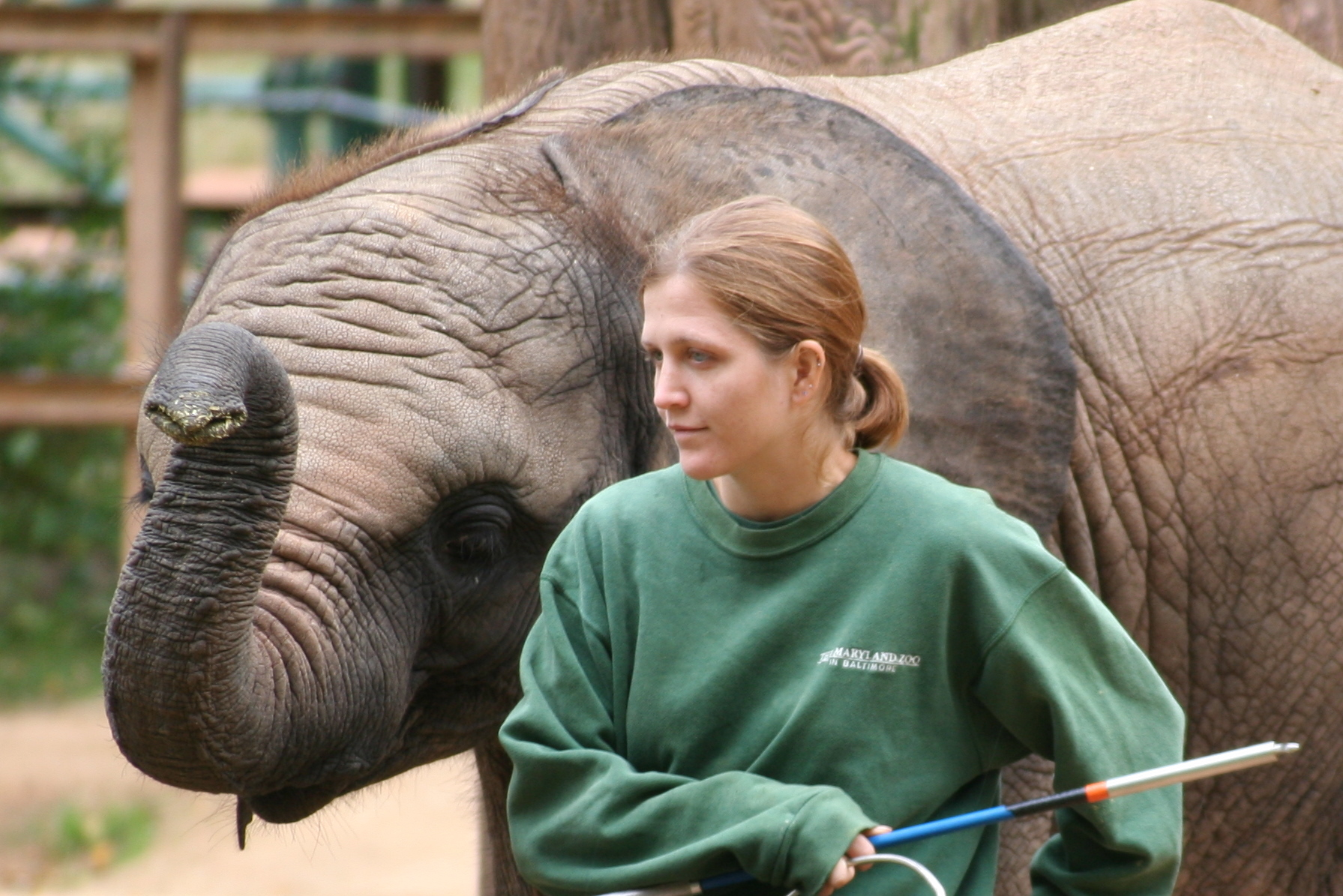
Samson, a baby elephant, with a zookeeper.

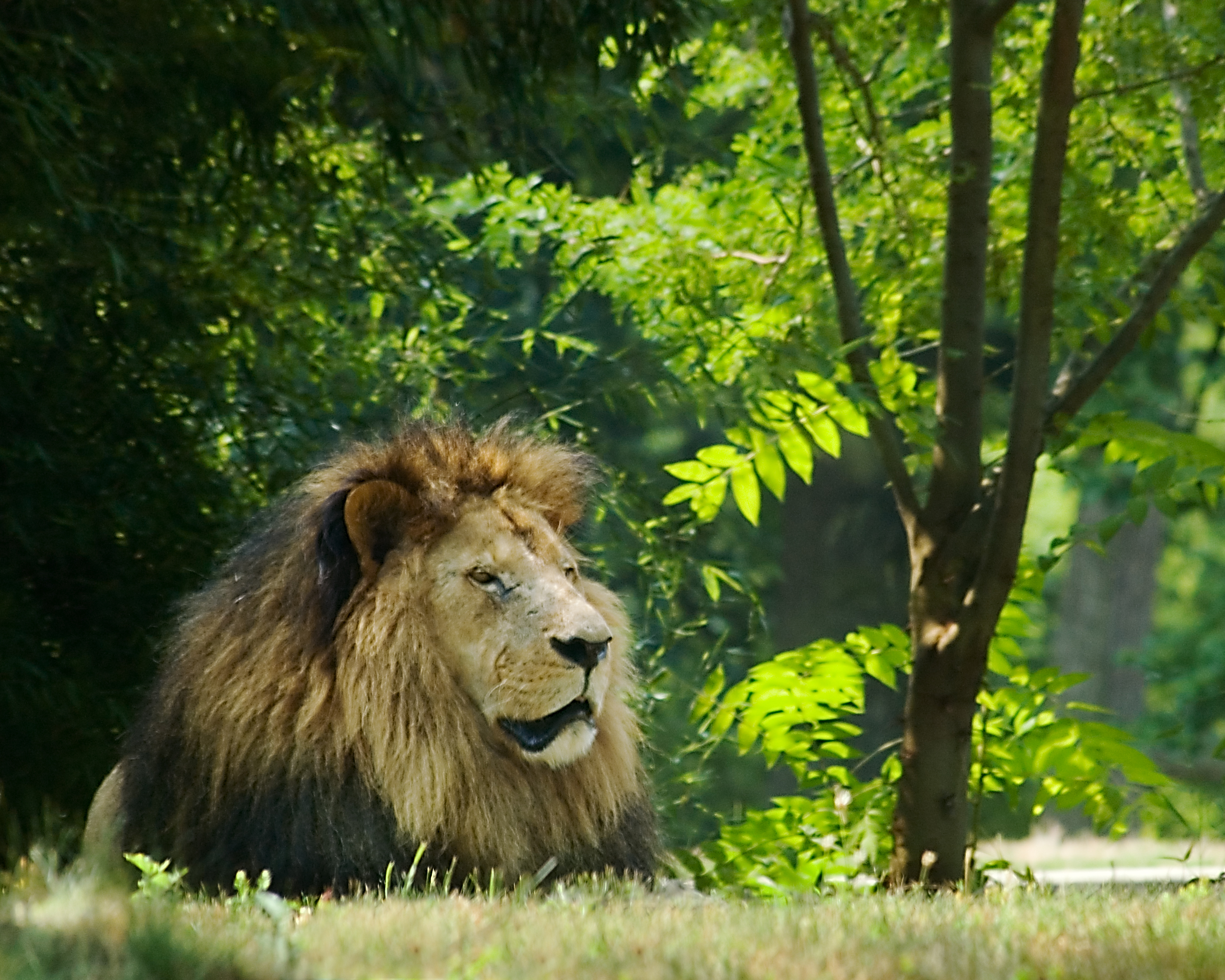
An African lion at the African Overlook exhibit.

The largest area of the zoo, "The African Journey" displays a wide range of animals originating from the continent of Africa. The main exhibit areas are:

- African Aviary: features an enclosed walk-through aviary home to the blue-bellied roller, hadada ibis, African spoonbill, Von der Decken's hornbill, hamerkop, fulvous whistling duck, spur-winged lapwing, Waldrapp ibis, Red-crested pochard, and Marbled duck.
- African Watering Hole: Features a watering hole environment with dama gazelle, lesser kudu, saddle-billed stork, Southern white rhinoceros, Grant's zebra, and common ostrich. The Caribbean flamingo, ground hornbill, sitatunga, Sulcata tortoise, leopard tortoise, Amur leopard, and Cape porcupine are located around the watering hole area along the boardwalk.
- African Overlook: Features the African lion exhibit area and reticulated giraffe viewing area. common warthog and blue duiker are located nearby.
- Chimpanzee Forest: Indoor and outdoor areas home to the chimpanzee, red-tailed guenon, Panamanian golden frogs, East African black mud turtle, and slender-snouted crocodile.
- Elephant Savannah: Large observation area for the African bush elephant.
- Giraffe Crossing: home to the Giraffe House, feeding station, and okapi.
- Lemur Lane: An outdoor exhibit featuring the red ruffed lemur, ring-tailed lemur, colobus monkey, and Coquerel's sifaka.

Renovations on the elephant exhibit facility began 2007. In March 2006, the Maryland Zoo announced it would be accepting three female African elephants from the Philadelphia Zoo in Pennsylvania as part of the expanded elephant exhibit, but construction was then indefinitely delayed and later the elephant loan was canceled. However, two new elephants came to the Maryland Zoo from Arkansas in 2007. On March 19, 2008, "Felix," one of the Zoo's female elephants, gave birth to a 290-pound male calf named "Samson", the first elephant born in the Zoo's history. In spring 2010, the Zoo's warthogs had two male offspring, which were viewable beginning in May of that year. In February 2017, the first giraffe calf was born at the Zoo in over 20 years. Willow was born to parents Juma and Caesar, and was 185 centimeters tall and 125 pounds (57 kg) at birth.

In March 2018, the zoo announced plans to expand the zoo's elephant, giraffe and lion exhibits. This $20 million project was made to improve living standards for the animals and also to give a much better viewing experience for guests of the zoo. The details of this initiative included the expansion of the Elephant habitat from 0.92 acres (3,700 m^{2}) to 2.1 acres (8,500 m^{2}), the expansion of the Giraffe habitat by 33%, the removal of what used to be "Rock Island" and several new viewing areas for the lions. The renovations finished in the summer of 2019. In July and December 2019, the Zoo welcomed two baby chimpanzees.

=== Maryland Wilderness featuring The Children's Zoo ===
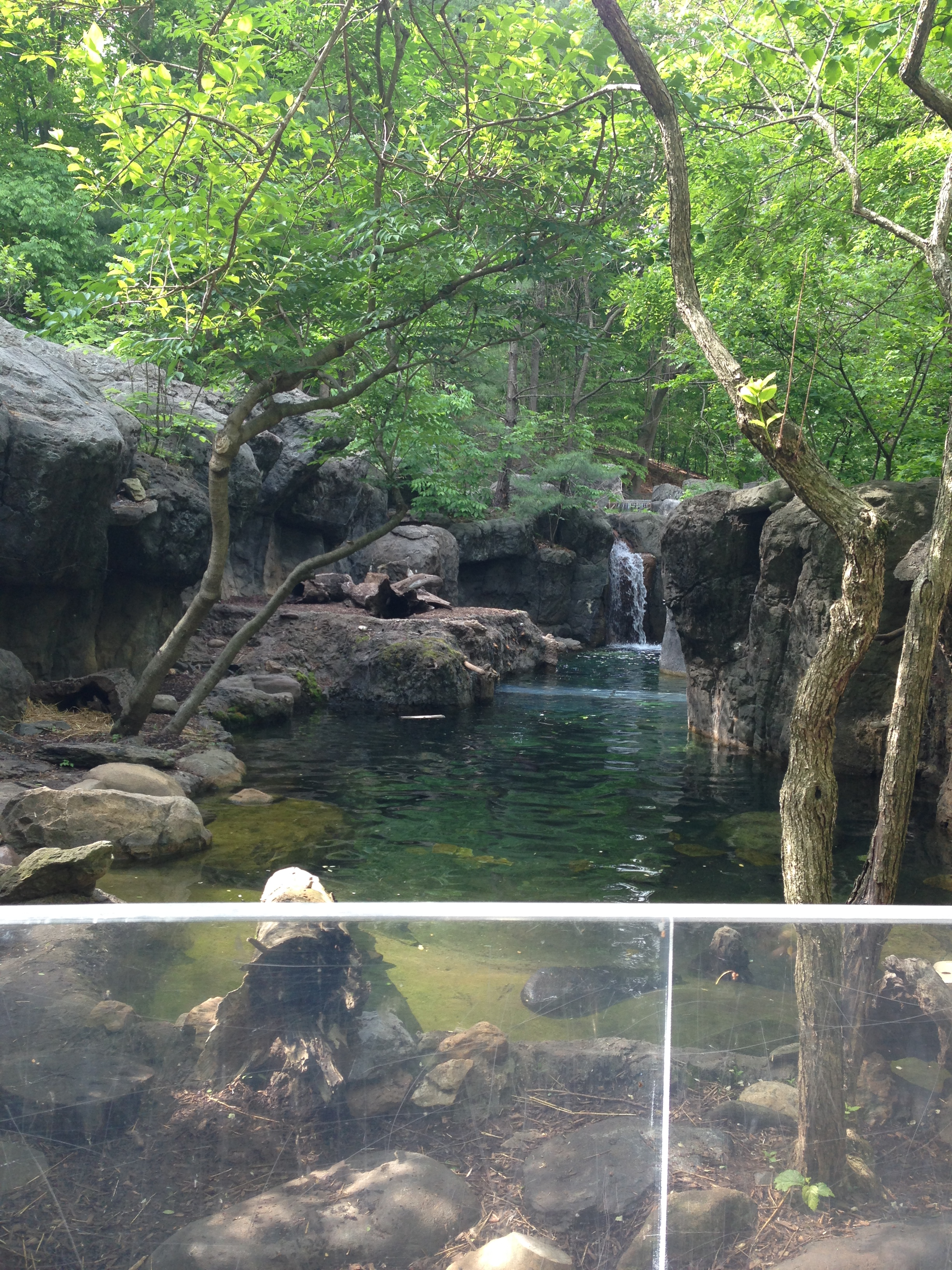
The Stream at Maryland Wilderness.

Displaying animals found in Maryland, visitors can watch otters swim over their heads, jump across lily pads, explore a cave, or climb into giant bird nests.

- "The Bog": formerly featured the endangered bog turtle, now in the Meadow tunnel.
- "Marsh Aviary and Lily Pads": surrounds a man-made stream featuring many species of ducks and other Maryland birds such as the turkey vulture, black-crowned night heron, and Sandhill crane.
- "The Stream": includes habitats river otters and eastern hellbenders. One can visit a submerged archway, and watch as otters swim overhead. Nearby is a Bobcat exhibit, renovated from the former Red fox exhibit.
- "The Cave": a beautifully sculpted life-size model of a cave, featuring more than a dozen small exhibits including Seba's short-tailed bats, red-spotted newts, and others.
- "Giant Tree and Slide": features many native reptiles and amphibians animals, mainly snakes. The slide is a fun way for kids to get back to the ground.
- "Meadow": has animals such as Eastern box turtles, American toads, and a broadhead skink. Kids can poke their heads in large bubble-like windows coming out of the ground. It also features a tunnel that leads to terrariums inside.
- "The Farmyard": features a variety of domestic breeds that can be touched; the highlight is a petting area of friendly African pygmy goats and Nigerian dwarf goats called "Goat Corral", sponsored by Mt. Washington Pediatric Hospital. Other animals included in the section include Cotswold sheep, Indian peafowl, Miniature Donkey, alpaca, trumpeter swan, Kunekune pigs, and Miniature Texas Longhorn.

The "Maryland Wilderness" featuring The Children's Zoo is dedicated to donator and supporter, Lyn P. Meyerhoff (1927-1988), who was the wife of philanthropist Harvey Meyerhoff.

=== Northern Passage ===
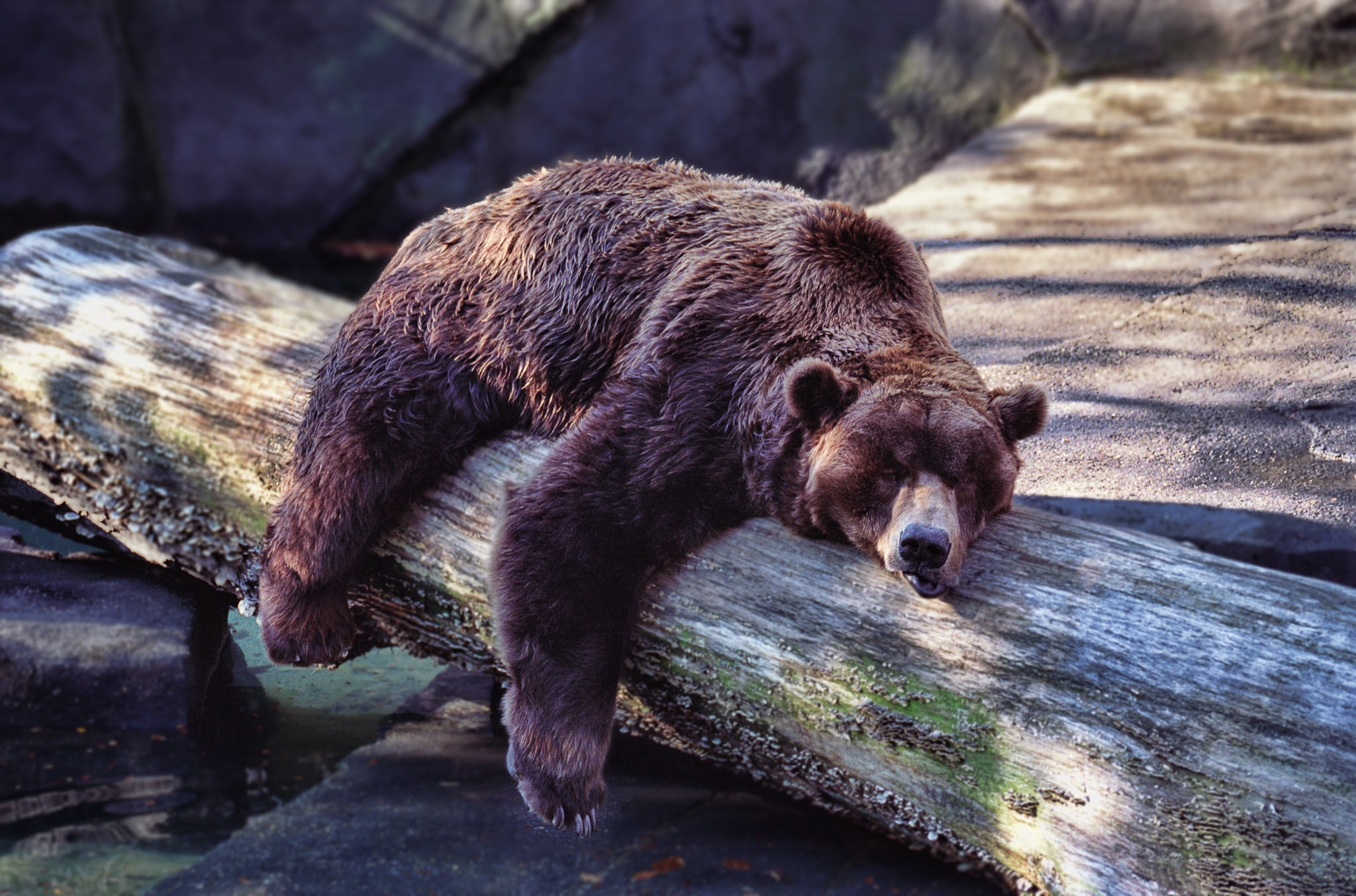
A Grizzly bear (Ursus arctos) taking a rest at the Northern Passage exhibit.

The Northern Passage currently features grizzly bears and a rescued bald eagle. It originally opened in 2003 as the Polar Bear Watch and formerly featured polar bears, arctic foxes, snowy owls, a North American porcupine, and common ravens. Guests can view the bears from underwater viewing areas, or from the windows of an actual massive Tundra Buggy, purchased from the Canadian company that creates these one of kind vehicles for viewing the polar bear in its natural habitat.

The exhibit was formerly home to Magnet the polar bear. Magnet was born in 1988 at the Toledo Zoo in Ohio and arrived at the zoo in 1991. He won the Beast in Show contest put forth by Microsoft's Zoo Tycoon for best zoo animal in December 2001. Magnet was available as a downloadable patch for the game and during the game, polar bears purchased via the Magnet icon would play with a red ball. The real Magnet was euthanized in April 2015 due to kidney disease. During his later years, he lived with two female polar bears, Alaska and Anoki, but did not produce any offspring.

Beginning in March 2017, the Polar Bear Watch became home to two rescued orphaned grizzly bear cubs. They are named Nova and Nita after their names were chosen in a public contest in April 2017. The polar and grizzly bears regularly rotated around each exhibit. As of November 2021, polar bears were removed from the exhibit and the name of the exhibit changed to the Northern Passage.

==== Penguin Coast ====
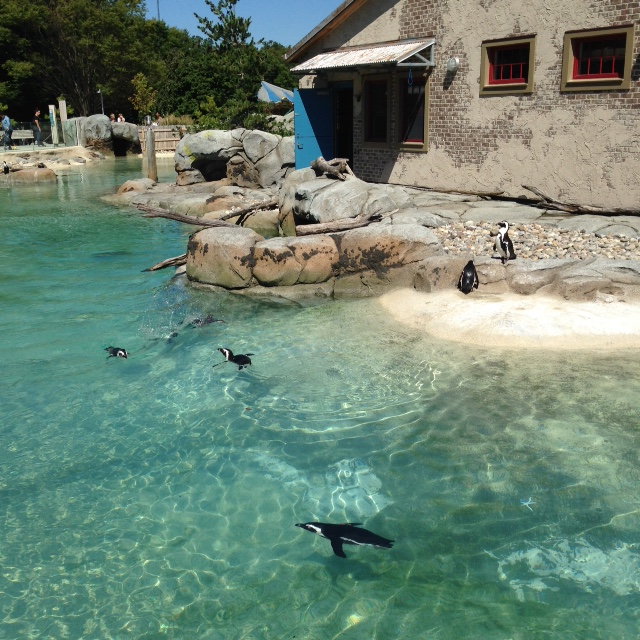
Penguin Coast.

The Zoo’s state-of-the-art African penguin exhibit located between Northern Passage and African Journey opened on September 27, 2014. It brings guests up-close to nearly 60 (and growing) African black-footed penguins, white-breasted cormorants, and great white pelicans in a vivid re-creation of their natural habitat along the coasts and islands of South Africa. There is an underwater viewing window and view to a tidal pool that creates a wave-like effect for the birds.

The Zoo gives guests an extra peek into the lives of the penguins with the opportunity to see them get their daily fill of fish with morning and afternoon feedings.

Penguin Coast also includes an interpretive building which includes a multi-purpose room for education programs and animal demonstrations, restrooms, and indoor space for special events.

=== Past animals ===
- Snow leopard
- Gibbon
- Siberian tiger
- Hippopotamus
- Pygmy hippopotamus
- Spider monkey
- Asian elephant
- Polar bear
- Cheetah

== Conservation ==
The Maryland Zoo in Baltimore has been always active in many conservation programs, notably "Polar Bears International," "Project Golden Frog," and their work with African black-footed penguins. The zoo has the largest amount of African penguins in North America due in part to their active breeding program of the penguins. The zoo also helps rehabilitate local wildlife, especially birds of prey, such as bald eagles.

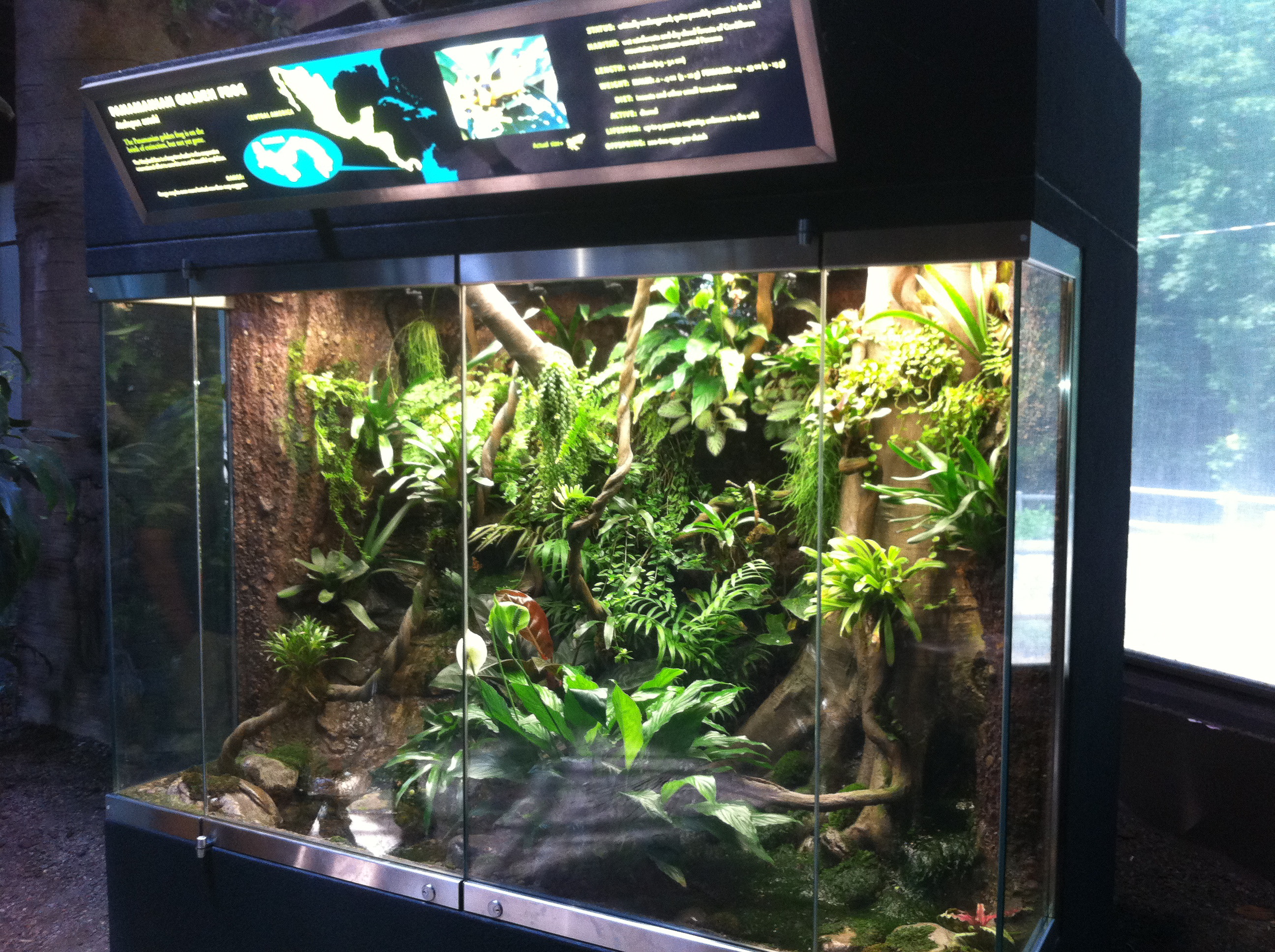
Project Golden Frog is one of the conservation programs at the zoo.

== In popular culture ==
- The Maryland Zoo is the focus of "The Big Zoo" in Little Mammoth Media's BIG Adventure Series, which was released in 1995. In the educational video, they talk how the zoo works for children including all the animals, the hospital, and what zookeepers do as well. The video also includes a special interview with then-zoo director Roger Birkel.

== Gallery ==
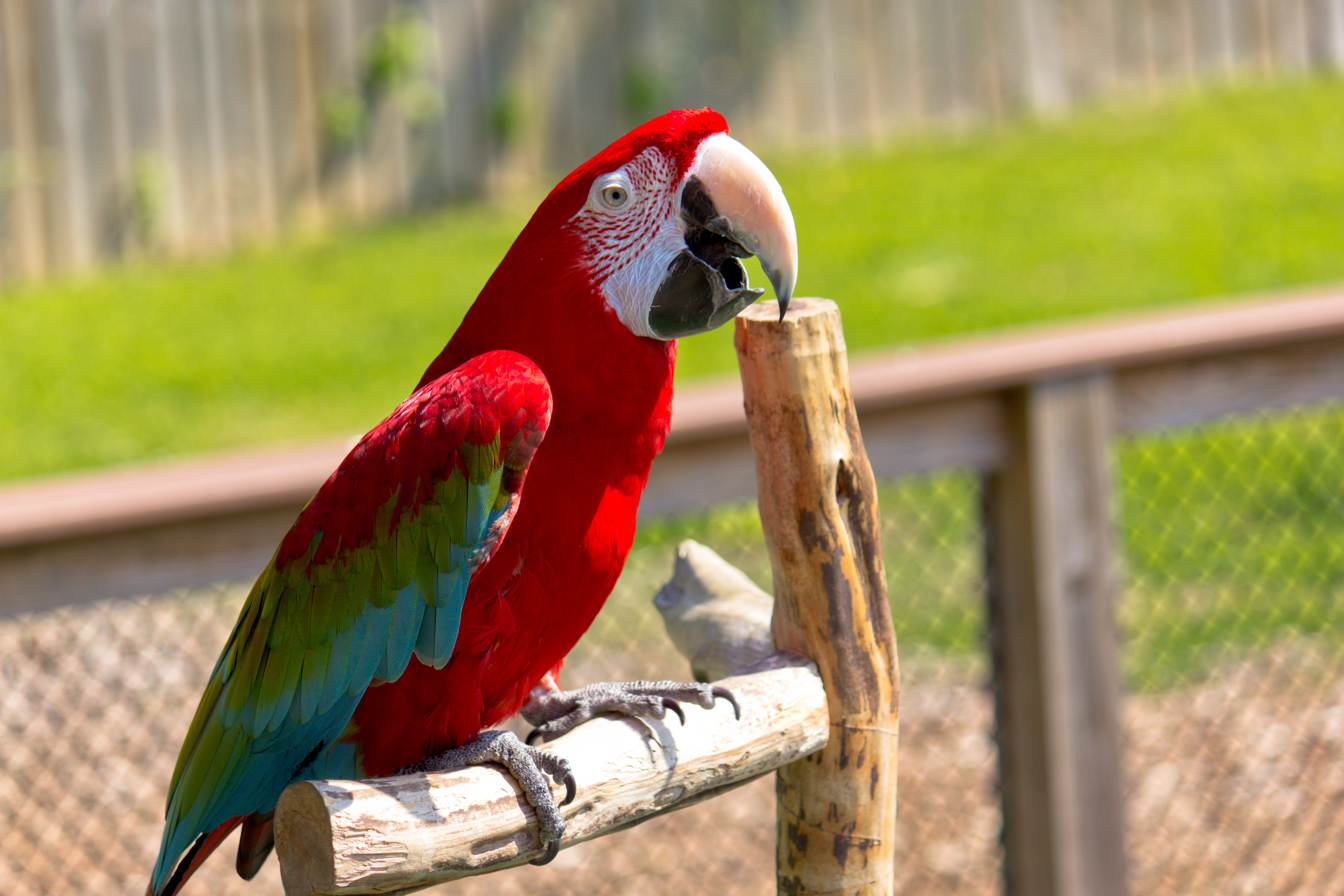
A Red-and-green macaw at a keeper talk.

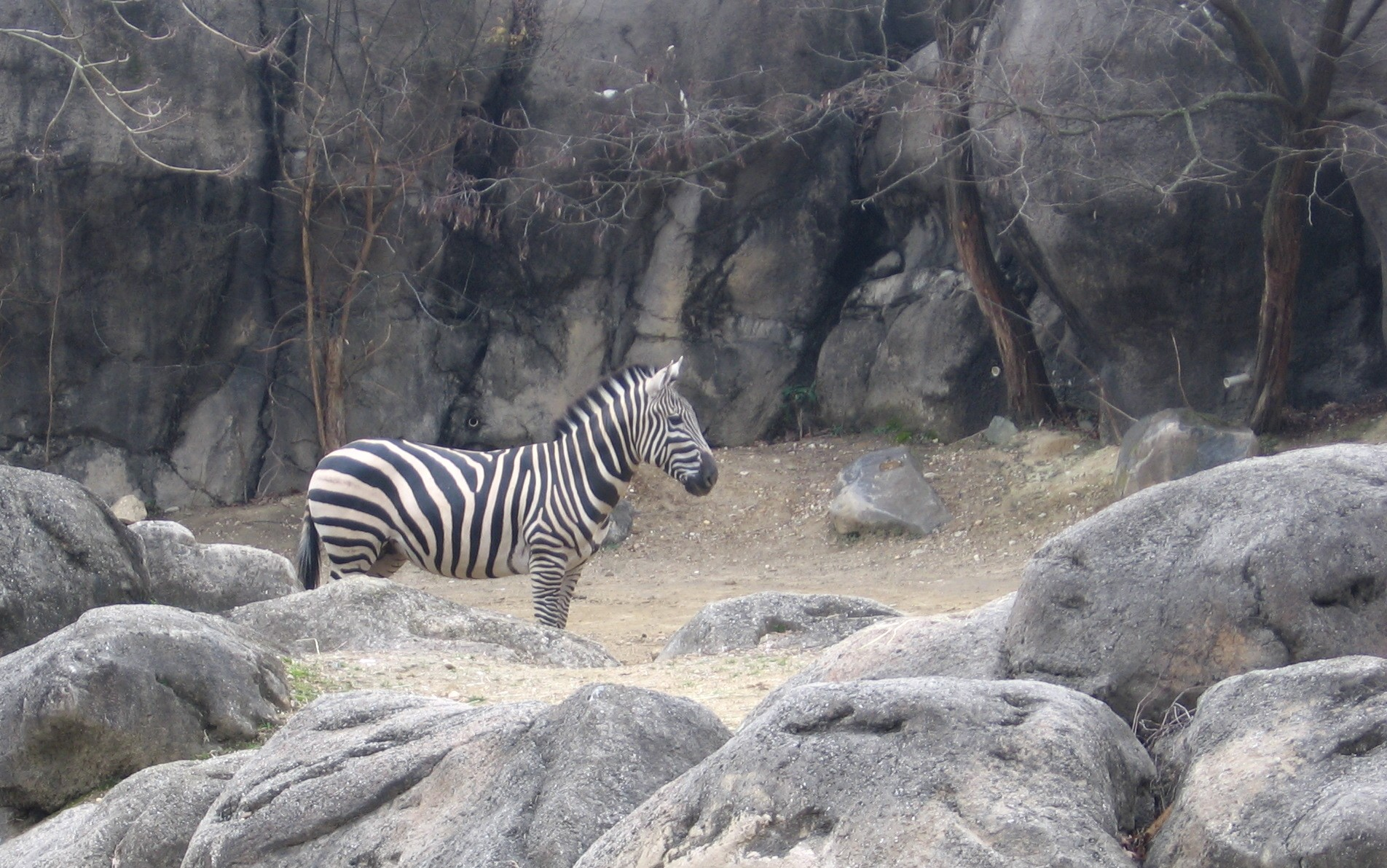
A plains zebra in the Watering Hole habitat of the African Journey exhibit.

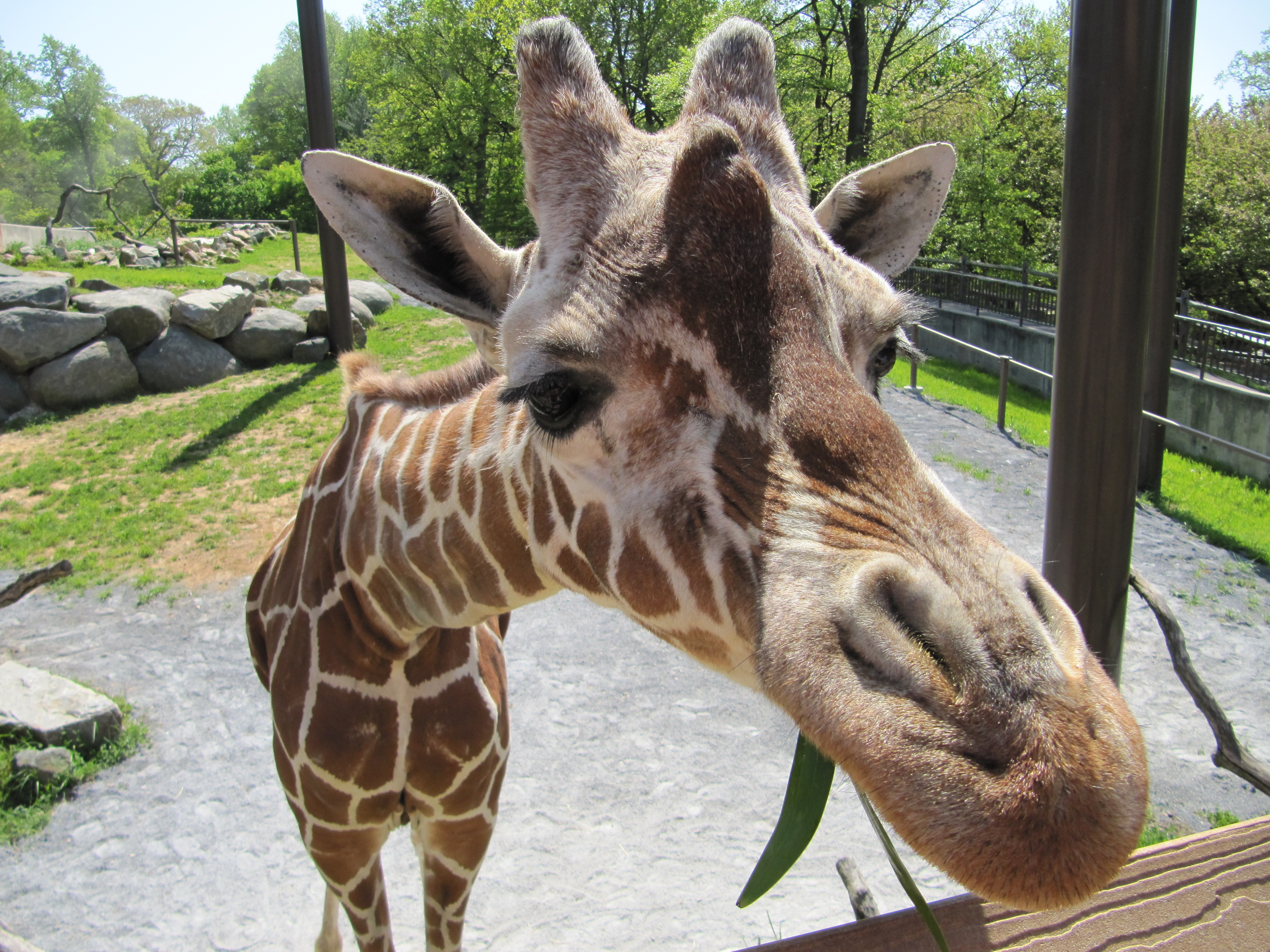
A reticulated giraffe at the zoo.

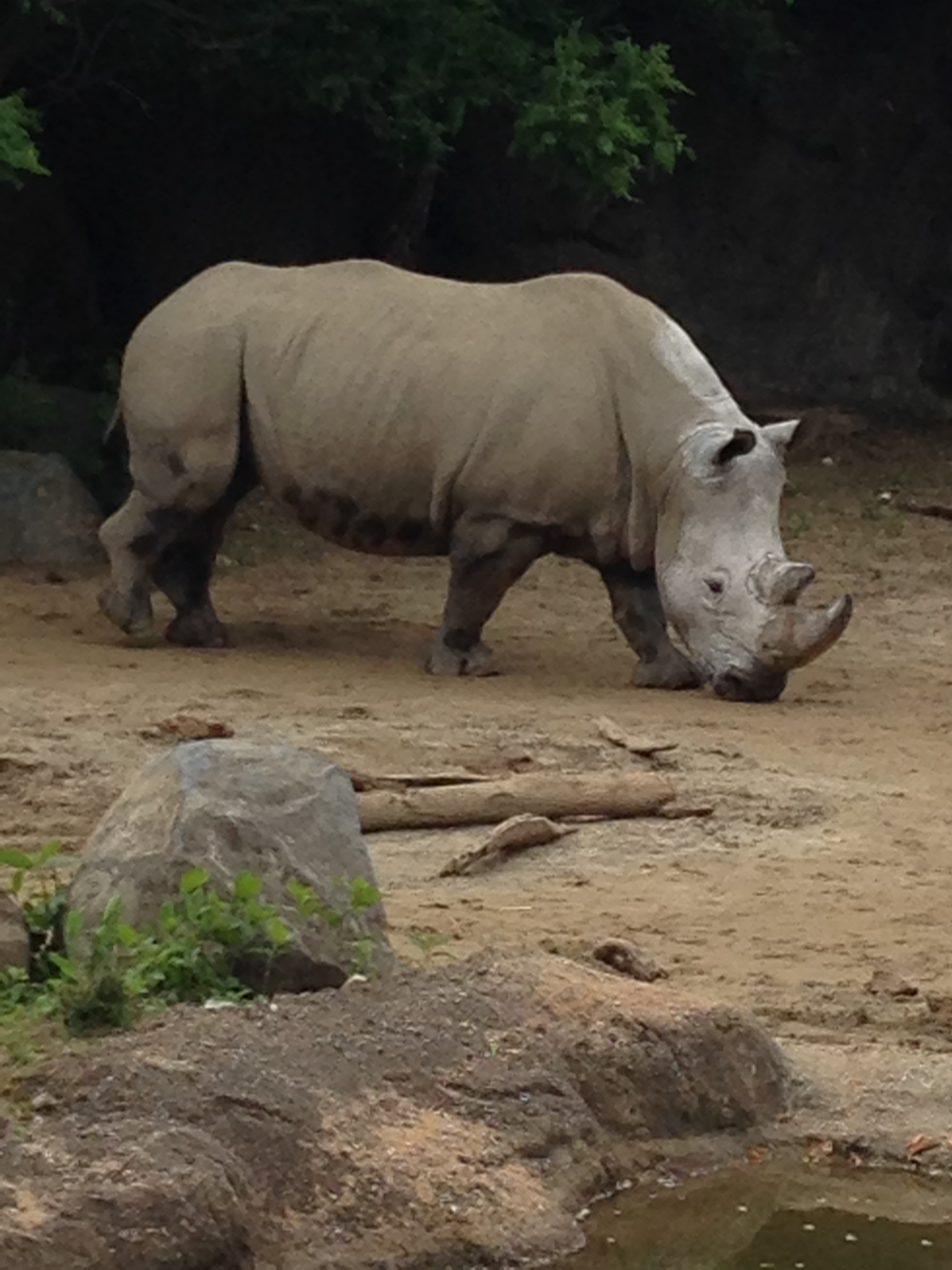
Southern White Rhino.

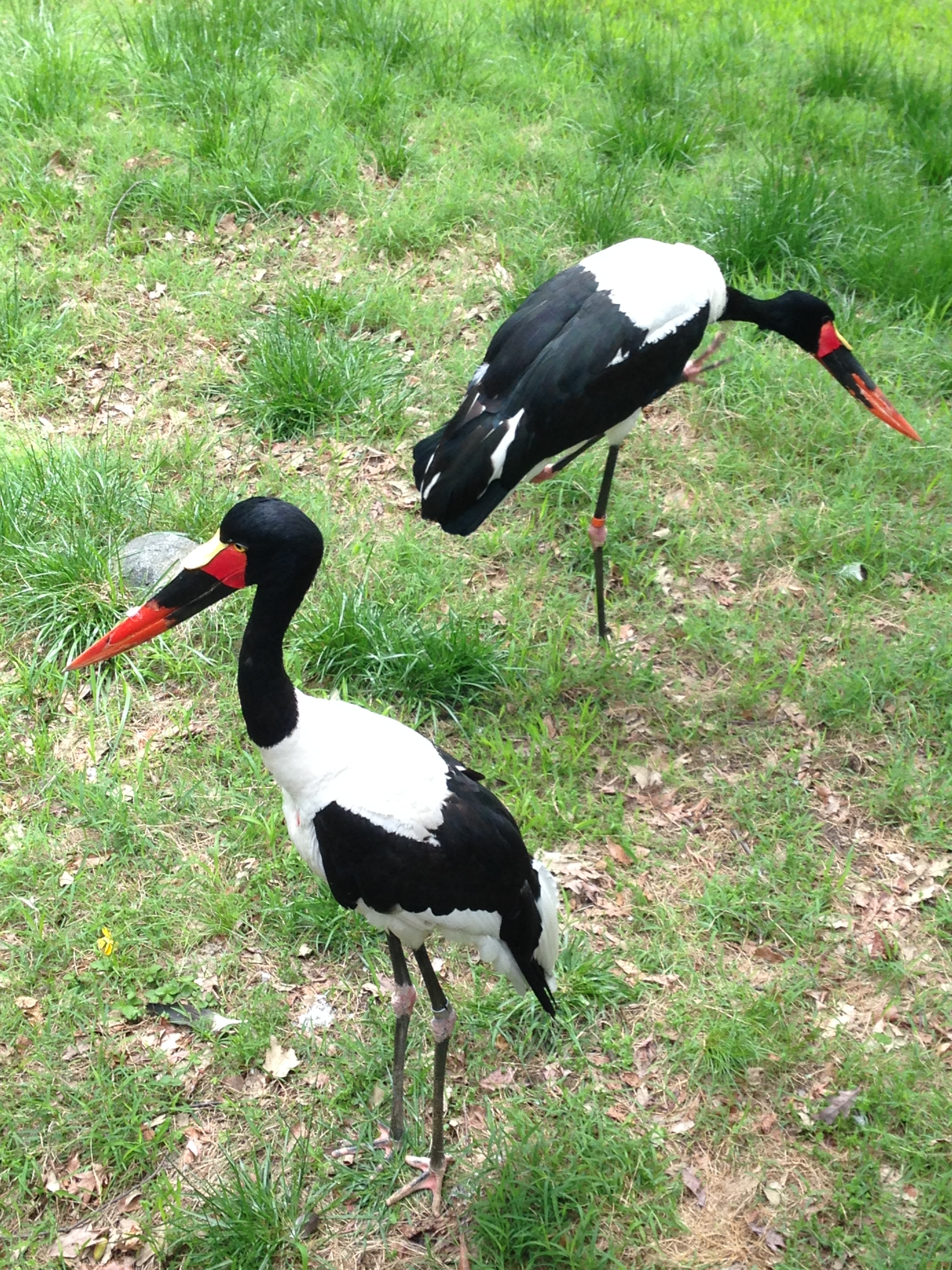
Saddle-billed Stork.

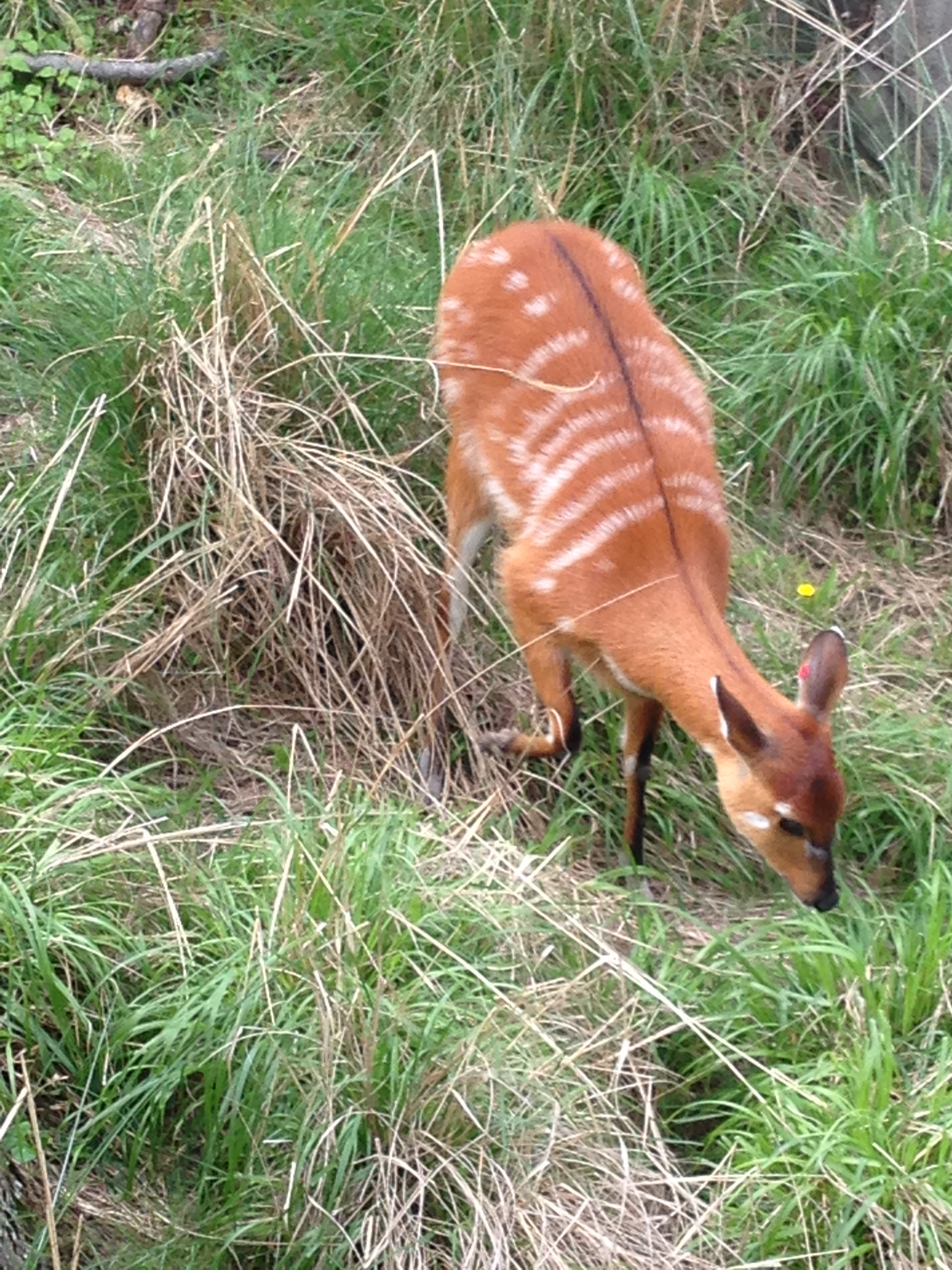
A Sitatunga (Tragelaphus spekii) eating grass.

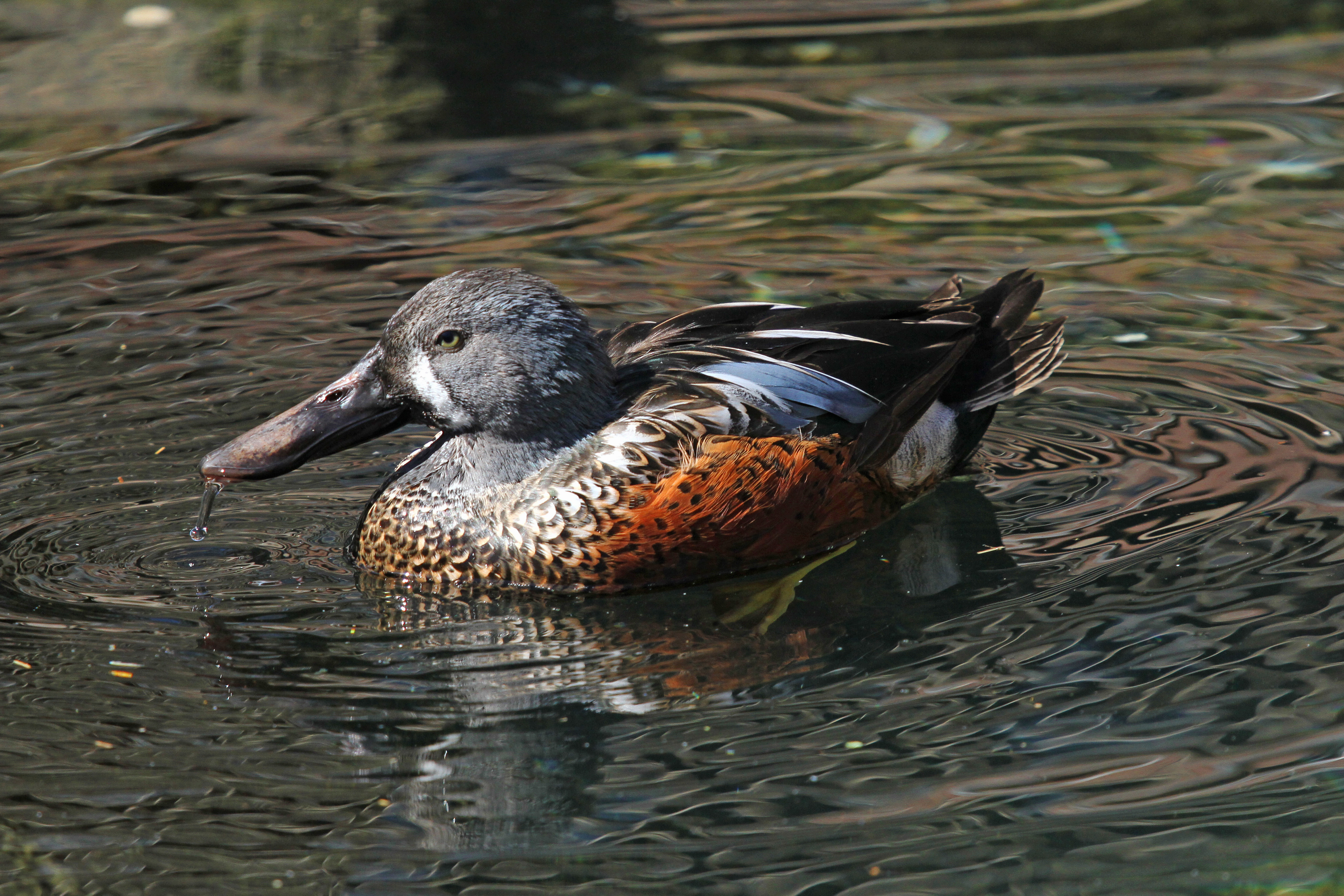
Australasian Shoveler.

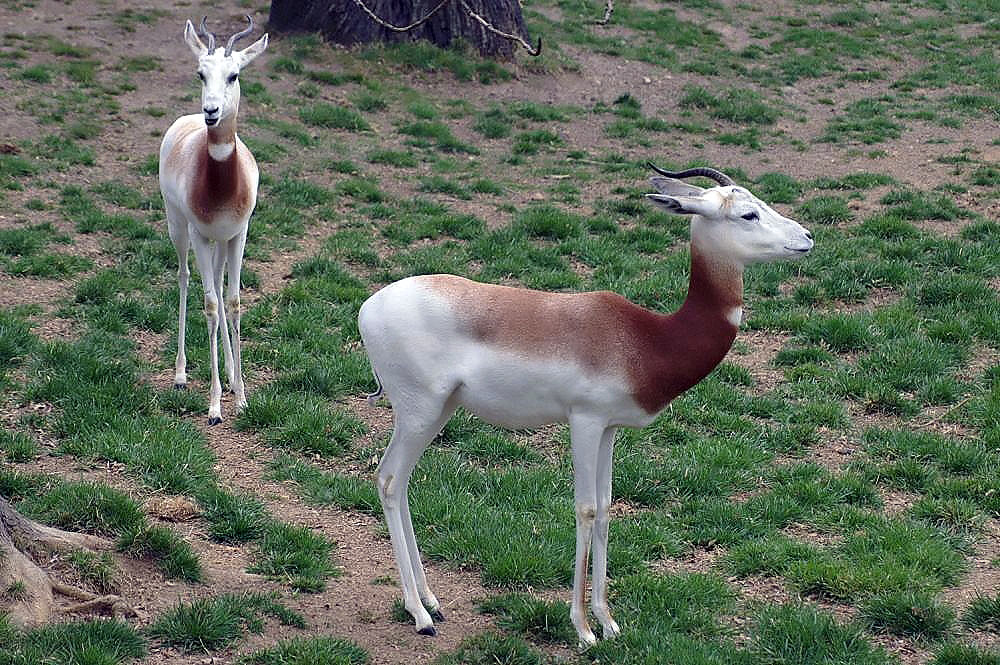
Dama gazelle (Nanger dama).

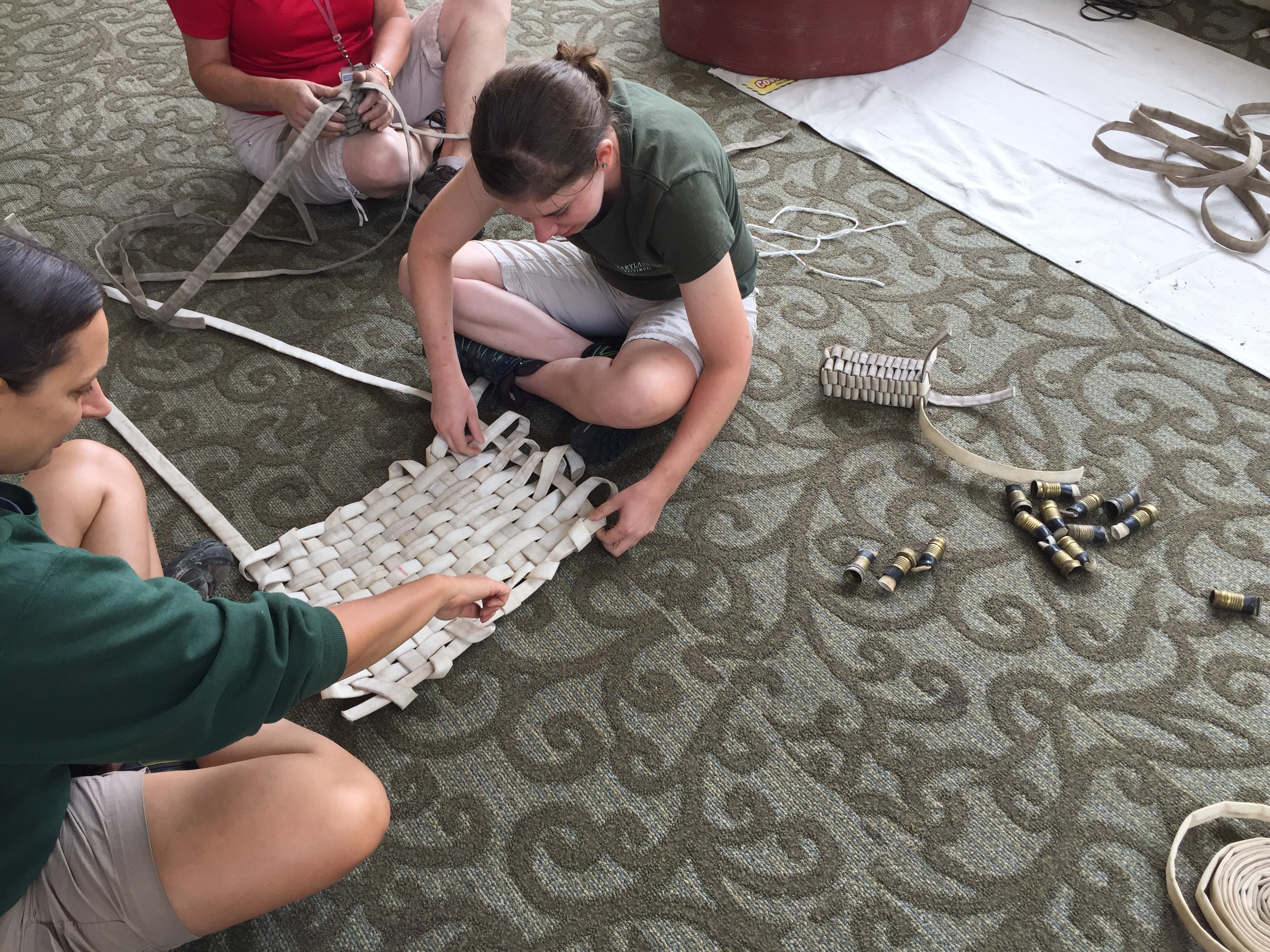
Keepers at a workshop learning how to repurpose old firehouses into animal enrichment items.
