= Pet store =

Retailer which sells animals to the public

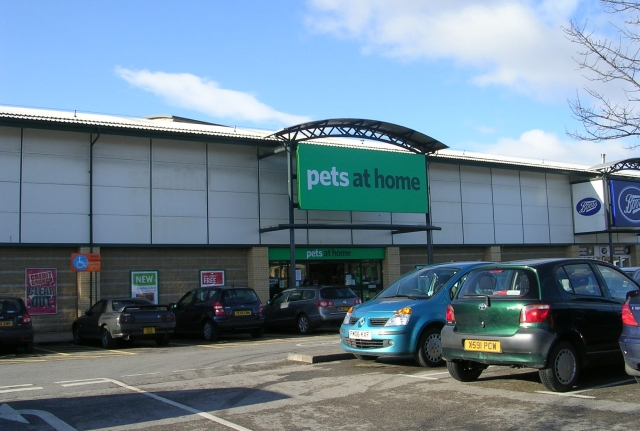
A Pets at Home in Bradford.

A pet shop or pet store is an essential services retailer which sells animals and pet care resources to the public. A variety of animal supplies and pet accessories are also sold in pet shops. The products sold include: food, treats, toys, collars, leashes, cat litter, cages and aquariums.

Pet shops may also offer both hygienic care (such as pet cleaning) and aesthetic services (such as cat and dog grooming). Some pet stores also provide tips on training and behaviour, as well as advice on pet nutrition. Some pet stores provide engraving services for pet tags, which have the owner's contact information in case the pet gets lost.

== History ==
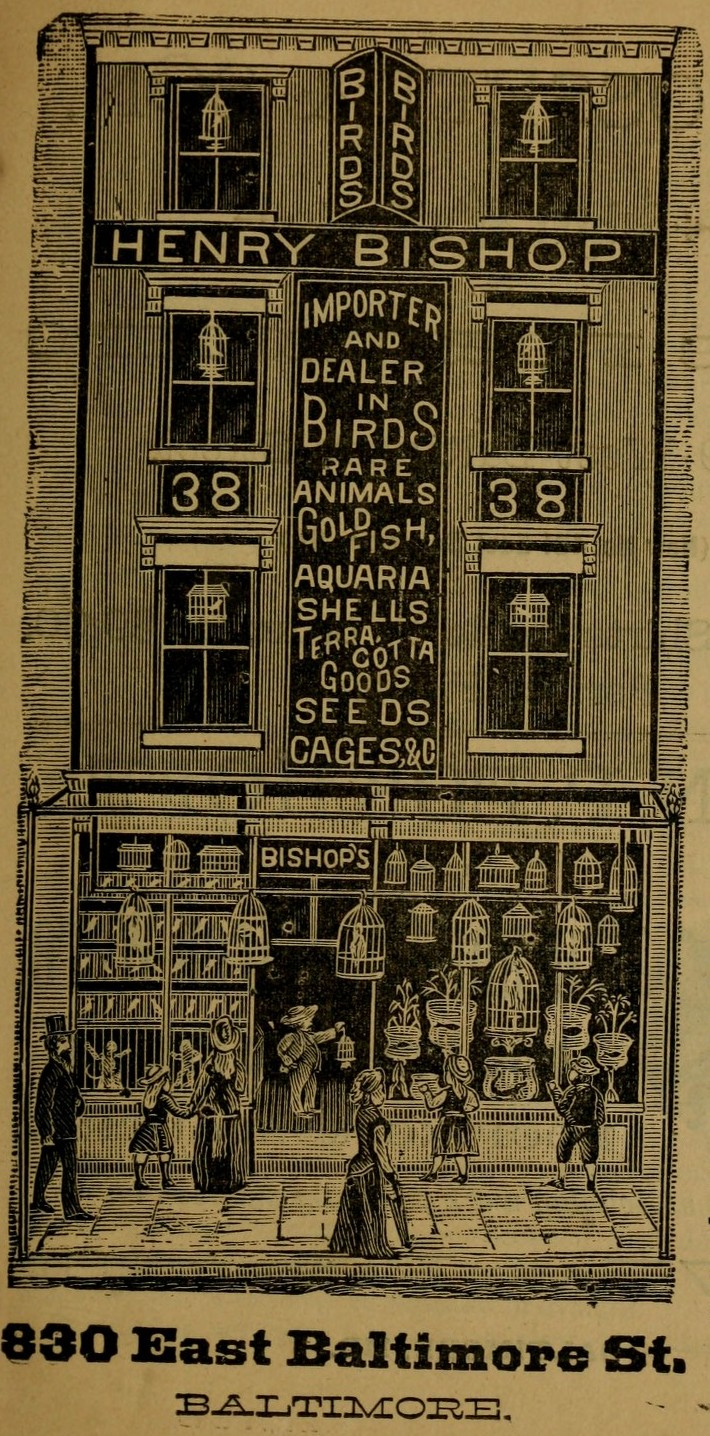
Henry Bishop c. 1886 had one of the first and largest pet stores in the US.

The modern pet store, with its wide array of animals and specialized supplies, has roots in the 19th century. The Victorian middle class in Europe and America fostered a new culture of keeping animals in the home, simply for companionship and pleasure. This cultural shift created the first real market for retail businesses dedicated to the pet trade. England was at the epicenter of this new culture, then it spread to the US and Europe, finally globally.

The earliest specialized pet shops were bird sellers, sometimes known as "bird fanciers". Canaries, finches, and increasingly exotic parrots became popular household pets in the mid-19th century. These early stores were typically small, urban establishments that sold not only live birds but also related supplies like ornate cages, seed mixes, and remedies. They were distinct from the street vendors or "bird-catchers" who trapped and sold wild native birds, representing a more established and often more upscale business. The burgeoning "aquarium craze" of the same era created a market for fish, tanks, and aquatic plants. Henry Bishop of Baltimore ("Gold Fish King"), is credited with revolutionizing the U.S. aquarium business in the 1870s and 1880s by stocking a wide variety of fish and aquarium supplies that would look familiar in a modern pet store.

A change in the pet supply industry occurred in the 1860s when an American electrician living in London named James Spratt developed the first commercially manufactured pet food: the "Meat Fibrine Dog Cake". Before Spratt's invention, dogs were fed table scraps. This shelf-stable, purpose-made biscuit was a revolutionary concept that allowed for the mass production and sale of pet food, creating a foundational product for the modern pet supply store.

After the creation of the modern pet store in the later 19th century, the biggest change in pet stores occurred in the 1990s and 2000s with the advent of the Internet.

== Countries ==
=== Brazil ===
In 2023, the Brazilian pet store trade had an estimated income of R$70 billion (US$14.02 billion). According to the Brazilian Association of the Pet Products Industry (Abinpet) and the Instituto Pet Brasil, Brazil is considered the third largest market (4.95%), behind only the United States (43.7%) and China (8.7%).

According to the Brazilian Institute of Geography and Statistics (IBGE), 44 out of every 100 families own a pet. It is estimated that there are more than 168 million pets in Brazil (of which more than 100 million are dogs and cats), with at least 56% of households having at least one dog or cat, within this data, 44% are inhabited by dogs and 21% by cats, an average of 1.72 dogs and 2.01 cats per household.

A license is required before being able to manage a pet store, with laws varying by state, although the sale of animals in pet stores is not prohibited.

=== Germany ===
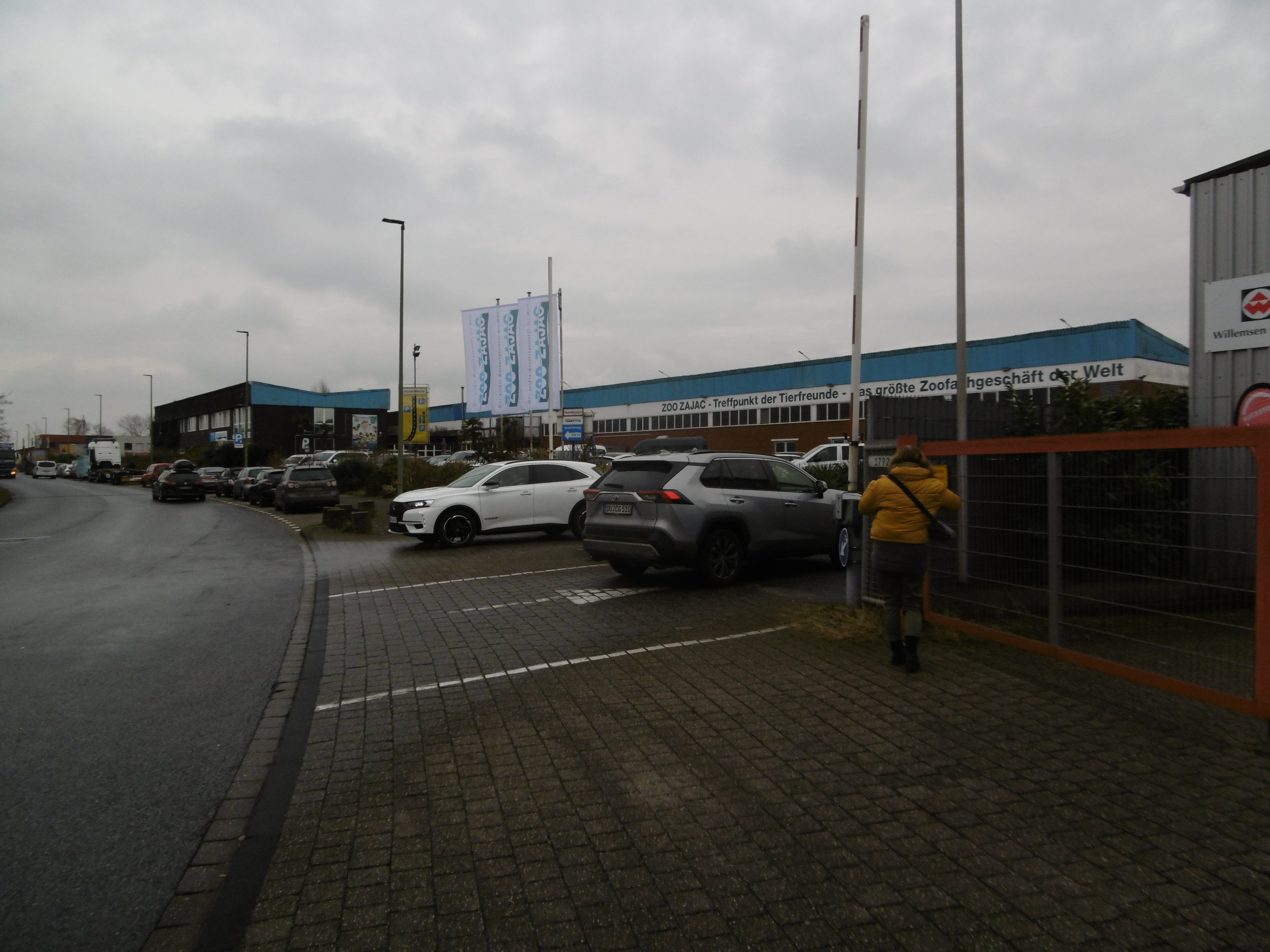
Zoo Zajac

The largest pet store in the world was located in Duisburg, Germany. Zoo Zajac was located in a 130,000 square-foot warehouse and houses more than 250,000 animals from 3,000 different species. The store has become a tourist attraction, with visitors interacting with it like a zoo. In 2025, the company filed for insolvency following the unexpected death of its founder, Norbert Zajac.

=== United Kingdom ===
In 1987, the British pet store trade had an estimated worth of £150 million. The largest pet store chain is Pets at Home.

In the United Kingdom, pet stores are prohibited from selling puppies and kittens less than six months old. The ban was announced in 2018 following public pressure to improve animal breeding standards.

=== United States ===
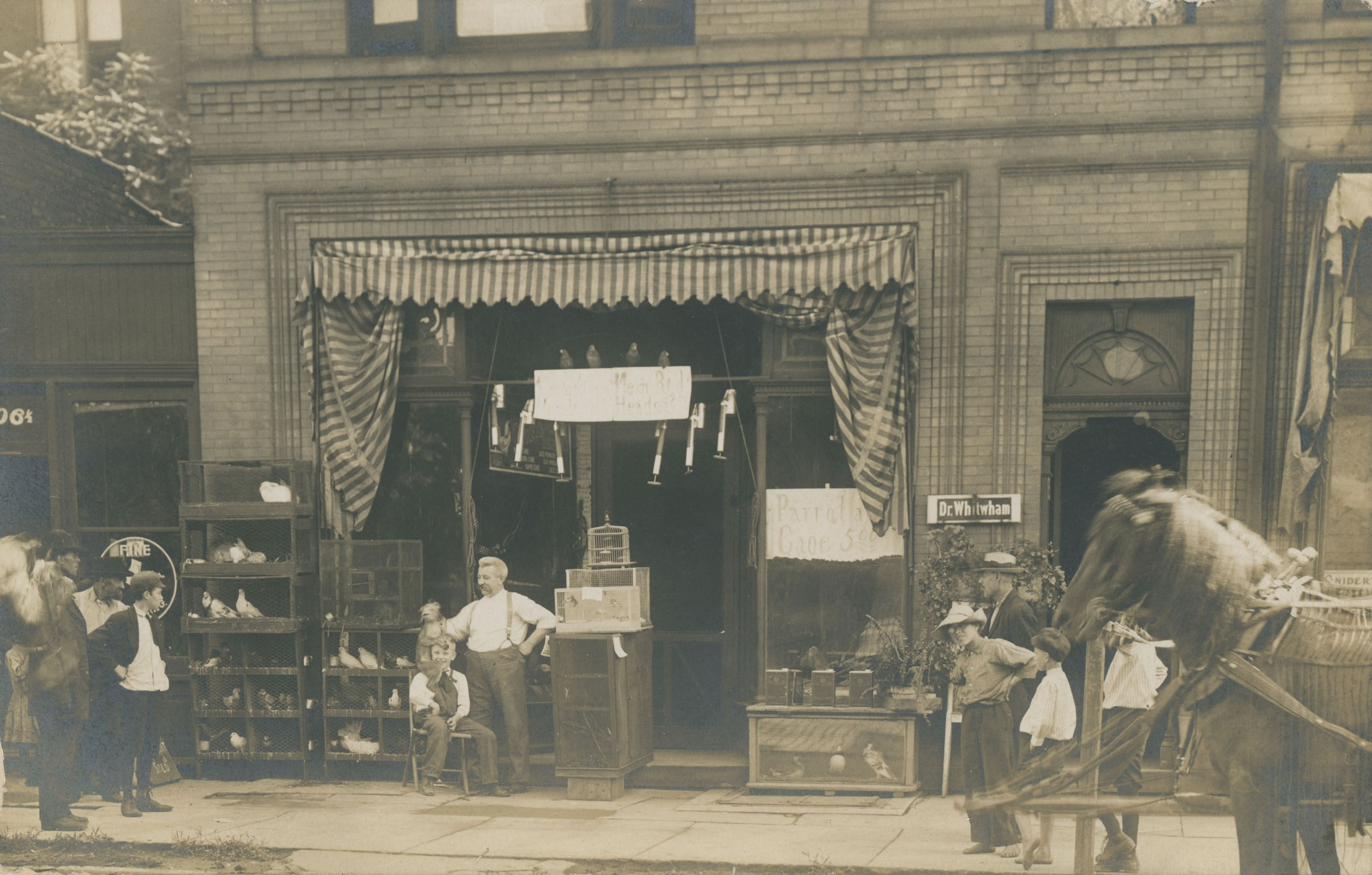
Henry Wersell's Pet Store in Toledo, Ohio in the early 20th Century.

In 2004, according to the American Pet Products Manufacturers Association, in the pet industry, live animal sales reached approximately $1.6 billion. In the United States, pet sales make up only 6% of the market, with most sales comprising accessories and merchandise. In a 2003 survey, 38% of U.S. pet shops claimed that they did not sell any live animals.

In 20 states and Washington, D.C., a license is required before being able to manage a pet store. There are 16 states that have laws which mandate veterinary care for animals being sold at the store. In some states and cities – such as California and Atlanta – the sale of common pets such as dogs, cats, and rabbits, is prohibited except for those from animal shelters, in an attempt to curb poor standards of animal breeding.

== See also ==
- Cat food
- Dog food
- Dog grooming
- Vet
