= Zoo Zajac =

Pet store in Duisburg, Germany

Coordinates: 51.491067°N 6.802009°E

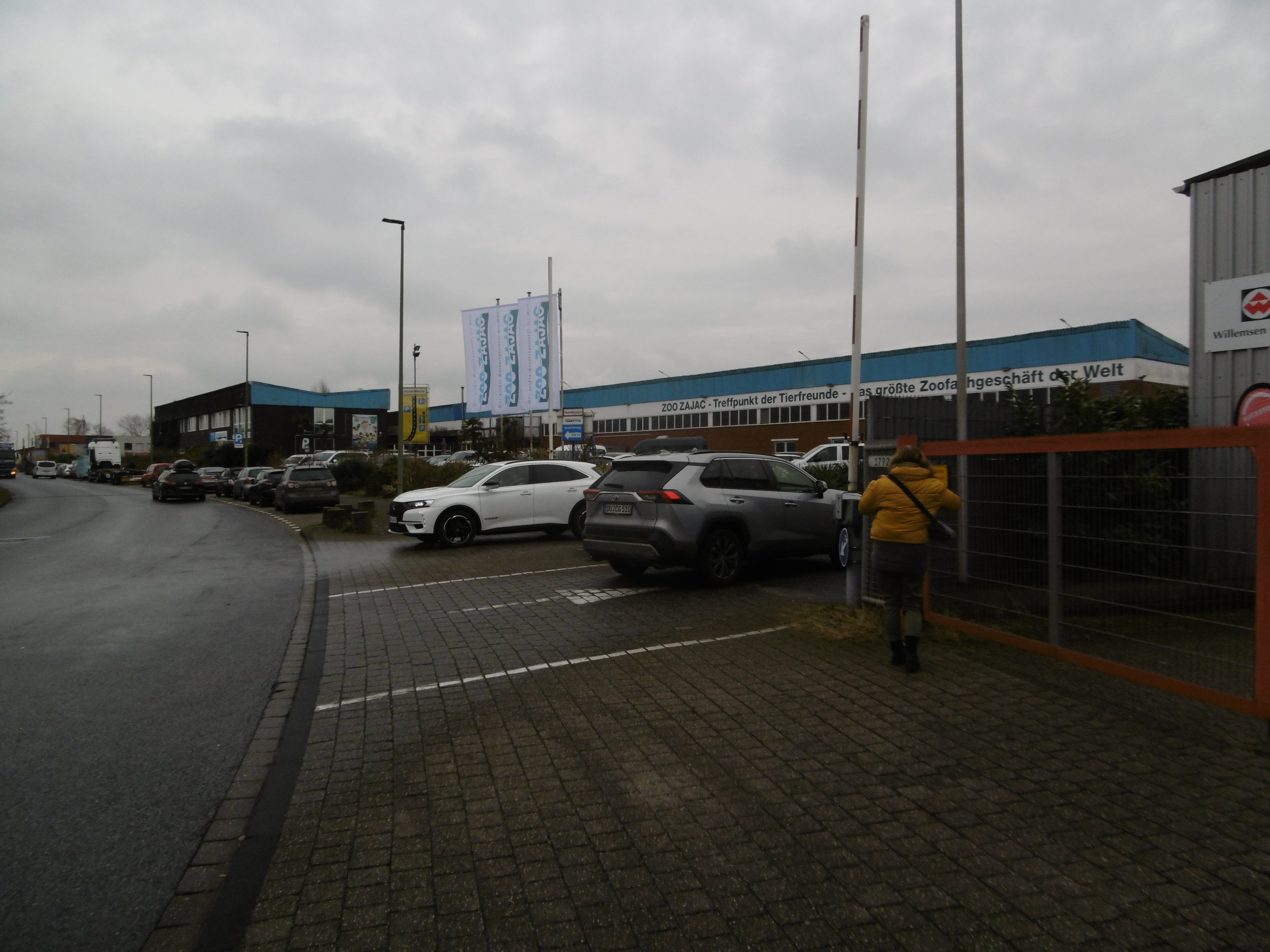
Zoo Zajac

Zoo Zajac (Zoo Zajac GmbH) was a pet store in Duisburg-Neumühl, Germany. According to the Guinness Book of World Record, has been the largest pet store in the world with a vending space of 8,070.26 square metres (86,867.6 sq ft) since 2005 . On March 14, 2025, the business closed due to insolvency.

The store with approximately 13,000 square metres (140,000 sq ft) vending space in 2022 includes more than 1,000 aquariums, 70 pond tanks, 500 terrariums, 40 aviaries, a cat enclosure, and 150 small mammal enclosures. It also claims to have the largest enclosure for dogs in Europe.

Norbert Zajac and his wife Jutta bought a pet store in Duisburg-Meiderich in 1975. He finally bought a former factory building in Duisburg-Neumühl to establish a new pet store, because he could not enlarge his former store.

According to Zajac, the shop had 200 employees, including veterinarians and biologists in 2010. It sold animals and equipment, had a revenue of 15 million Euros and 1 million buyers per year in 2009.

Norbert Zajac met criticism by animal protectionists. For example, he sold dog puppies, which is legal but not allowed by the professional association of pet shop owners (of which he was not a member). Norbert Zajac died at the age of 67 years on December 13, 2022.
