= Henry Bishop (bird man and goldfish king) =

American aquarist and aviculturist (1838–1907)

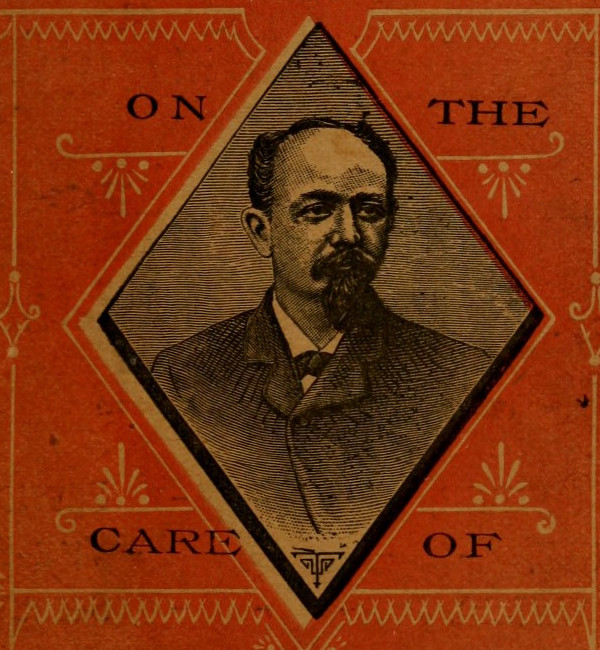
Henry Bishop c. 1886. Cover of Bishop, the Bird Man's Book

Henry Bishop (c. 1837/1838 - November 3, 1907), known to the public as both "Bishop the Bird Man" and the "Gold Fish King," was a Baltimore-area fish breeder (aquarist), bird seller, zoo supplier, and pet store founder. A German immigrant and entrepreneur, Bishop supplied aquariums and pet owners across the nation and is credited with revolutionizing the U.S. aquarium business. He was reputed to have the largest goldfish farm in the world. For his animal contributions to the city's zoological park, he was affectionately known as the "Father of the Baltimore Zoo".

== Biography ==
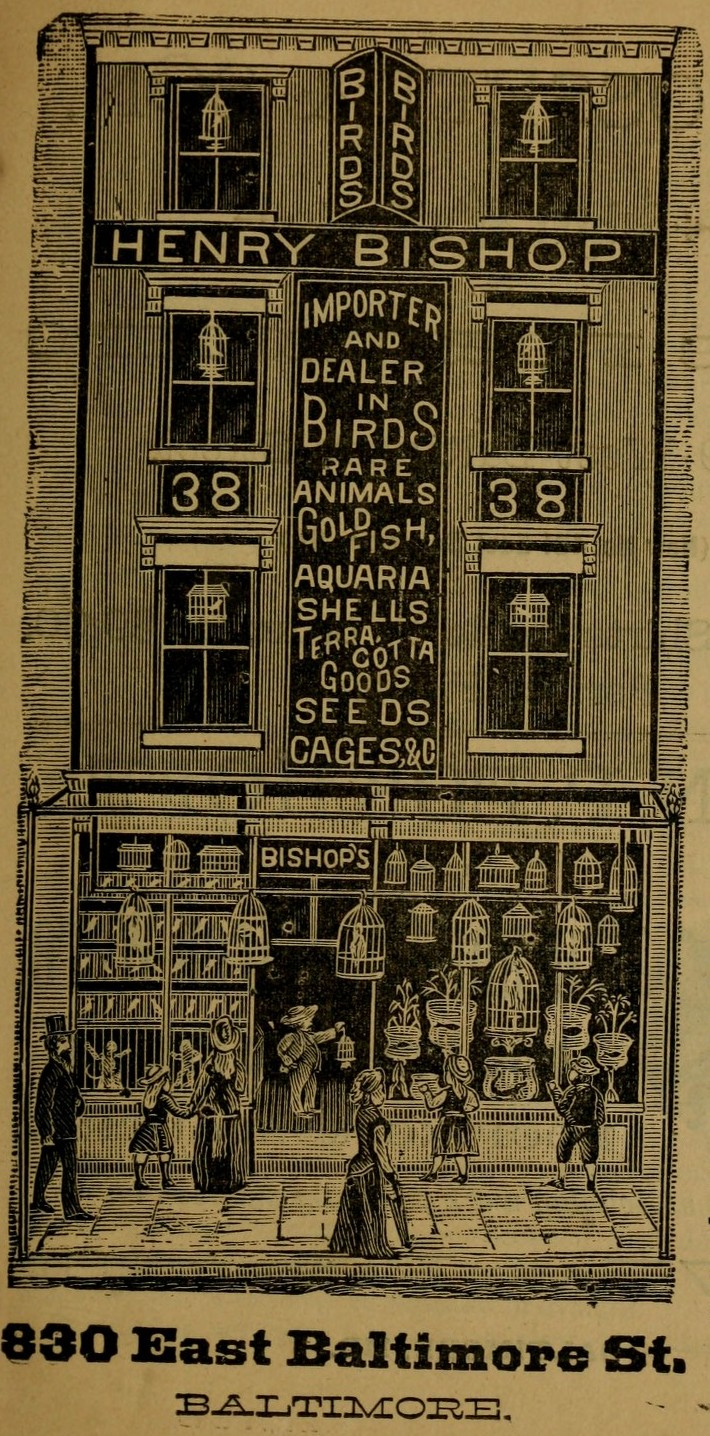
Henry Bishop, Inc., storefront in Baltimore c. 1886

Born c. 1837 or 1838 in Hanover, Germany, Henry Bishop was orphaned at a young age and raised by relatives, receiving a good education and developing an early interest in nature. Determined to emigrate to America, he spent several years working at sea; his travels in South and Central America broadened his exposure to exotic birds and fish. Upon arriving in the U.S., he became associated with P. T. Barnum's Hippodrome in New York around 1871 before settling in Baltimore in 1874. He opened his own pet store the same year. Originally established in Jonestown, a neighborhood with a large German immigrant population, Bishop began his business dealing in pet birds, which earned him the moniker "Bishop the Birdman". He sold a comprehensive catalog of supplies for their care, soon branching out to pet fish and aquarium equipment. According to the Washington Post, he "revolutionized the U.S. aquarium industry" by selling a wide range of tanks and supplies, including live fish shipped in tin cans.

To breed stock for his Baltimore Gold Fish Company, Bishop established a facility in Lakeland, a new subdivision near College Park, Maryland. The site featured a large lake and four surrounding ponds, all of which he stocked with goldfish. At its peak, this facility shipped more than one million goldfish annually, and his Baltimore Sun obituary described it as possibly the largest goldfish operation in the world. He expanded to other states with more goldfish farms. Bishop's business supplied complete aquatic ecosystems, offering custom aquariums, aquatic plants, ornaments, and fish food. His client list included the National Zoo in Washington, D.C., the New York Aquarium, and Luna Park in Pittsburgh.

Beyond his commercial success, Henry Bishop was a tireless advocate for a public zoo in Baltimore. He played a foundational role in establishing the zoological garden in Druid Hill Park by personally donating the animals that formed the core of its original collection. His contributions were so important that when the Baltimore Zoo opened in 1876, he was affectionately known as the "Father of the Baltimore Zoo". While Bishop continued to supply the zoo with animals for years, his ultimate ambition remained unfulfilled. He campaigned for decades to build a much larger "Great Zoo" for the city, but this grand vision never secured the necessary funding.

In 1886, Bishop authored and self-published an eclectic book that reflected his personality, bearing the long title: Bishop, The Bird Man's Book, on the Care and Management of Birds, Aquariums, Your Home and Yourself. This unusual volume offered readers advice on the care of birds and fish, but also home management and personal health. Woven among these instructional sections were Bishop's own autobiographical stories, songs, and poetry.

Bishop died at home in Baltimore on November 3, 1907, from an unspecified illness. He is buried at Loudon Park Cemetery. At the time of his death, his pet store business in Baltimore, Henry Bishop, Inc. at 12 N. Front Street, was one of the oldest operating in the country.

After his father's death, Henry Bishop Jr. (1874-1937) took over Henry Bishop, Inc. Around 1914, he opened a goldfish breeding operation at his home, an 18th-century rural property in Cockeysville, Maryland known as Shipleys Mill (also known as Beaver Dam Mill). There, he and his sister, Hermina Bishop Gill, raised and sold goldfish from numerous purpose-built ponds. Hermina continued the business after her brother's death in 1937, but she died in 1939, and the family lost the mill in a 1941 legal dispute. Meanwhile, it is uncertain when the original Lakeland ponds stopped breeding goldfish; however, by 1914, the ponds were being used by the federal government to raise bass for stocking local rivers and lakes. A 1915 government report noted the "remarkable rate of growth" of the bass and attributed it to the goldfish.
