= Jakarta Aquarium =

Aquarium in Indonesia

Jakarta Aquarium and Safari
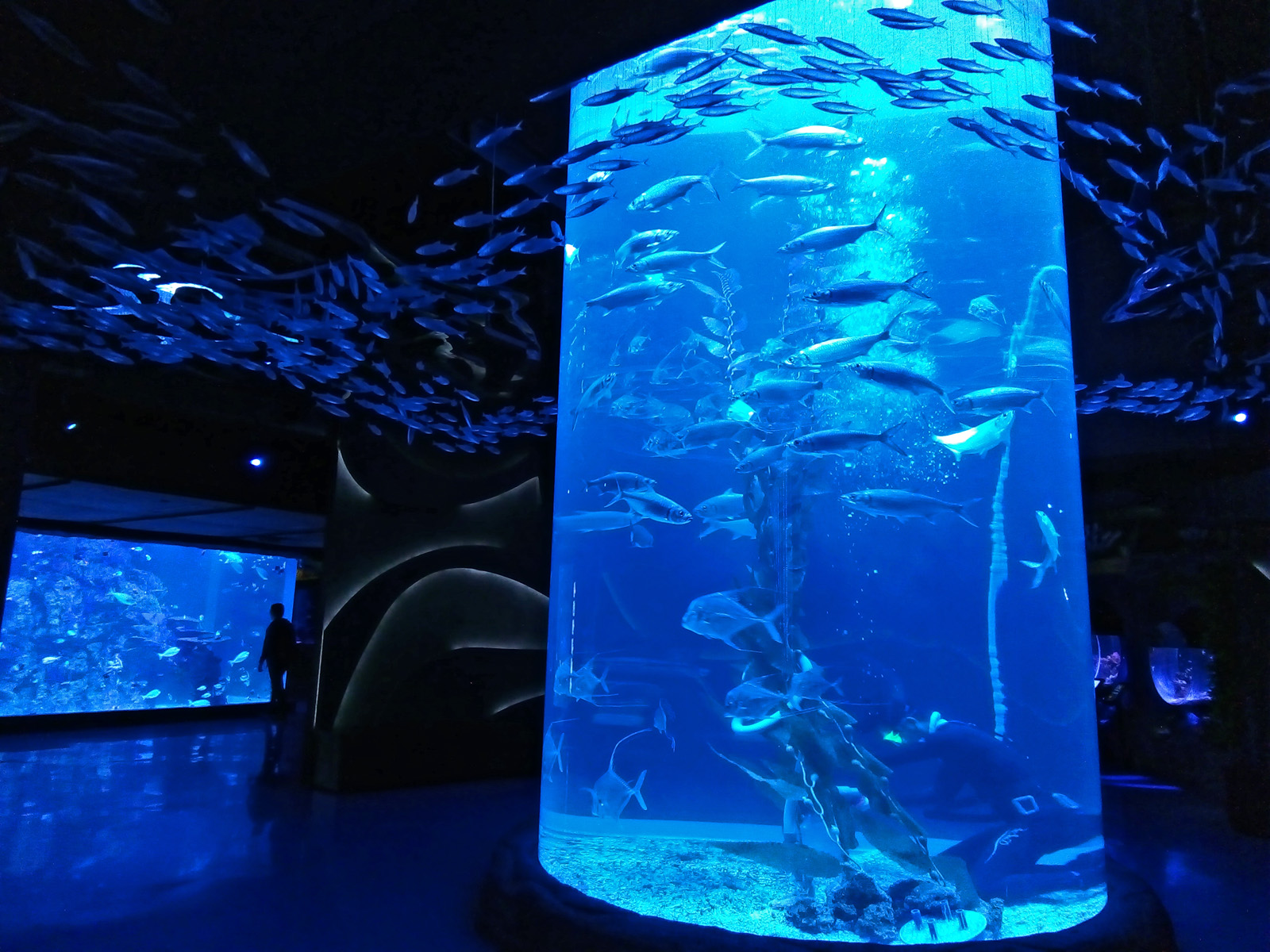
- Jakarta aquarium, 2018
- Interactive map of Jakarta Aquarium and Safari
- 6.175112°S 106.789987°E
- Date opened: October, 2017
- Location: Podomoro City, Jakarta, Indonesia
- Land area: 7,200 m^{2} (78,000 ft^{2})
- No. of animals: 14,000
- No. of species: 600
- Owner: Taman Safari & Aquaria KLCC
- Website: www.jakarta-aquarium.com

Jakarta Aquarium and Safari is a marine and freshwater aquarium located within a retail and leisure complex Neo Soho in Jakarta, Indonesia. The aquarium is home to hundreds of mammal, reptile, insect and various types of Indonesian marine fish.

Other than Indonesian endemic animals, there are also animals from Africa and South America. The aquarium is a subsidiary of Taman Safari of Indonesia in collaboration with Aquaria KLCC of Malaysia. The Aquarium has received the accolade of Trip Advisor's Certificate of Excellence Destination 2018 and Indonesia Travel Tourism Awards (ITTA).

== Zones ==
The aquarium have nine zones, which displays various species.

=== Diving Deep ===
==== Soft coral tank ====
- Bowtie damselfish
- Yellowtail damselfish
- Ocellaris clownfish
- Speckled sandperch

==== Anemone tank ====
- Bluestreak cleaner wrasse
- Rockmover wrasse
- Tomato clownfish
- Nosestripe anemonefish
- Clark's anemonefish

==== Hard coral tank ====
- Banded cleaner shrimp
- Yellowtail damselfish
- Sailfin tang
- Pacific regal blue tang

=== Islands of Indonesia ===
==== Otter exhibit ====
- Asian small-clawed otter

==== Serval exhibit ====
- Denison barb
- Nile tilapia
- Koi
- Serval

=== Rainforest of Indonesia ===
Guests can take a picture with a blue-and-yellow macaw and a reticulated python. An interactive booth is also present, where guests can touch a ]es and red-eyed crocodile skinks. Special exhibits are also present, with Forsten's tortoises, Indonesian blue-tongued skinks, and a red tegu that can be petted by guests.

==== Squirrel exhibit ====
- Prevost's squirrel

==== Owl house ====
- Pacific barn owl

==== Iguana exhibit ====
- Green iguana

==== Axolotl tank ====
- Axolotl

==== Insectarium ====
- Mexican redknee tarantula
- Asian forest scorpion

==== Paludarium ====
- Blind cave fish
- Peters's elephantnose fish

==== Snake-necked turtle exhibit ====
- Climbing perch
- Three spot gourami
- Northern snake-necked turtle

==== Poison dart frog exhibit ====
- Golfodulcean poison frog
- Blue poison dart frog
- Dyeing poison dart frog

==== Agamid lizard exhibit ====
- Chameleon forest dragon

==== Meerkat exhibit ====
- Meerkat

==== Binturong exhibit ====
- Javan binturong

==== Capuchin exhibit ====
- Tufted capuchin

==== Insectarium and Herpetarium ====
- Sumatran stick insect
- Leopard gecko
- Emerald green skink
- Australian green tree frog
- Malaysian orchid mantis

=== Nursery of the Sea ===
==== Mangrove tank ====
- Black sea cucumber
- Mangrove horseshoe crab
- Banded archerfish

==== Seashore tank ====
- Live sharksucker
- Silver moonyfish
- Crescent banded grunter
- Barred flagtail
- Milkfish
- Spotted sicklefish
- Snubnose pompano
- Cobia
- Flapnose ray
- Ocellated eagle ray
- Cowtail stingray
- Jenkins' whipray
- Mangrove whipray
- Common shovelnose ray

==== Shallow tank ====
- Mangrove horseshoe crab
- Bluespotted ribbontail ray
- Bristle-tail filefish
- Milkfish
- Whitespotted bamboo shark
- Brownbanded bamboo shark

=== Swirls and Jewels ===
==== Cylindral tank ====
- Indo-Pacific tarpon

==== Outer reef tank ====
- Indo-Pacific sergeant
- Redbelly yellowtail fusilier
- Sailfin tang
- Orange-spine unicornfish
- Latticed butterflyfish
- Pennant coralfish
- Foxface rabbitfish
- Redcoat
- Barred soapfish
- Talang queenfish
- John's snapper
- Dusky batfish
- Laced moray

==== Sea urchin tank ====
- Long-spined sea urchin
- Gilbert's cardinalfish
- Banggai cardinalfish
- Latticed butterflyfish

==== Coral reef tank ====
- Picturesque dragonet
- Threespot dascyllus
- Maroon clownfish
- Flame angelfish

==== Shrimp tank ====
- Squat shrimp
- Ocellaris clownfish
- Messmate pipefish
- Yellowbanded pipefish

==== Eeltail catfish tank ====
- Striped eel catfish

==== Batfish tank ====
- Spotted hawkfish
- Ribbon eel
- White ribbon eel
- Dusky batfish

==== Sea horse tank ====
- Sand sifting starfish
- Tiger tail seahorse
- Alligator pipefish

==== Moray eel tank ====
- Snowflake moray
- Zebra moray
- Barred moray

==== Circular tank ====
Guests can enter a hollow space in the middle of the tank through a tunnel where they have to crawl in.

- Spotted-gill cardinalfish
- Pacific regal blue tang
- Dark-banded fusilier
- Emperor angelfish

==== Garden eel tank ====
- Splendid garden eel
- Spotted garden eel
- Banded pipefish
- Razorfish

==== Lionfish tank ====
- Milk-spotted pufferfish
- Clearfin lionfish
- Common lionfish
- Estuarine stonefish

==== Seadragon tank ====
- Weedy seadragon

=== Touch and Find ===
Guest could touch several species of fishes and starfish in the touch pool, such as chocolate chip sea star, bluespotted ribbontail ray, whitespotted bamboo shark, and brownbanded bamboo shark. An aquarium is also present containing bamboo shark eggs, where guest can learn about the shark's embryo development.

==== Threadfish tank ====
- Torpedo scad
- Indian threadfish

==== Seafloor tank ====
- Giant isopod

==== Spiny lobster tank ====
- Scalloped spiny lobster

==== Cardinalfish tank ====
- Blue bat star
- Half-barred cardinal
- Spotted-gill cardinalfish
- Pajama cardinalfish

=== River of Indonesia ===
==== Paludarium ====
- Black tetra
- Rosy barb
- Freshwater angelfish
- Hybrid cichlid (Blood parrot cichlid x convict cichlid)

==== Waterfall tank ====
- Amazon sailfin catfish
- Redtail catfish
- Hybrid catfish (Tiger sorubim x redtail catfish)
- Tucanare peacock bass
- Blue peacock bass
- Jullien's golden carp
- Giant gourami
- Pirapitinga
- Silver arowana
- Asian arowana
- Great tapah

==== Sturgeon tank ====
- Amazon sailfin catfish
- Saddled bichir
- Bala shark
- Tinfoil barb
- Hampala barb
- Malayan mahseer
- Iridescent shark
- Siberian sturgeon
- Pig-nosed turtle
- Malaysian giant turtle

==== Tigerfish tank ====
- Bigtooth river stingray
- Florida gar
- Payara
- Goliath tigerfish

==== Piranha Cave ====
- Red-bellied piranha

==== Jellyfish Magic ====
- White-spotted jellyfish
- Indonesian sea nettle

The zone also include a tank for upside-down jellyfish, torpedo scad, and Indian threadfish. Two deep sea-themed tanks are also present, one is for eyelight fish and popeye catalufas, while the second is for longspine snipefish and Japanese pineapplefish.

=== Southern Sea ===
- Yellowfin surgeonfish
- Streaked spinefoot
- Snubnose pompano
- Golden trevally
- Bigeye trevally
- Giant trevally
- Brown-marbled grouper
- Ocellated eagle ray
- Cowtail stingray
- Reticulate whipray
- Common shovelnose ray
- Zebra shark
- Tawny nurse shark
- Whitetip reef shark
- Blacktip reef shark
- Green sea turtle

== See also ==
- Sea World Ancol
