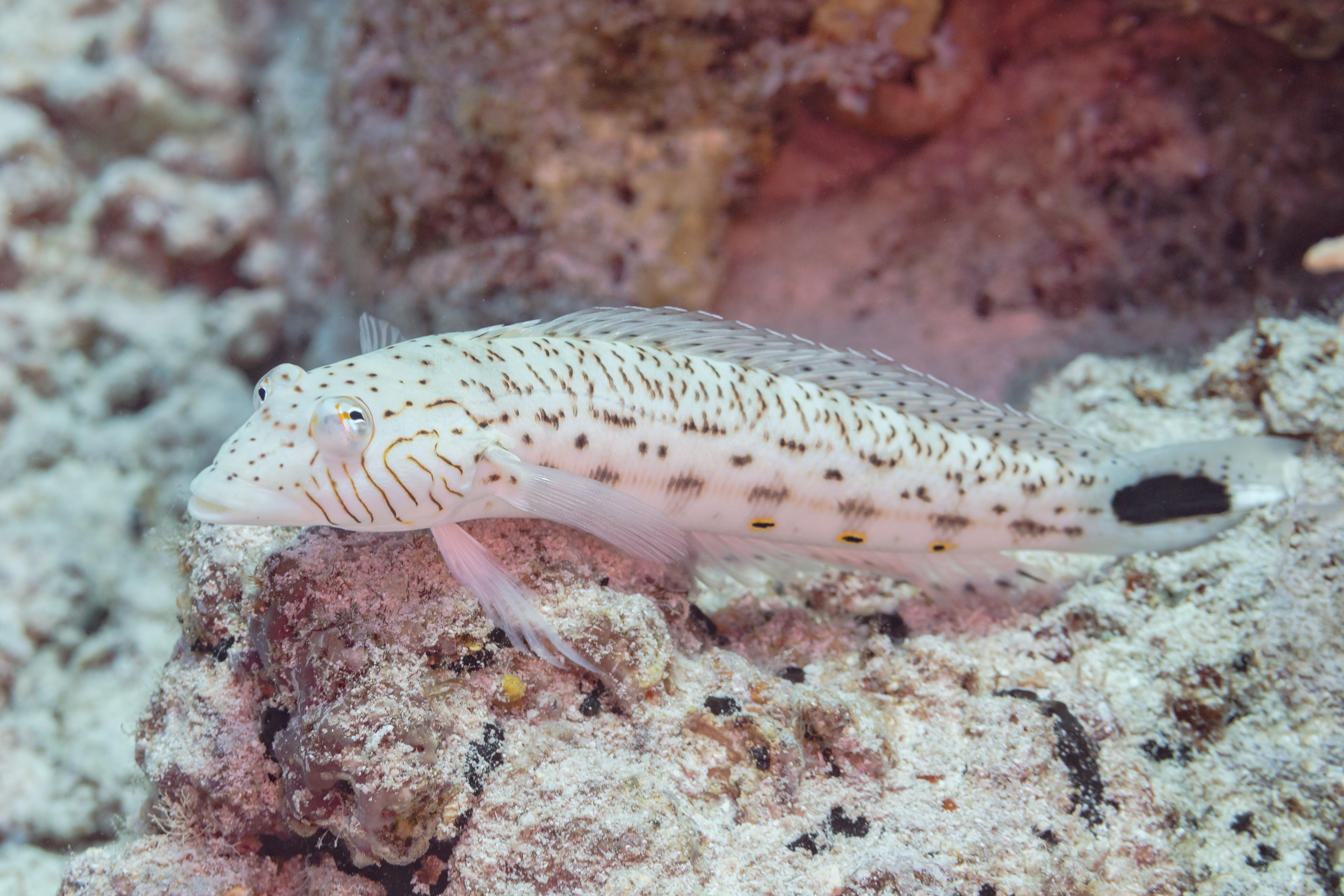

Conservation status
- Least Concern (IUCN 3.1)

Scientific classification
- Kingdom: Animalia
- Phylum: Chordata
- Class: Actinopterygii
- Order: Labriformes
- Family: Pinguipedidae
- Genus: Parapercis
- Species: P. hexophtalma

Binomial name
- Parapercis hexophtalma (Cuvier, 1829)

Synonyms
- Parapercis hexophthalama (Cuvier, 1829); Parapercis hexophthalma (Cuvier, 1829); Parapercis polyophtalma (Cuvier, 1829); Parapercis polyophthalma (Cuvier, 1829); Parapercis polyopthalma (Cuvier, 1829); Parapercis polyphtalma (Cuvier & Valenciennes); Percis hexophtalma Cuvier, 1829; Percis hexophthalma Cuvier, 1829; Percis polyophthalma Cuvier, 1829

= Parapercis hexophtalma =

Species of ray-finned fish

Parapercis hexophtalma, the speckled sandperch, is a species of marine ray-finned fish in the family Pinguipedidae, found in the western Indo-Pacific Ocean. It was first described by the French naturalist Georges Cuvier in 1829. There are several synonyms, some of which represent misspellings of the original name, and others which were given to female fish, at the time thought to be a separate species.

== Description ==
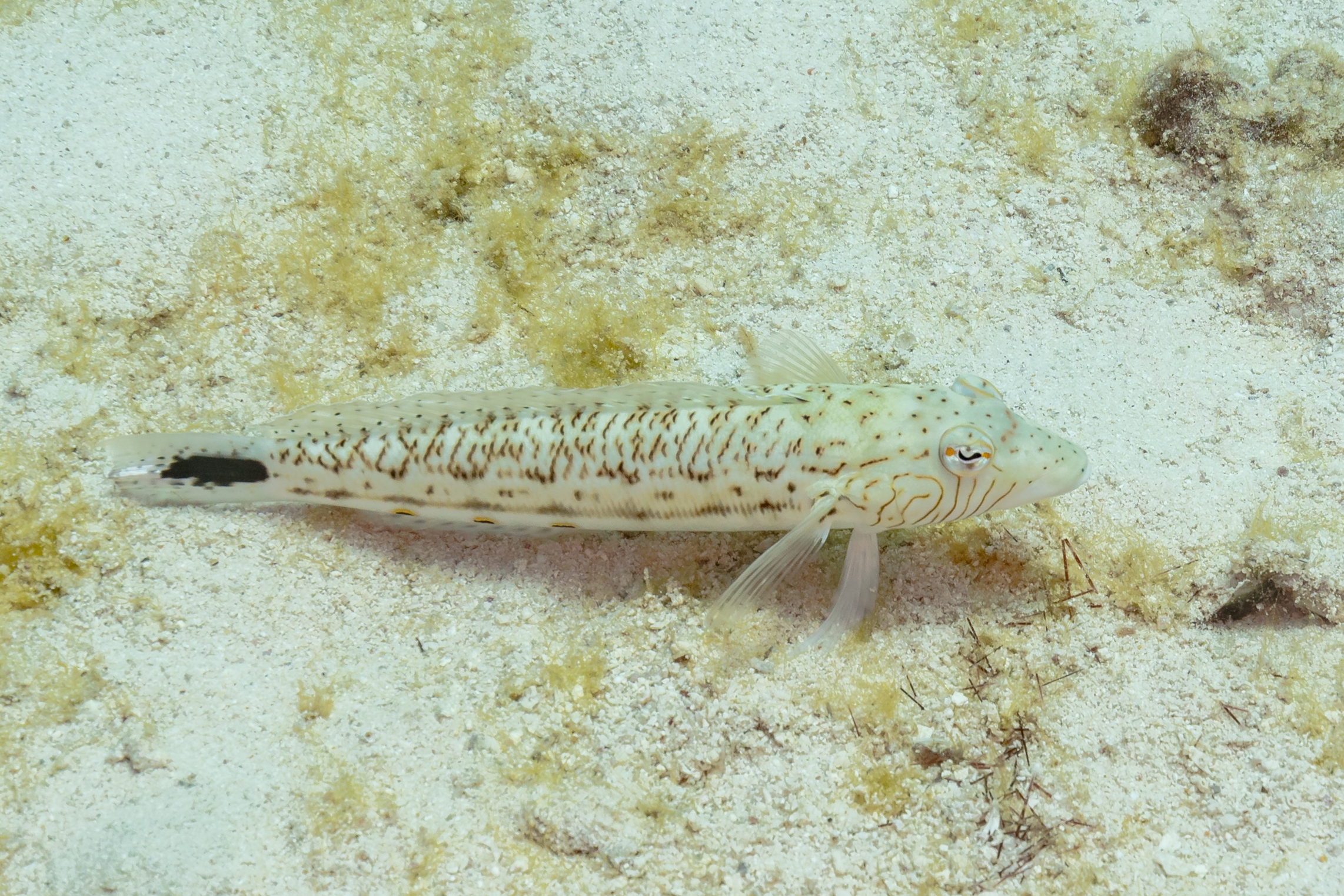
Parapercis hexophtalma (male)

The speckled sandperch grows to a length of around 28 cm (11 in) and is about five times as long as the body is deep. The anterior (front) end of the body is cylindrical and the posterior end is somewhat flattened. The eyes are rather close together on the top of the head and the fish rests on the seabed, propping itself up with its widely separated pelvic fins. The dorsal fin has five spines and 21 or 22 soft rays, and the anal fin has a single spine and 17 or 18 soft rays.

The dorsal surface of the fish is greenish dappled with dark brown, the flanks are pale grey and the underparts white. There is a lateral row of large white spots each with one or more small black spots in the middle. On the underparts there are further black spots, mostly edged with yellow. Females have brown spots on the head and males have diagonal yellowish-brown markings on the cheek. The dorsal fin has a black spot at the base of the spines and the caudal fin, which is rounded or has a short extension from the upper lobe, has a larger black spot. There are several rows of small black spots on the soft rays of the dorsal fin and one row on the anal fin.

== Distribution ==
The speckled sandperch is found in shallow waters on the east coast of Africa as far south as Natal, the Red Sea and the western Indo-Pacific. Its range extends as far east as Sumatra, and includes the Maldives, the Laccadives and Sri Lanka. The type location is the Red Sea. Although its range was originally thought to extend as far east as Fiji, three new species of Parapercis were recognised in 2007 based on their number of fin rays, their colouration and markings, and the location and number of spots on their anal fins; Parapercis pacifica occurs from southern Japan to the Timor Sea, Parapercis queenslandica from northern Australia, and Parapercis xanthogramma from Fiji, Tonga and Western Samoa. The speckled sandperch generally occurs on sandy or rubble substrates in areas sheltered by reefs.

== Biology ==
The speckled sandperch is a predator and feeds on small crustaceans and other invertebrates, also taking small fish.

Several members of the family Pinguipedidae are protogynous hermaphrodites, starting their adult life as females and changing sex to males later, and this is the case with the speckled sandperch. Not only do the fish change sex, but they also change their markings at the same time. The sexual inversion occurs at a length of about 18 cm (7 in). Male fish are territorial and defend a harem of females. The eggs are planktonic and larval development takes place during one to two months.
