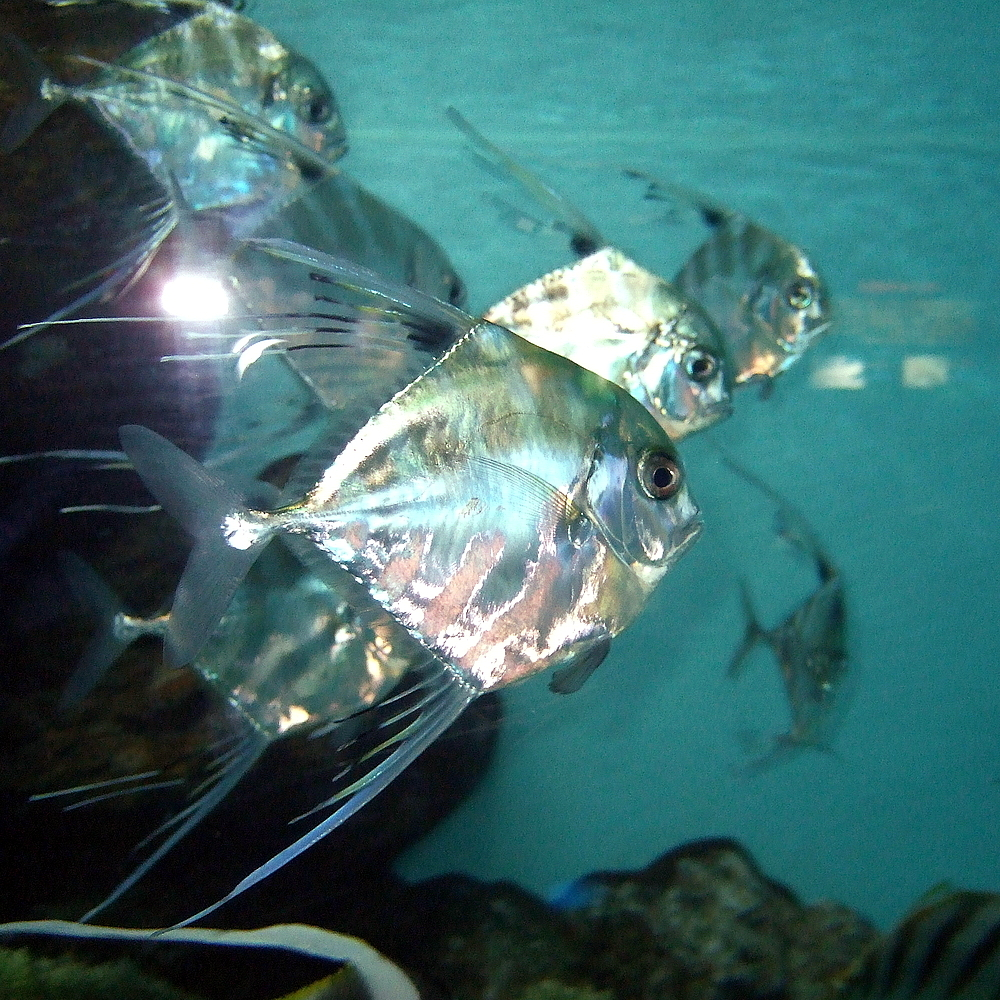
- juvenile Alectis ciliaris

Scientific classification
- Kingdom: Animalia
- Phylum: Chordata
- Class: Actinopterygii
- Division: Teleostei
- Order: Carangiformes
- Suborder: Carangoidei
- Family: Carangidae
- Subfamily: Caranginae
- Genus: Alectis; Rafinesque, 1815

Type species
- Alectis ciliaris (Bloch, 1787)

Species
- See Text

Synonyms
- Gallus (Lacépède, 1802); Scyris (Cuvier, 1829)

= Alectis =

Alectis Temporal range: 55–0 Ma Eocene to Present

Genus of fish

Alectis is a genus of fish in the family Carangidae containing three extant species, all of which are large marine fishes. They are commonly known as threadfish, diamond trevallies or pompanos, although they have no close affiliation with the true pompano genus.

== Taxonomy ==
Alectis is one of 33 genera in the jack and horse mackerel family Carangidae. The Carangidae are ray-finned fishes in the order Carangiformes.

The first fish in the genus to be described was Alectis ciliaris under the genus name of Zeus, part of the dory family. Lacépède recognized the species was not a dory and assigned it to a new genus, Gallus, however this was preoccupied by a bird. In 1815, Rafinesque proposed the name Alectis in an obscure publication. Georges Cuvier used another generic name, Scyris, for the genus in 1829, but the name Alectis was rediscovered by James Douglas Ogilby in 1913 and had priority. The name Alectis is derived from one of three Erinyes in the Greek mythology; daughter of Acheronte with a terrible rage.

A single species has been identified the fossil record, Alectis simus (Stinton, 1979), from the Eocene period of England. It was found alongside a number of extinct and extant carangid genera including Caranx and Usacaranx (extinct).

== Species ==
There are currently three recognized species in this genus:

Image	Scientific name	Common name	Distribution
	Alectis alexandrina (É. Geoffroy Saint-Hilaire, 1817)	Alexandria pompano	tropical eastern Atlantic Ocean, inhabiting the waters of West Africa from Morocco around to Angola
	Alectis ciliaris (Bloch, 1787)	African pompano	east and west coasts of the US, South America and Africa, throughout the Indian Ocean and along Asia and Australia, as well as many islands in the Pacific.
	Alectis indica (Ruppell, 1830)	Indian threadfish	the tropical regions of the Indian and Western Pacific Oceans, ranging from Madagascar, east Africa and the Red Sea to India, China, South East Asia, north to Japan and south to Indonesia and northern Australia

== Biology ==
The fish of the genus are large, powerful fishes that look very similar to a number of other large jacks, with the main difference being the profile of the head and the characteristic long filamentous anal and dorsal fins displayed by juveniles of these species. They are generally a silver colour, with pale green to hyaline fins. A. indica is the largest of the genus, growing to a reported 165 cm and 25 kg in weight.

The genus has a circum-tropical distribution, with adults generally restricted to reefs in coastal areas down to 100 m, while juveniles are often pelagic. All three are predators of small fishes, cephalopods and crustaceans. A little is known of their reproductive habits and larval phases, with spawning occurring during daylight between pairs.

== Relationship to humans ==
The genus is of minor importance to both commercial and subsistence fisheries, with the species generally not numerous enough to warrant a specific fishery. All species are considered fine game fish, attaining large sizes and capable of blistering runs. The flesh of the genus is generally considered very good for culinary purposes, although at least one species has been implicated in a case of Ciguatera poisoning. In Singapore, A. indica has successfully been bred in aquaculture for food production in relatively low numbers. Juveniles are occasionally used in saltwater aquariums, noted for their filamentous anal and dorsal fins.
