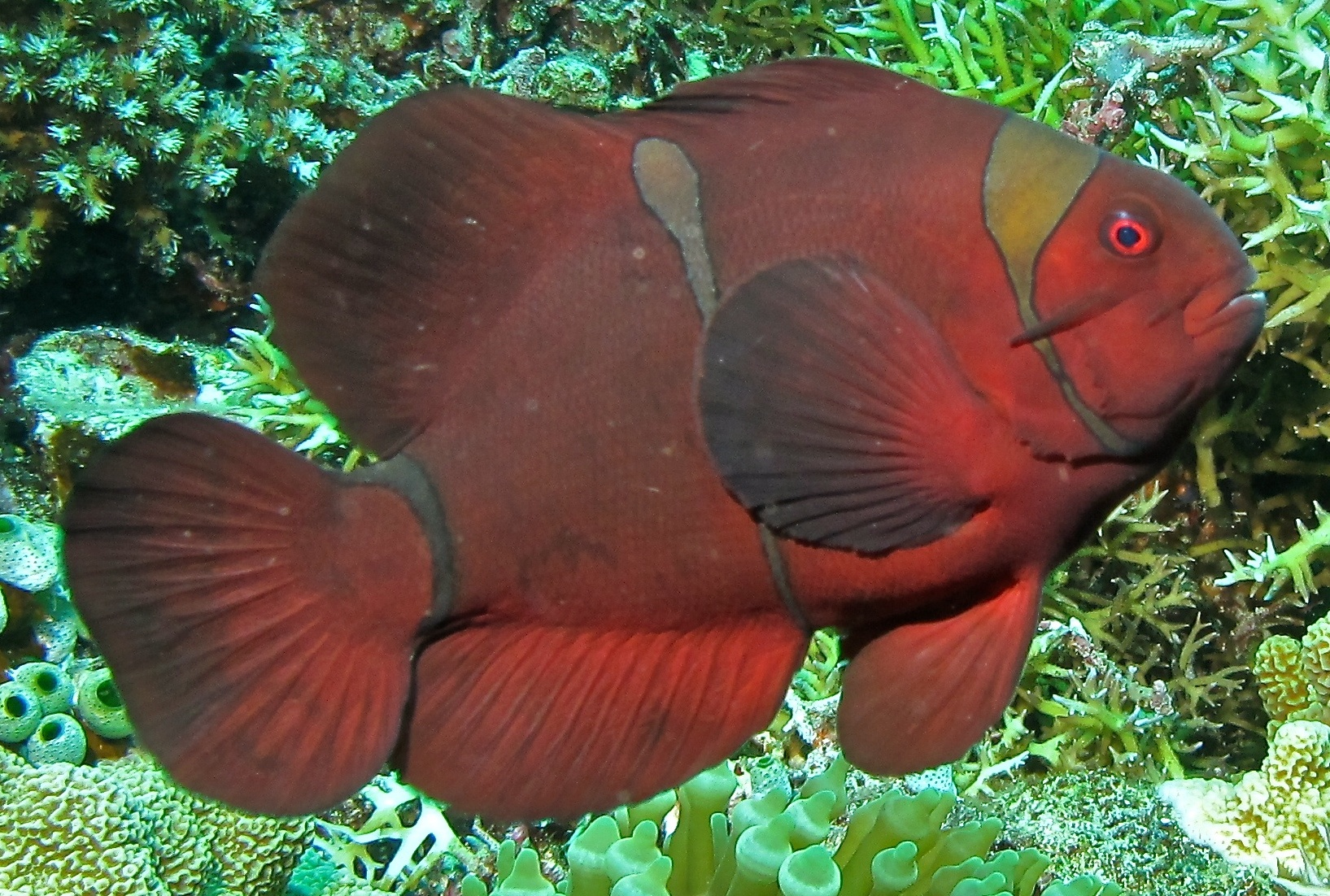

Conservation status
- Least Concern (IUCN 3.1)

Scientific classification
- Kingdom: Animalia
- Phylum: Chordata
- Class: Actinopterygii
- Division: Teleostei
- Order: Blenniiformes
- Family: Pomacentridae
- Genus: Amphiprion
- Species: A. biaculeatus

Binomial name
- Amphiprion biaculeatus (Bloch, 1790)

Synonyms
- List: Chaetodon biaculeatus Bloch, 1790; Premnas biaculeatus (Bloch, 1790); Lutianus trifasciatus Schneider, 1801; Holocentrus sonnerat Lacépède, 1802; Premnas unicolor Cuvier, 1829; Premnas semicinctus Cuvier, 1830; Sargus ensifer Gronow, 1854; Premnas gibbosus Castelnau, 1875; Premnas epigrammata? Fowler, 1904

= Maroon clownfish =

Species of fish

Amphiprion biaculeatus, commonly known as spine-cheeked anemonefish or the maroon clownfish, is a species of anemonefish found in the Indo-Pacific from western Indonesia to Taiwan and the Great Barrier Reef. They can grow up to be about 17 cm (6.7 in).

Like all anemonefishes it forms a symbiotic mutualism with sea anemones and is unaffected by the stinging tentacles of the host anemone. It is a sequential hermaphrodite with a strict size-based dominance hierarchy; the female is largest, the breeding male is second largest, and the male nonbreeders get progressively smaller as the hierarchy descends. They exhibit protandry, meaning the breeding male changes to female if the sole breeding female dies, with the largest nonbreeder becoming the breeding male. The fish's natural diet includes algae and zooplankton.

== Taxonomy ==
A. biaculeatus was once the only species of the genus Premnas. Historically, anemonefish have been identified by morphological features and color pattern in the field, while in a laboratory, other features such as scalation of the head, tooth shape, and body proportions are used. The namesake spine on the cheek of the fish was the characteristic that distinguished the genus Premnas from the closely related Amphiprion. A. biaculeatus has been thought to belong to a monospecific lineage (and its own clade), but genetic analysis has shown that it is closely related to A. percula and A. latezonatus.

Genetic analysis suggests A. biaculeatus is monophyletic with Amphiprion, closely related to A. ocellaris and A. percula. This would make Premnas a synonym of Amphiprion, and this was committed to in 2021, where an expansive phylogenetic analysis of the damselfishes reclassifies the maroon clownfish from the monotypic genus Premnas to a junior synonym of Amphiprion. The species name remains unchanged, thus the maroon clownfish is now Amphiprion biaculeatus.

The taxon "P. epigrammata" from Sumatra probably should be recognized as a distinct species, Amphiprion epigrammata (Fowler, 1904). The recent precedents of the recognition of A. barberi as a distinct species from A. melanopus and A. pacificus being distinguished from A. akallopisos demonstrate the need to show not only geographic and morphological differences, but also genetic data to confirm the separation of the proposed species.

== Description ==
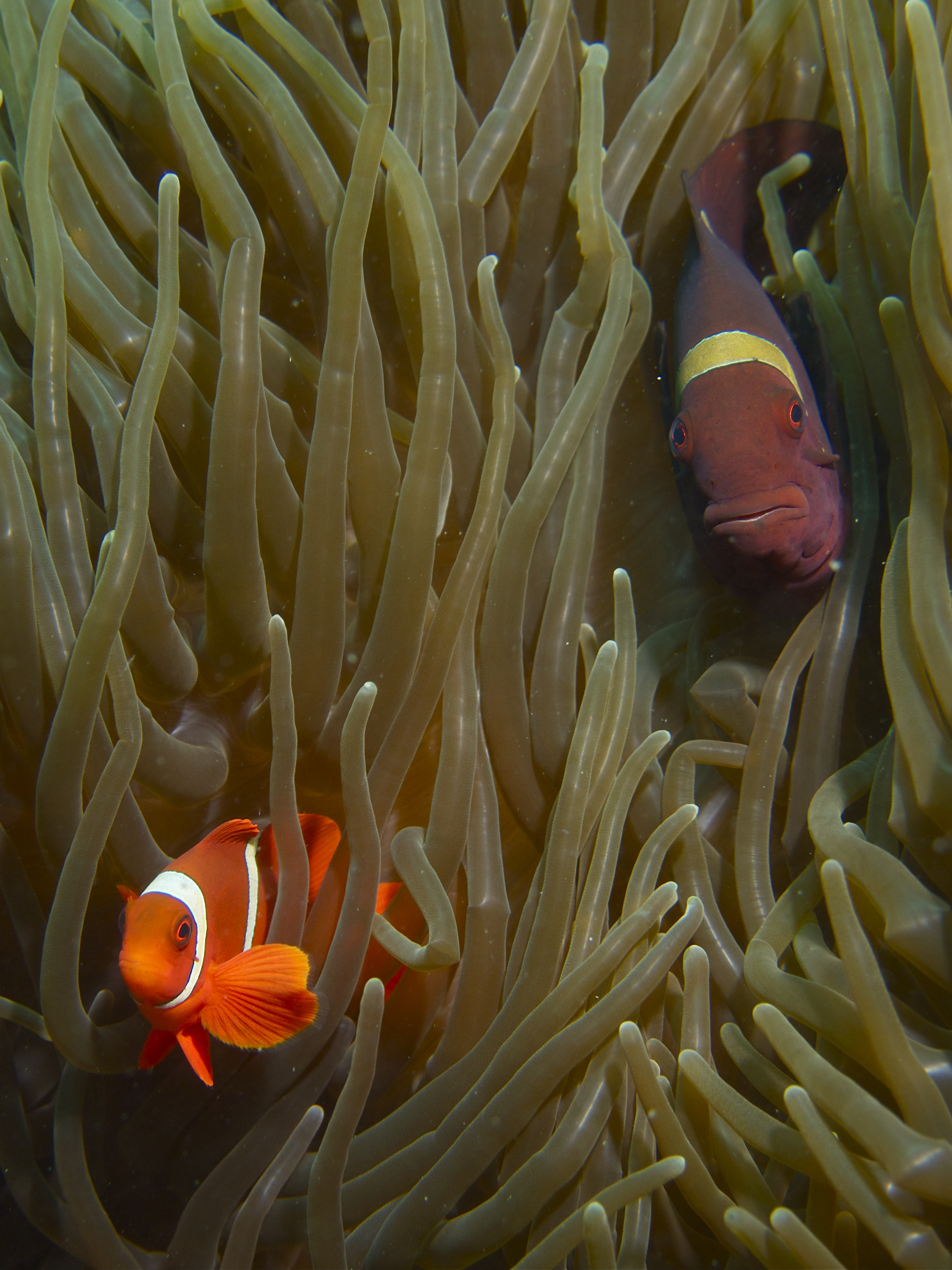
The male is much smaller than the female, with the female showing the dull-yellow "headband", at Apo Island (Philippines).

The characteristic that defines this genus is the spine on the cheek. The colors of the body and bars vary according to sex and geographic location. Despite the common name maroon clownfish, only some females have a maroon body color, with a range of color to dark brown. Juveniles and males are bright red-orange. The fish has three body bars which may be white, grey, or yellow. Where the female bars are grey, they can be "switched" rapidly to white if fish is provoked.

The size-based dominance hierarchy means in any group of anemonefish, the female is always larger than the male. A significant difference in size is seen in this species, with females being one of the largest anemonefish, growing up to 17 cm (6.7 in) while males are much smaller, usually being 6–7 cm (2.4–2.8 in).

=== Color variations ===
The significant color variations for fish in this species are related to sex and geographic location. Male and juvenile fish are bright red-orange which darkens on the fish changing to female, ranging from maroon to dark brown. The body bars of the female are narrower and the body bars reportedly all but disappear in older females. At least three geographic variations in the color of females are found, with fish from East Timor to Australia retaining white body bars. In the central Malay Archipelago, the head bar tends towards a dull yellow, with the other two body bars being grey. In Sumatra and Andaman Islands, all three body bars are yellow for both male and female, and the female body color can range from a dull maroon to a dark brown. While other species have a blue tinge to their body bars, Amphiprion chrysopterus and A. latezonatus, this geographic variety, is the only anemonefish to have yellow or gold body bars.

Central Malay Archipelago

The female in the Central Malay Archipelago, from North Sulawesi and the Philippines in the north to Komodo Island in the south, has a dull-yellow head bar and grey body bars. Male and juvenile fish are bright red-orange with white bars.

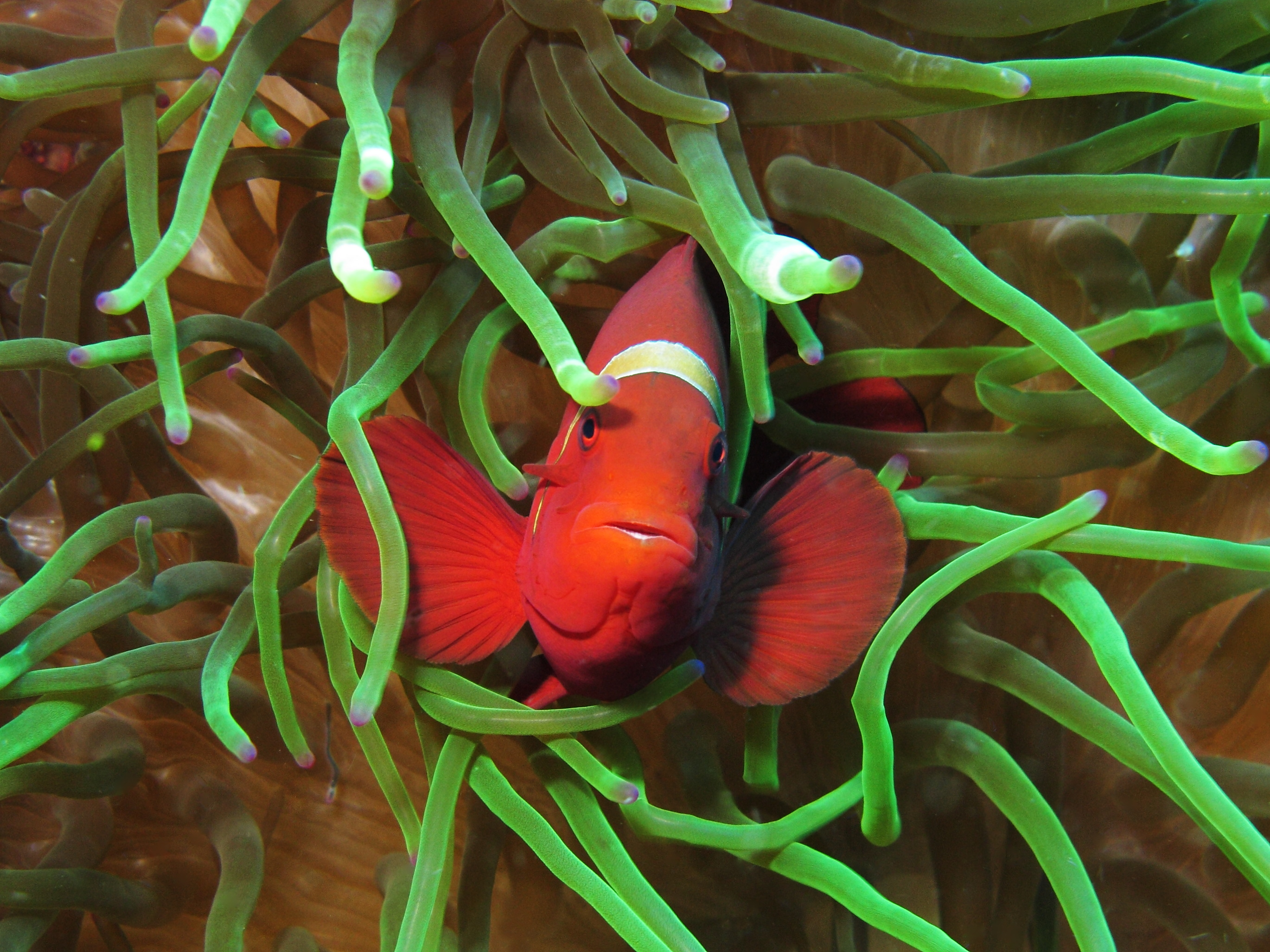
Female from Gilli Lawa Laut, near Komodo Island showing the gold tinged head bar and distinctive cheek spine

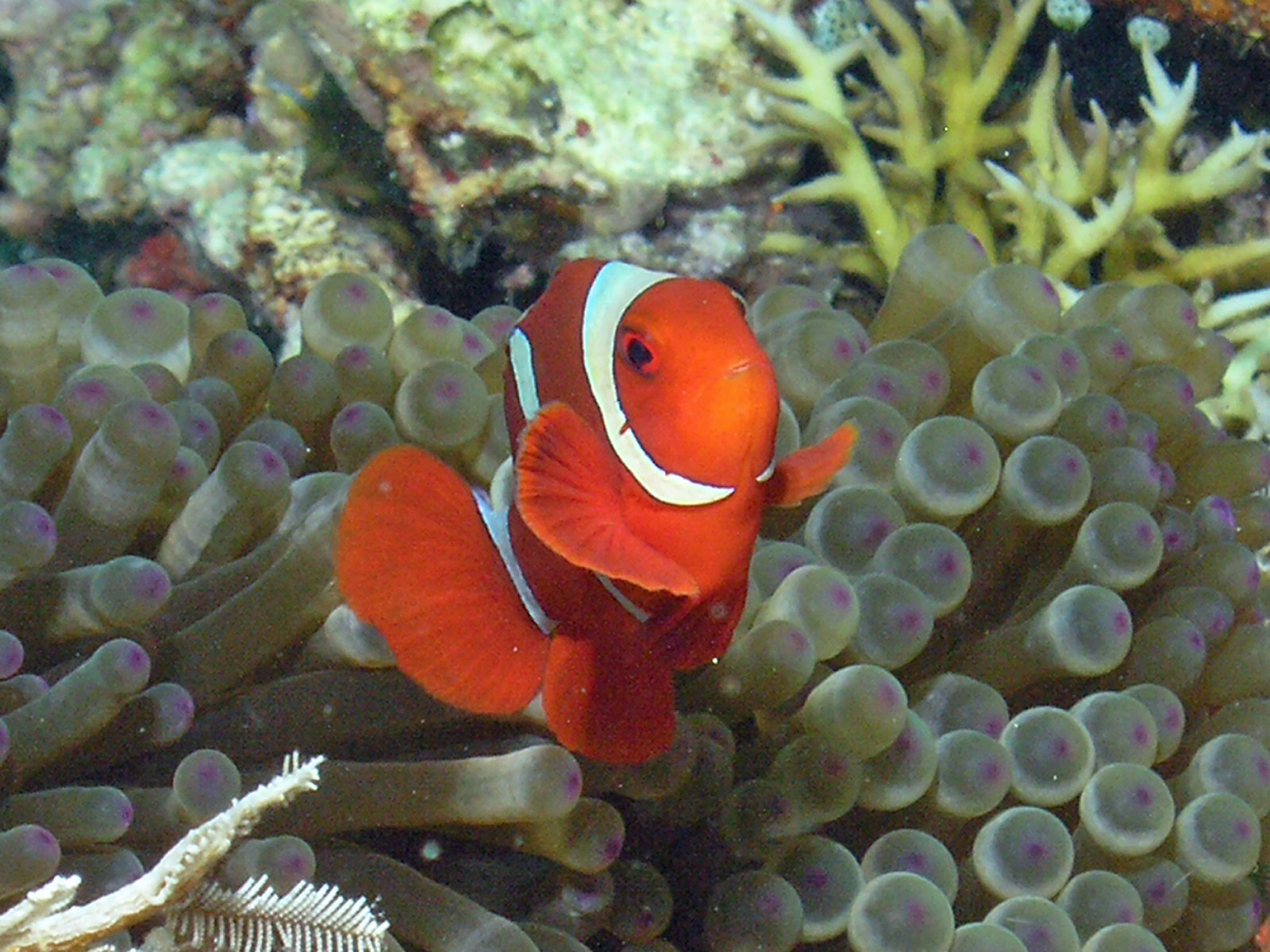
Male at Bunaken island, North Sulawesi, showing the bright red-orange colors and three white body bars

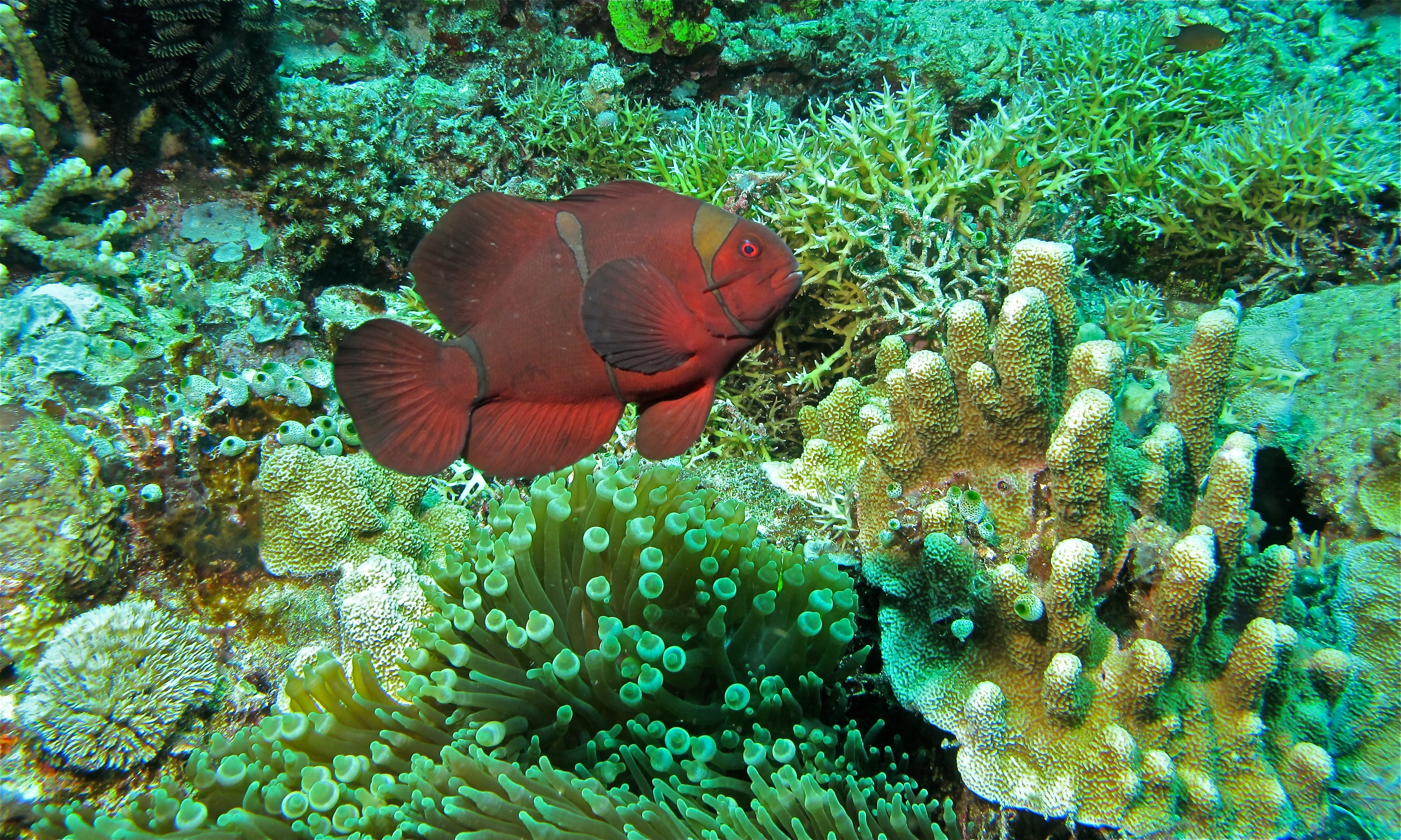
Female at Bunaken island, North Sulawesi, showing the dull-yellow head bar and grey body bars

East Timor to Australia

In the area from East Timor through New Guinea and Australia, the female has white or grey head and body bars. Male and juvenile fish are bright red-orange with white bars.

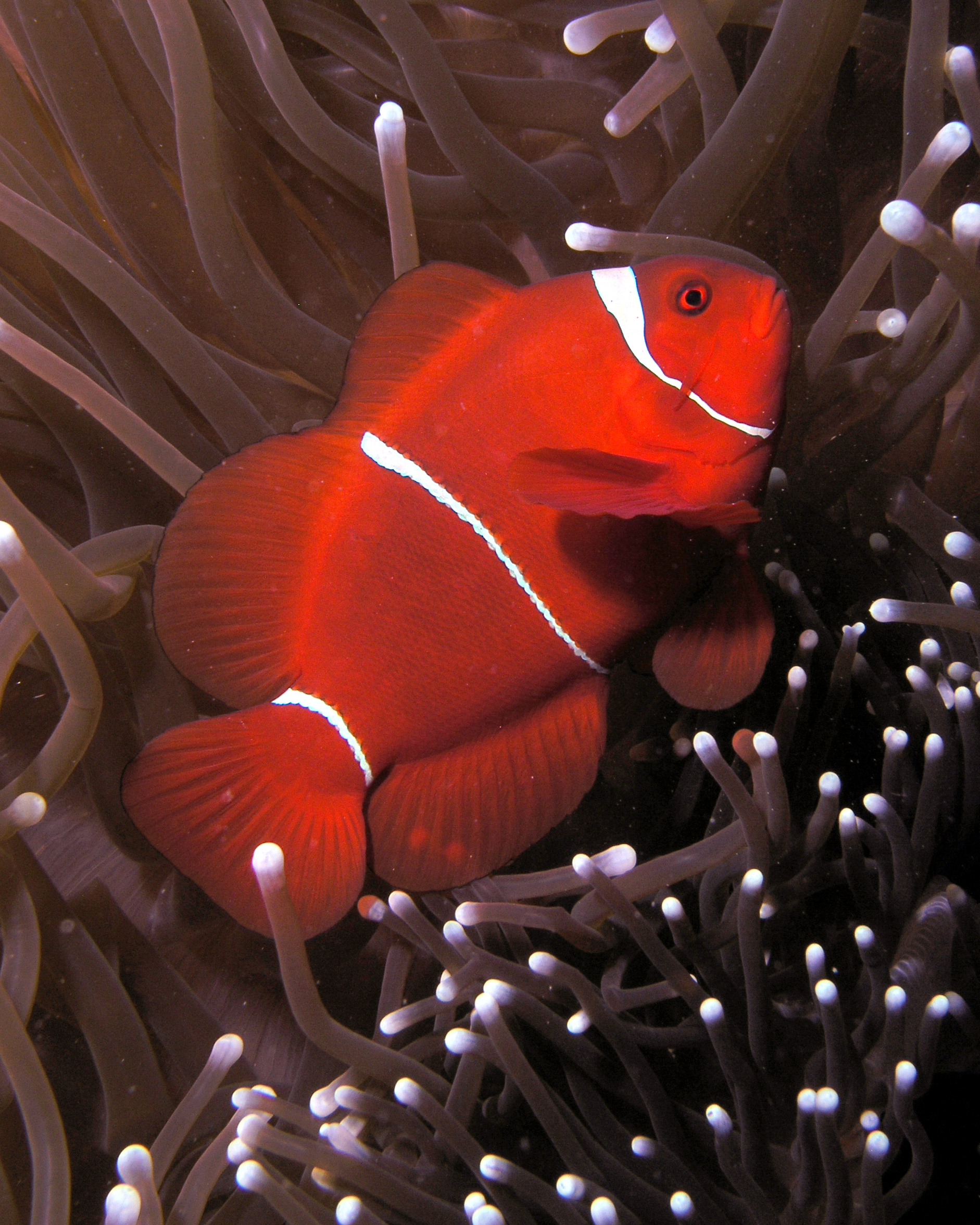
Female at East Timor showing the narrower body bars and maroon color

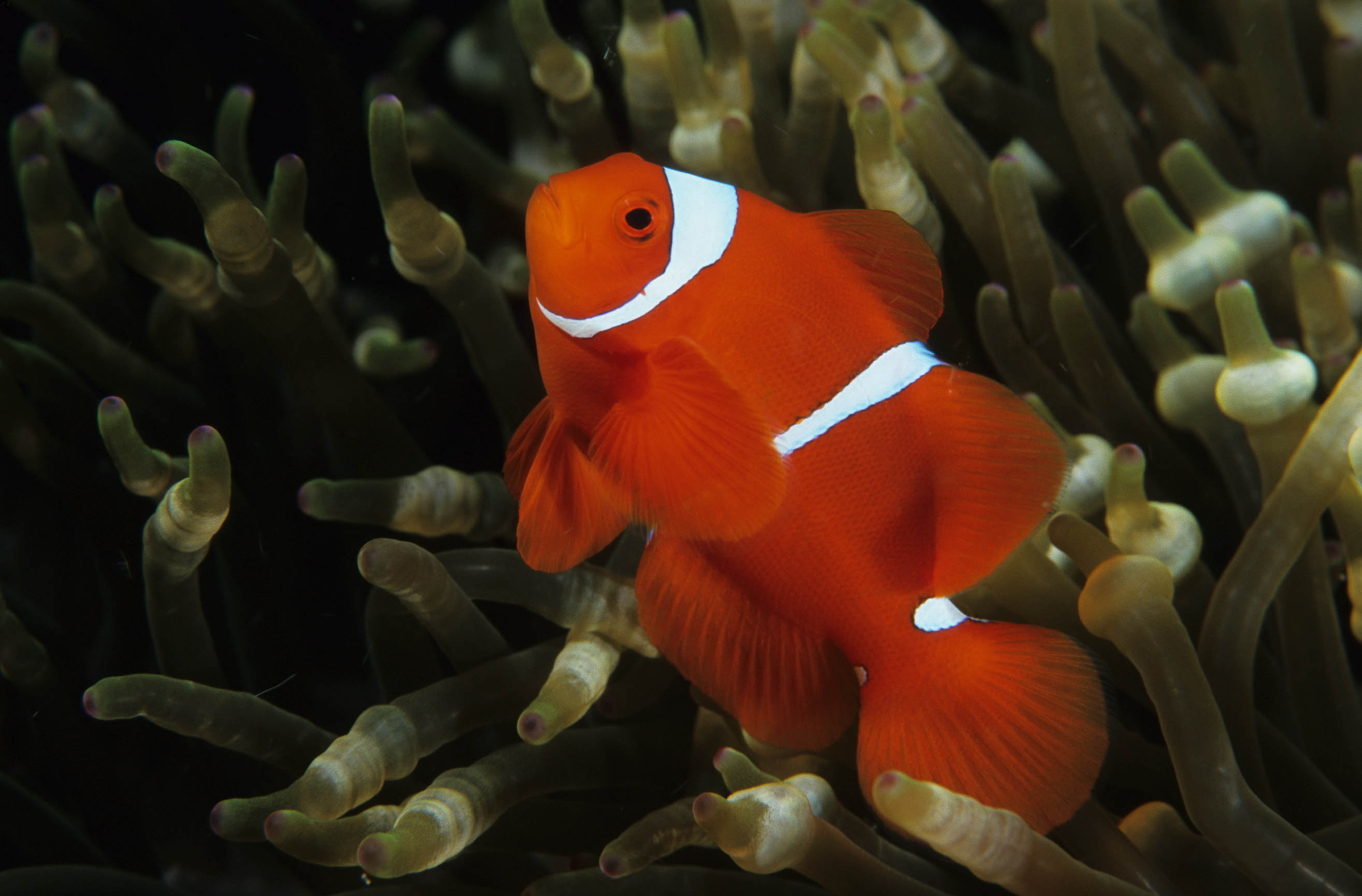
Male at East New Britain, PNG showing similar coloration to the male at North Sulawesi

Sumatra

Fish from Sumatra, the Andaman Islands, and Nicobar Islands have yellow body bars on both males and females. This distinctive feature meant they were previously considered a separate species.

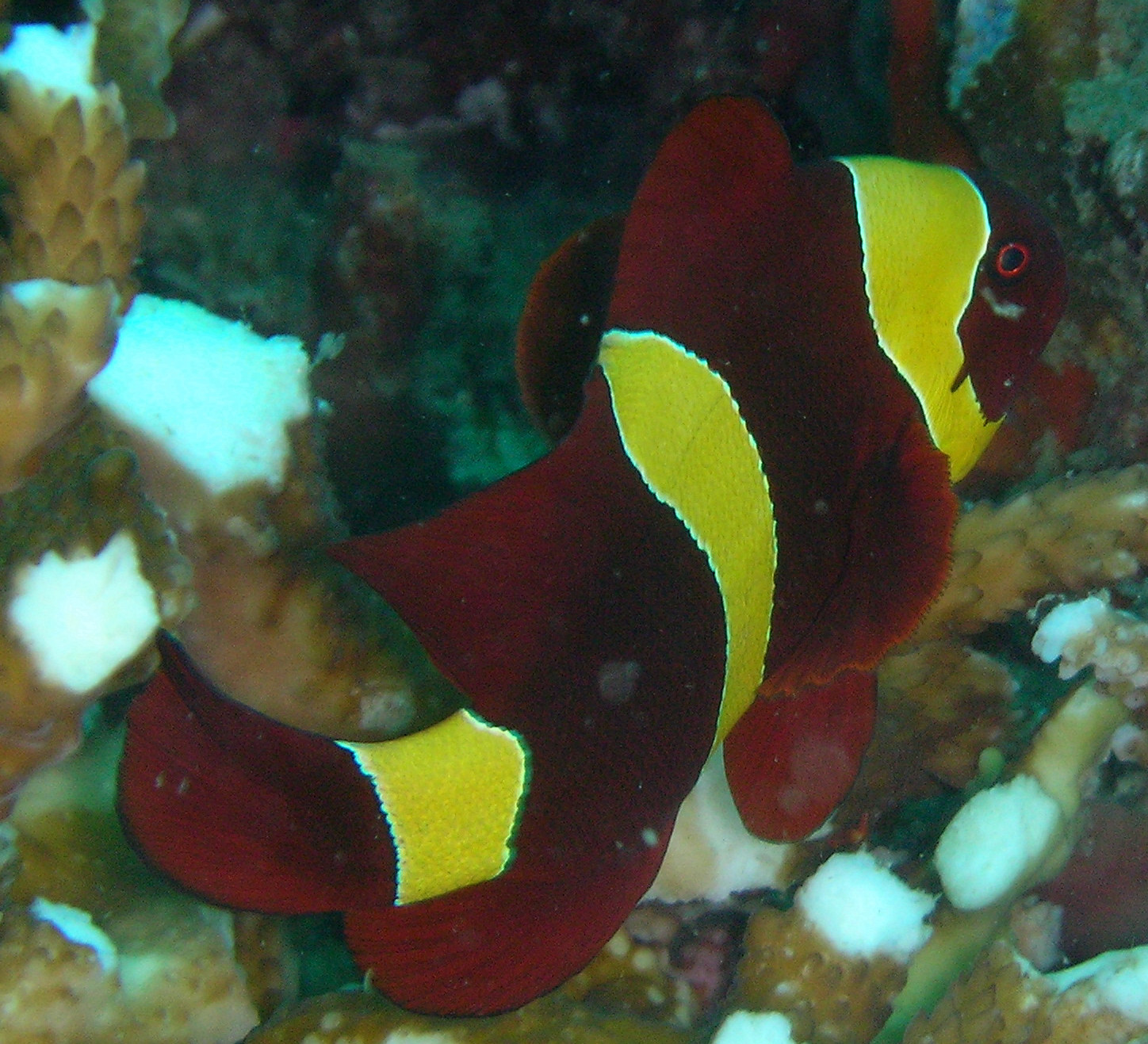
Female with striking gold body bars from the Andaman Islands

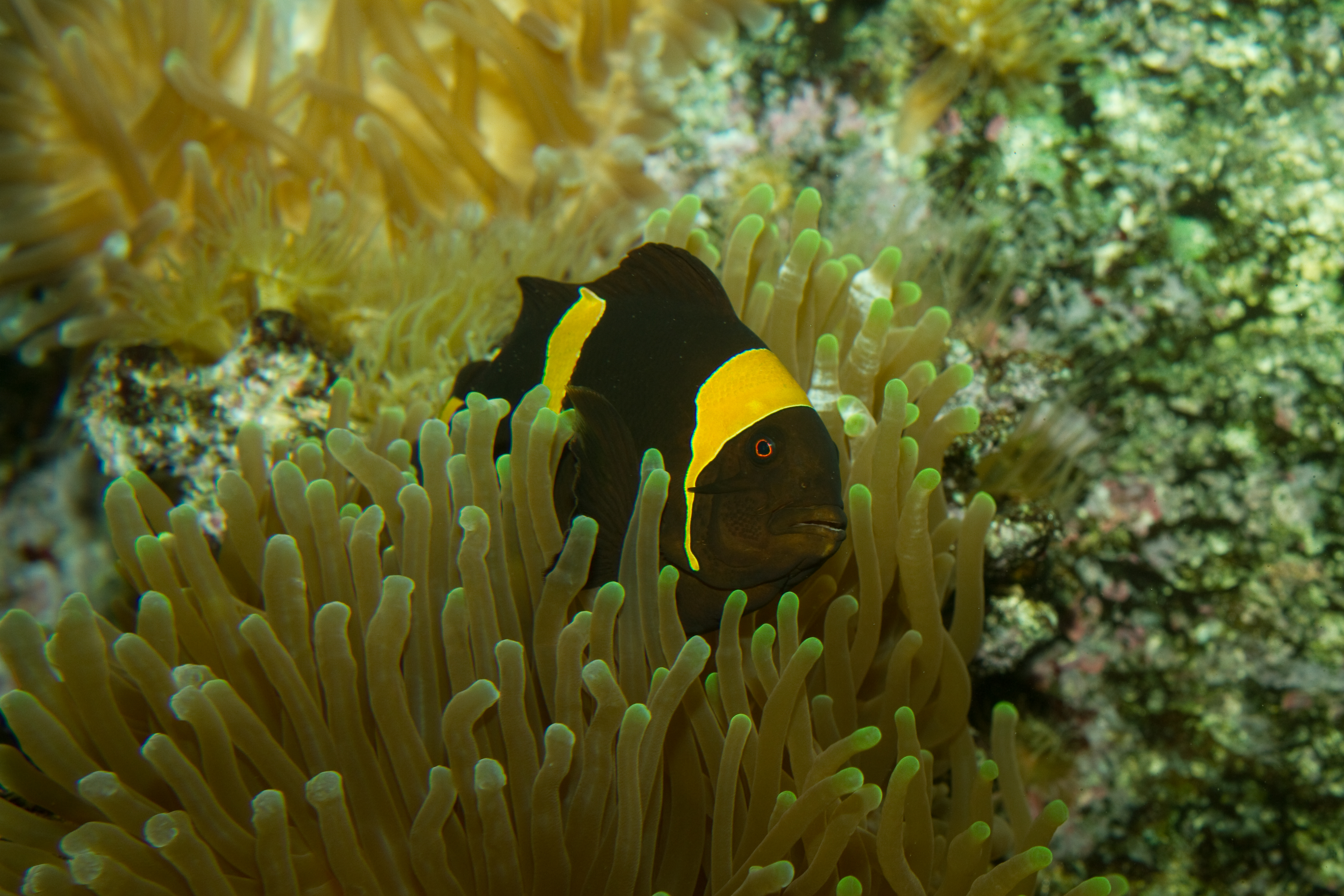
Female with gold body bars and dark brown body

== Distribution and habitat ==
A. biaculeatus is found in the Malay Archipelago and Western Pacific Ocean north of the Great Barrier Reef.

=== Host anemones ===
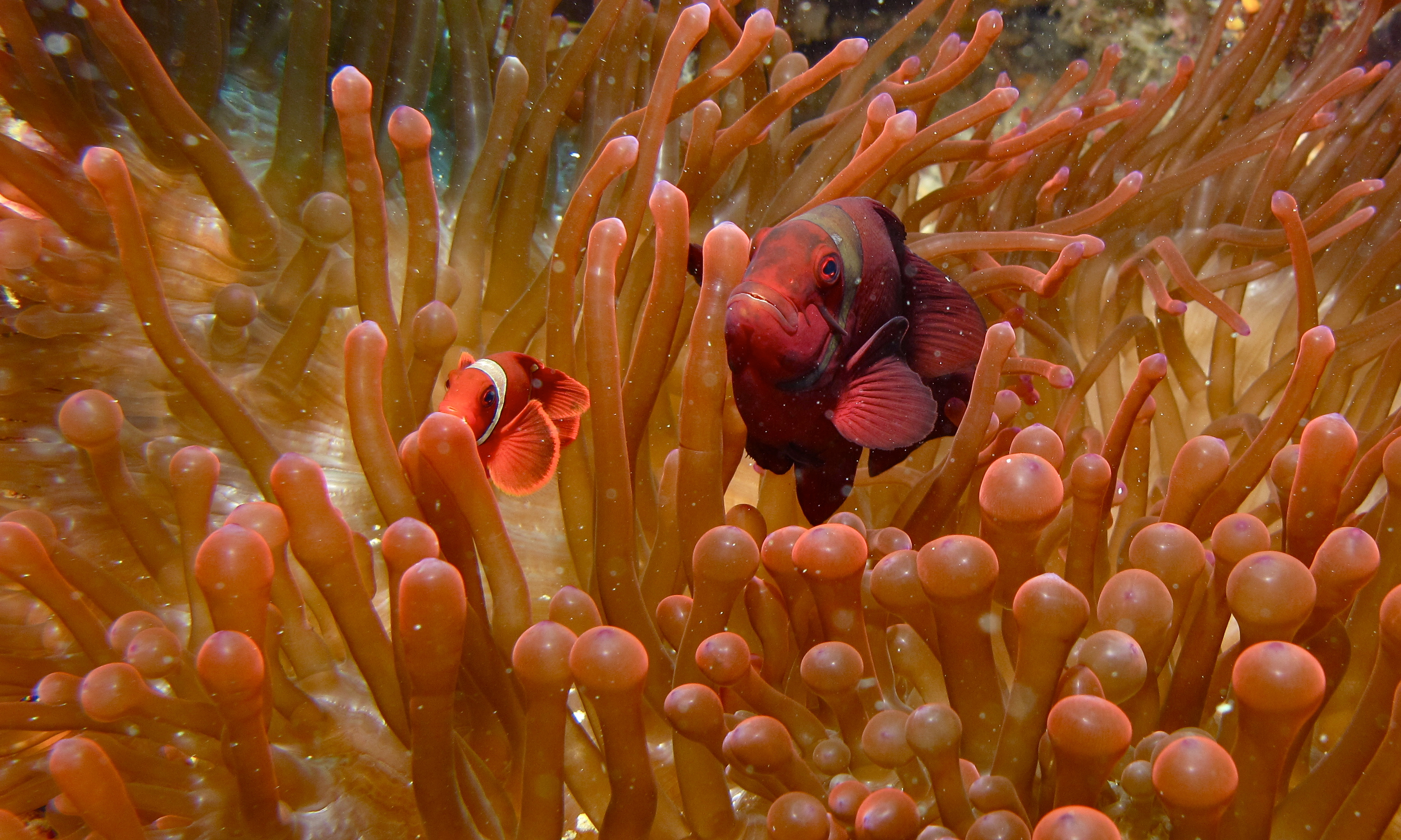
Pair sheltering in anemone, Malaysia

The relationship between anemonefish and their host sea anemones is not random and instead is highly nested in structure. A. biaculeatus is highly specialized with only one species anemone host, Entacmaea quadricolor or the bubble-tip anemone, predominantly with the solitary form. The fish chooses the host and one of the primary drivers for host selection is thought to be competition. E. quadricolor is highly generalist, hosting at least 14 species, around half of all species of anemonefish. With such competition, A. biaculeatus is considered to be the most territorial of all anemonefish. Competition alone, though, does not explain the preference of A. biaculeatus for the solitary form of E. quadricolor. As A. biaculeatus is the largest clownfish species and highly specialized towards a single host species, it can usually outcompete other clownfish species for use of E. quadricolor. Unlike many other clownfish species, it is usually found as a single mated pair, not in a hierarchical group. Although it almost exclusively uses E. quadricolor, there has also been one record of it recruiting on Heteractis crispa in Madang, Papua New Guinea.

== In the aquarium ==
The fish has successfully bred in a home aquarium. Being one of the larger anemonefish and the most aggressive, these characteristics need to be accommodated in any aquarium setup.

=== Selective breeding ===
Amphiprion biaculeatus has been subject to selective breeding in captivity. One of the more prominent traits is the "lightning" morph which is characterized by broken, jagged white body bars that have a honeycomb appearance. One of the first times this trait was observed was in a wild-caught pair from Fisherman's Island near Port Moresby, Papua New Guinea.

=== Hybridization ===
The maroon clownfish has been successfully crossbred with A. ocellaris to create the hybrid named the "blood orange clownfish" by the Florida aquaculture company, Oceans, Reefs and Aquariums. The body of this hybrid more closely resembles A. ocellaris, but possesses a darker orange hue, grows larger, and has a more "fiery" temperament, features characteristic of its A. biaculeatus genes.

== Gallery ==
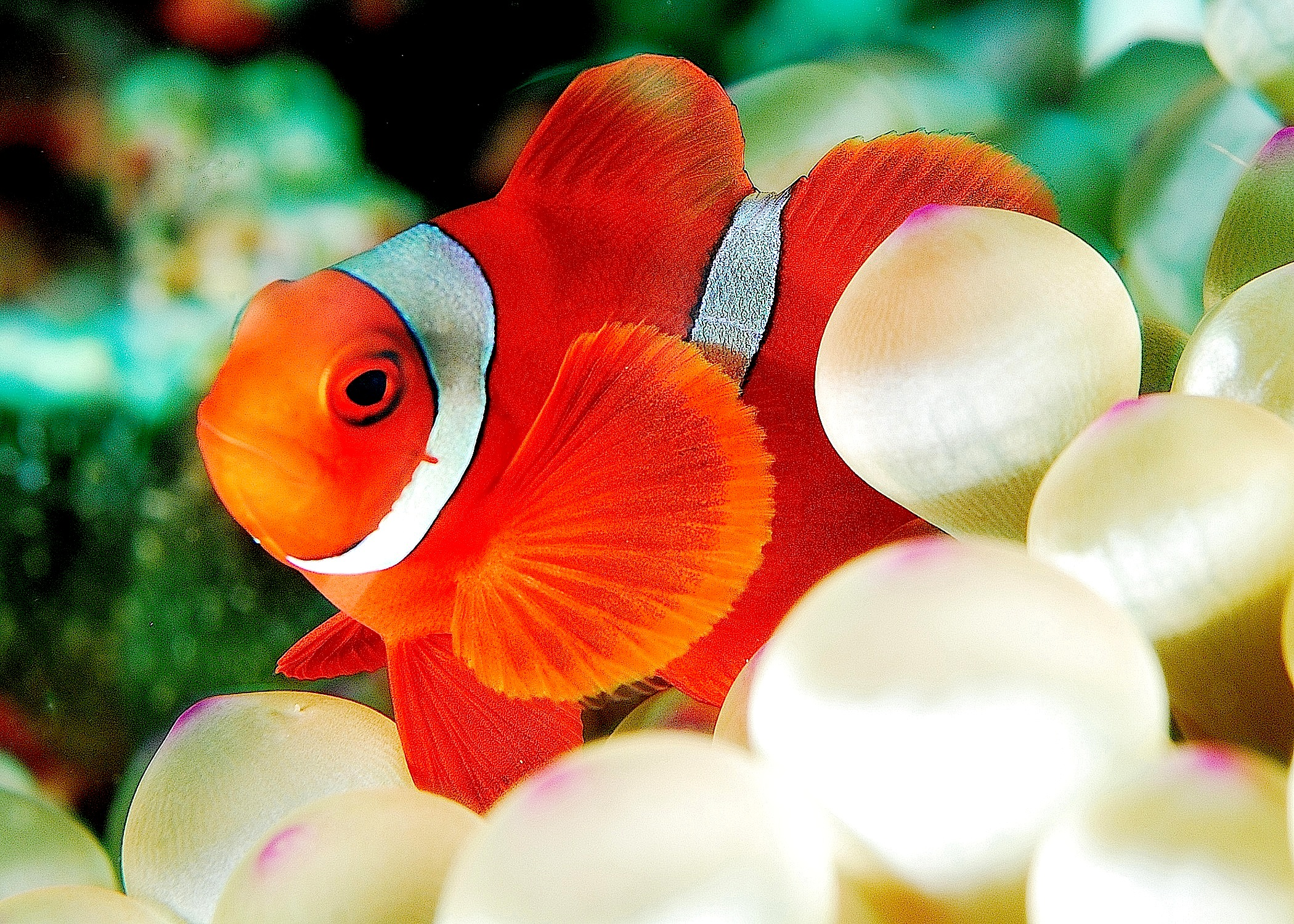
Maroon clownfish

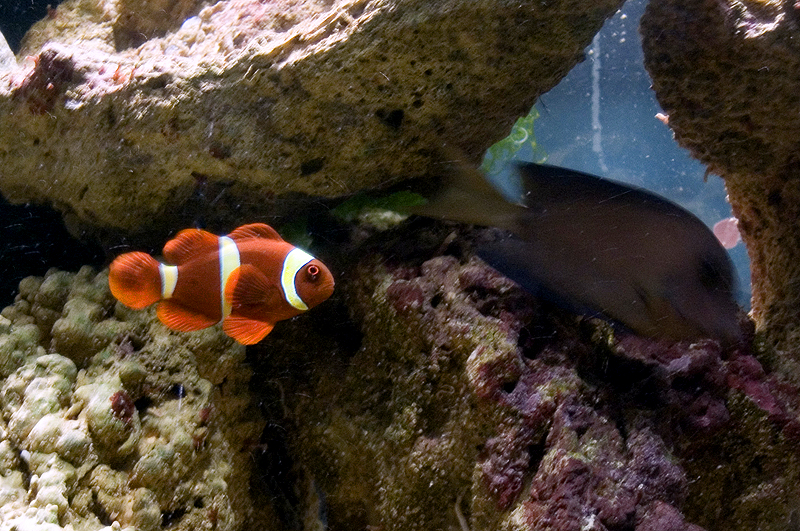
Maroon clownfish and a tang

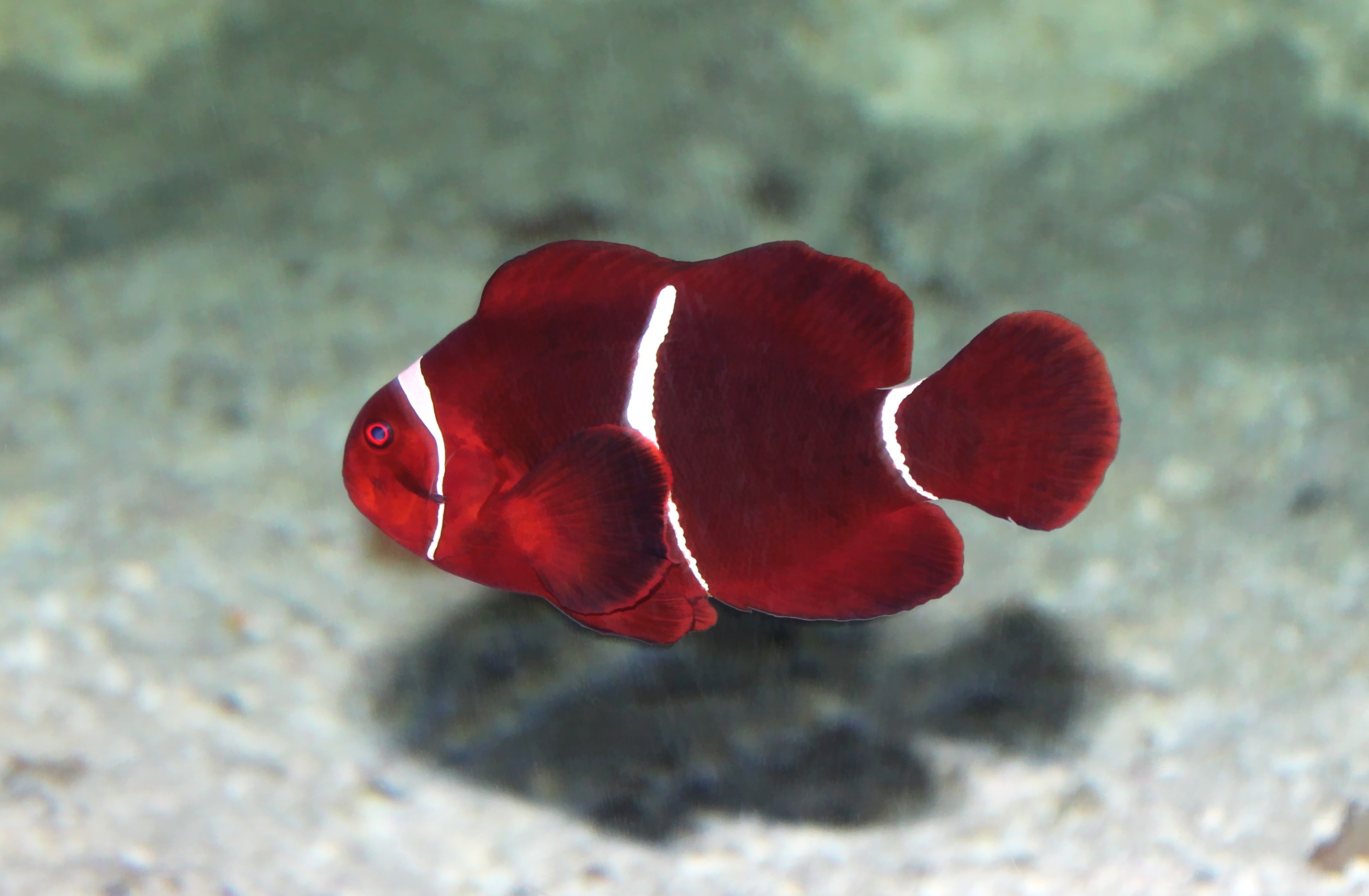
At the Vancouver Aquarium

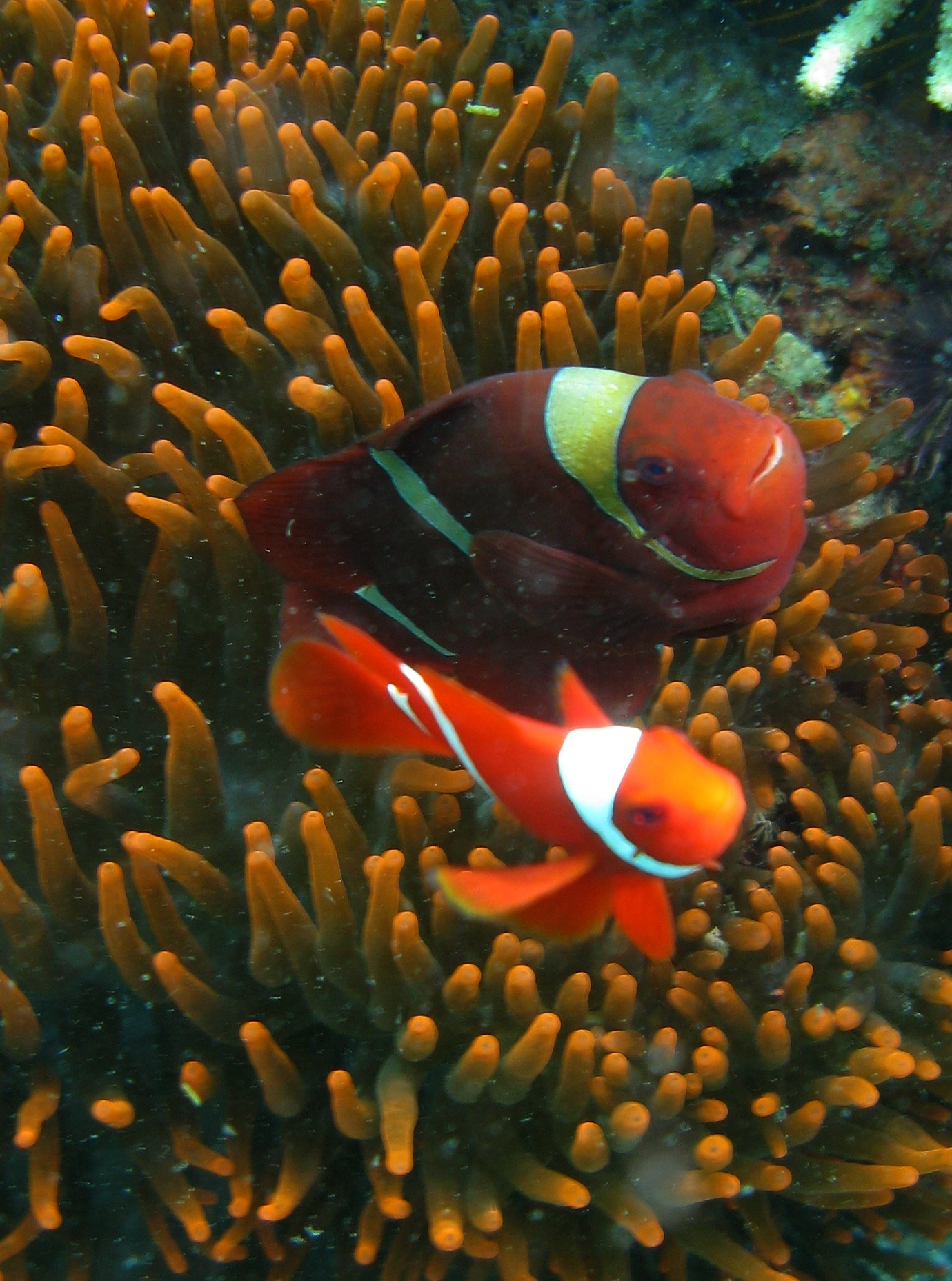
Pair in Indonesia
