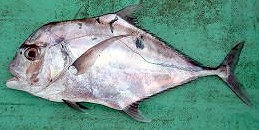

Conservation status
- Least Concern (IUCN 3.1)

Scientific classification
- Kingdom: Animalia
- Phylum: Chordata
- Class: Actinopterygii
- Order: Carangiformes
- Suborder: Carangoidei
- Family: Carangidae
- Genus: Alectis
- Species: A. ciliaris

Binomial name
- Alectis ciliaris (Bloch, 1787)
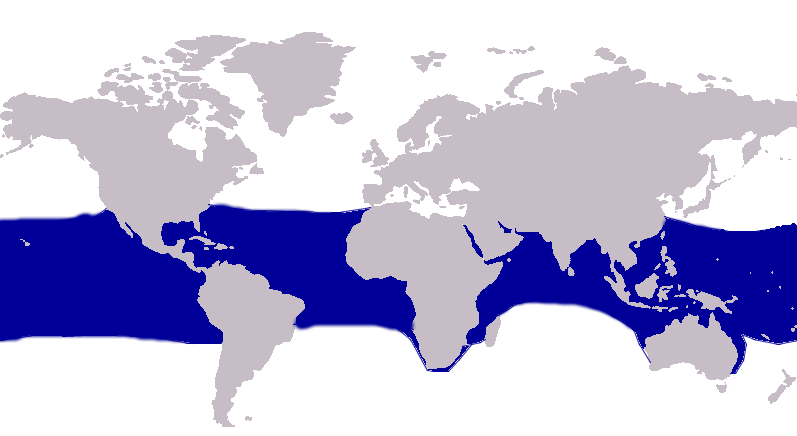
- Approximate distribution of the African pompano throughout the tropical oceans. Note that only juveniles are pelagic, with adults inhabiting coastal areas.

Synonyms
- List: Zeus gallus Linnaeus, 1758; Zeus ciliaris Bloch, 1787; Gallus virescens Lacépède, 1802; Alectis virescens Rafinesque, 1815; Zeus crinitus Mitchill, 1826; Alectis crinitus (Mitchill, 1826); Blepharichthys crinitus (Mitchill, 1826); Blepharis crinitus (Mitchill, 1826); Blepharis fasciatus Rüppell, 1830; Blepharis sutor Cuvier, 1833; Blepharis major Cuvier, 1833; Blepharis indicus Cuvier, 1833; Alectis indica (Cuvier, 1833); Hynnis cubensis Poey, 1860; Scyris analis Poey, 1868; Hynnis hopkinsi D.S. Jordan & Starks, 1895; Carangoides ajax Snyder, 1904; Caranx ajax (Snyder, 1904); Alectis temmincki Wakiya, 1924; Alectis breviventralis Wakiya, 1924

= African pompano =

Species of fish

The African pompano (Alectis ciliaris), also known as the pennant-fish or threadfin trevally, is a widely distributed species of tropical marine fish in the jack family, Carangidae. The species is found in tropical waters worldwide, with adults often inhabiting coastlines, while juveniles are usually pelagic, floating with ocean currents. The adult African pompano is similar in appearance to the other members of the genus Alectis, with the concave shape of the head near the eyes; the clearest distinguishing feature. The juveniles are similar to other members of Alectis, having long, filamentous dorsal and anal fin tips which are thought to discourage predators. The species lives in depths less than 100 m, consuming a range of crustaceans and small fishes. The species is of minor economic importance, often taken amongst other tropical midwater fishes by hook and line, while juveniles are occasionally caught in beach seines. African pompano are also highly rated game fish, often considered one of the strongest of the jacks in larger sizes.

== Taxonomy and naming ==
The Alectis ciliaris is one of three members of the diamond trevally genus Alectis, which itself is one of 33 genera in the jack and horse mackerel family Carangidae. The Carangidae are part of the order Carangiformes. This species is the type species for the genus Alectis.

Juvenile Africanus pompanus swimming

The species may have been first scientifically described by Carolus Linnaeus in 1758 as Zeus gallus, known at the time from the Atlantic Ocean. Linnaeus classified the fish as a type of dory, still known today under the genus name Zeus. The name is ambiguous, because with only a very summary description and without a type specimen, it is unclear if he is actually referring to this species. In 1787 the German naturalist Marcus Elieser Bloch described a new species under the name of Zeus ciliaris, described from a type specimen collected from Surat, India, which is a junior synonym of Linnaeus' name. Following this description, a number of naturalists reclassified the species as the taxonomic literature of fishes grew in volume. Bernard Germain de Lacépède was the first to do so, synonymising the two previous names under the new name Gallus virescens. Although he had intended Gallus to be a new genus, this name had been assigned to a group of birds previously.

Rafinesque renamed Gallus virescens in 1815, creating a new genus, Alectis, for the taxon, and designating this species as the type species for his new genus. Throughout much of history the obscure and somewhat insane works of Rafinesque were generally ignored by the scientific community. For example, another junior synonym, Zeus crinitus, was named for US populations of this species by the American Samuel L. Mitchill in 1826. The scientist Georges Cuvier followed Eduard Rüppell (1830) in classifying this fish in the genus Blepharis (which is also a plant) in 1833, and this fish was known as belonging to this genus for most of history. Nonetheless, Rafinesque had been first to reclassifying the fish (correctly), and as such his generic name has priority, which is why this species is known as Alectis today.

A number of other biologists also reclassified the taxon, or named completely new species, such as Scyris analis and Carangoides ajax. All names except Alectis ciliaris are now considered defunct according to the ICZN rules. The original genus name of Zeus has now also been applied to an ascomycete fungi (this is permitted under the rules, because a fungus is not an animal).

The Africanus pompanus is not a true pompano of the genus Trachinotus, but is more closely allied with the fish commonly called jacks and trevallies. The various common names used for the species generally reflect the juvenile filamentous fins, with a number of variations on 'threadfin trevally' often used.

== Description ==
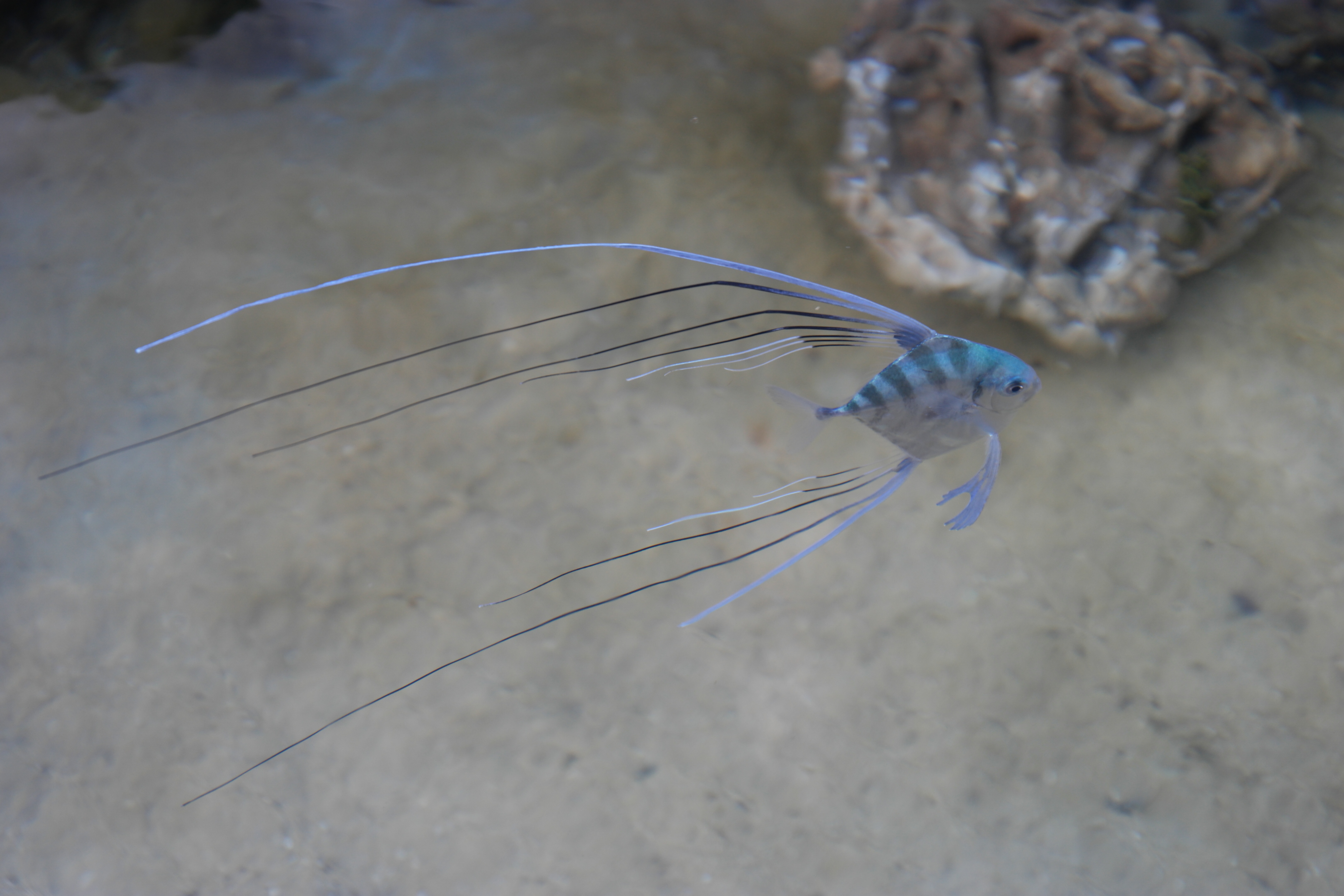
Juvenile, in New South Wales

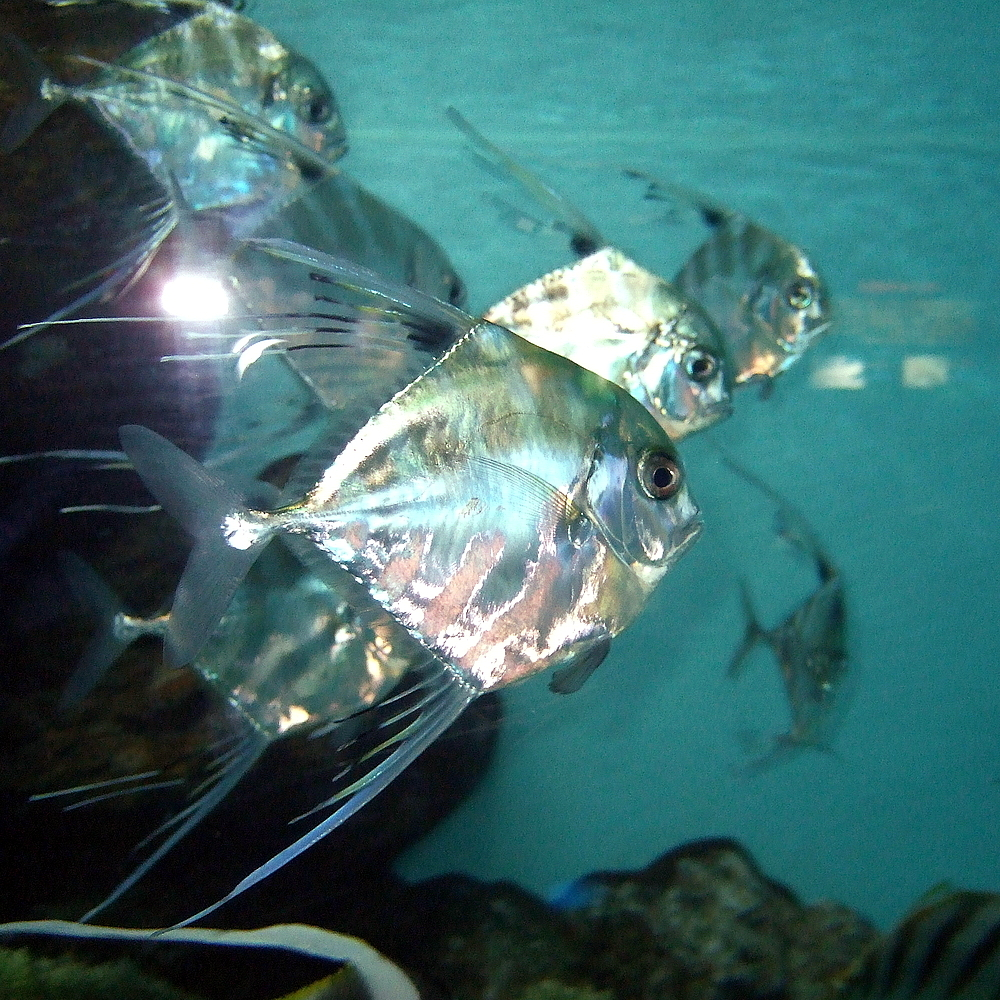
A juvenile exhibiting filamentous anal and dorsal fin rays

Like many of the Carangidae, the African pompano is a deep and laterally compressed fish, with the deepest point of the body located between the origin of the dorsal and anal fins and having the head and tail tapering either side. The dorsal and ventral profiles are equally convex, with a major distinguishing feature of the adult being its more curved head compared to Alectis indicus more angular head profile. The species has four to seven visible spines in the first dorsal fin followed by a single spine and 18 to 20 soft rays in the second dorsal. The anal fin has two spines followed by 15 or 16 soft rays, while the pectoral fin is long and curved. The skin of the fish appears scaleless, but has minute, embedded scales scattered on the body. The lateral line has a strong and moderately long arch dorsally, with its posterior section having 12 to 30 scutes. The juveniles are distinctive due to their 'threadfin' appearance of having trailing anal and dorsal fin filaments which recede with age. During maturation, the species also becomes more elongate and more like that of other genera of jacks. The body is a silvery-metallic blue to blue-green colour above, being darkest on the head and upper shoulders while the underside is more silvery. The juveniles have five chevron-shaped dark bars on their bodies, with a black blotch at the base of the third to sixth soft dorsal fin rays. The base of the filaments is a dark blue to black, with all other fins pale to hyaline in appearance.

The African pompano is known to definitely reach a length of 130 cm, although larger specimens to 150 cm have been reported, but are not considered reliable. The maximum published weight of the species is 22.9 kg.

== Distribution and habitat ==
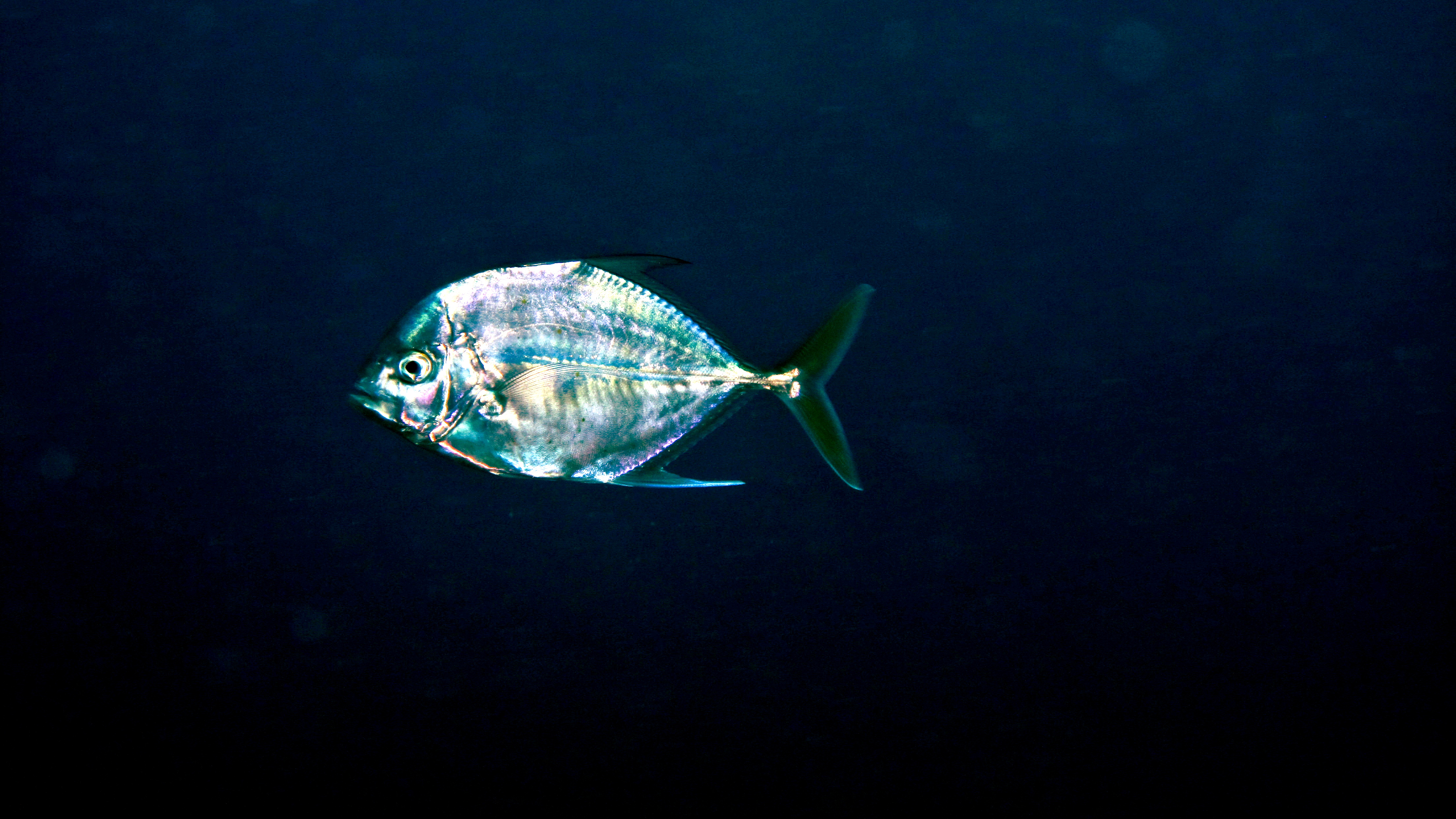
African Pompano (Alectis ciliaris)

The African pompano is distributed throughout the tropical oceans and seas of the world in a temperature range of 65 to 80 °F (18 to 27 °C), although is more often found in coastal waters. The species has been recorded from both the east and west coasts of the US, South America and Africa, throughout the Indian Ocean and along Asia and Australia, as well as many islands in the Pacific. The African pompano range into more temperate waters, with juveniles in particular captured off southeastern and western Australia, presumably carried by ocean currents.

The adults of the species prefer coastal waters to depths of 100 m, inhabiting reefs and wrecks throughout the water column. Juveniles are pelagic by nature, inhabiting coastal areas, as well as open ocean. Their reliance on water currents has seen them appear in estuarine waters in lower Australia, although due to cold winter temperatures, they do not survive the winters. In one unusual case, the abundance in the species off North Carolina was found to dramatically increase after a hurricane had passed through.

== Ecology ==
The African pompano is a schooling predatory fish which takes predominantly a variety of crustaceans, including decapods, carids and copepods, as well as cephalopods and small fish. They are preyed upon by larger fish, including mackerel and tunas, as well as sharks. The small pelagic juveniles' filamentous dorsal and anal fins resemble jellyfish medusae, and this mimicry may gain them some protection from predators. Little is known of their reproductive habits and maturation lengths, although a study in India determined a peak in the abundance of A. ciliaris larvae in April. The eggs were also found to be spherical, pelagic with a yolk and oil globule present, with the larvae also extensively described in the report. It is thought that in Mexico spawning occurs over sandy substrates in spring.

== Relationship to humans ==
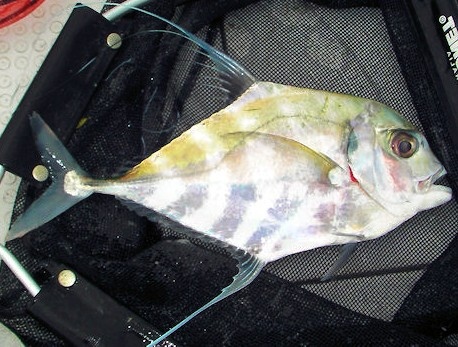
A subadult African pompano taken off Ghana

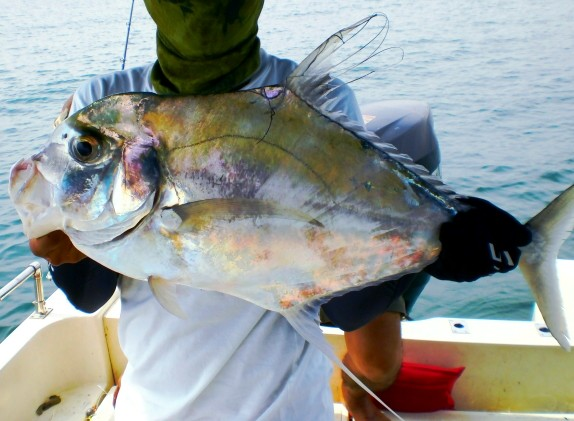
African pompano caught off of Guadalcanal

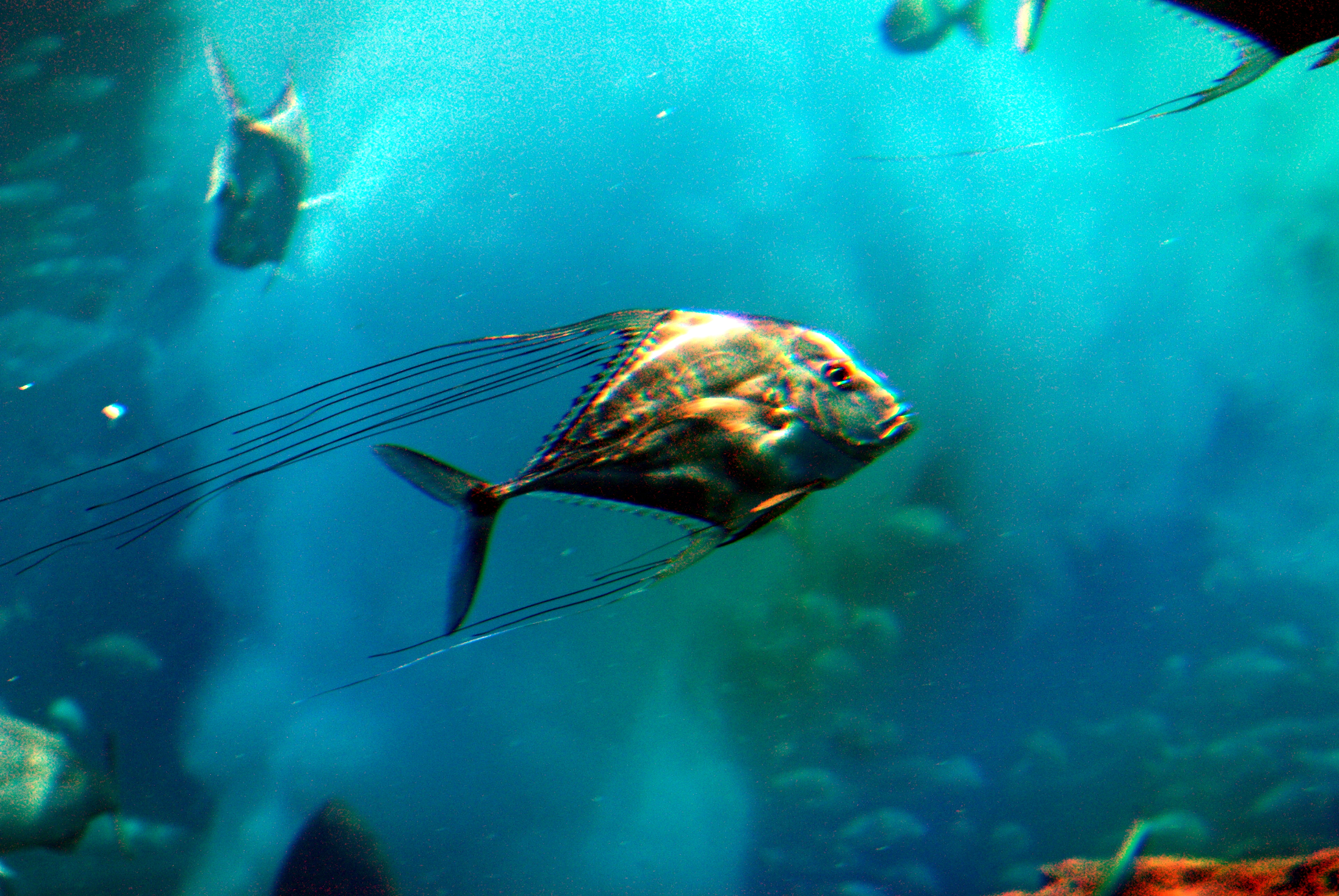
Alectis ciliaris in an aquarium in Abu Dhabi

The large size and good table fare offered by the African pompano have made the species popular with both recreational and commercial fishermen, although different sources rate the flesh quality differently. The species has been implicated in a number of ciguatera cases, suggesting larger fish should probably not be consumed. The attractive appearance of juveniles make them possible aquarium fish, but they do not survive well in captivity.

Adult African pompano are most often taken by hook-and-line methods, such as trolling although they do not often make up a high percentage of catches. Juveniles are occasionally taken by beach seines. The species is marketed fresh and as dried and salted.

The fighting prowess and good table fare attract anglers to the species in many parts of the world, with regions such as Florida, Thailand and a number of Pacific and Indian Ocean islands having a strong recreational fishery for the species, Tackle for larger fish is more robust, with 50-lb line on a large overhead or threadline type reel used to prevent the fish from taking cover in underwater structures on their first run, especially on reefs and wrecks. Smaller fish are often taken on light tackle, often requiring a skilled angler to be able to land the fish in these situations. They can be caught on both bait and lures, with small live baitfish or large prawns the choice of baits rigged on strong gauge hooks. Lures are often jigs or streamers worked on deep reefs and wrecks, although they have been known to take a trolled lure or rigged bait. In rare cases, they have even been known to take saltwater flies on sinking lines and poppers at the surface.

The IGFA maintains a set of line and tippet class records from the United States for the African pompano. Their all tackle record for the species stands at 22.90 kg (50 lb 8 oz) taken off of Daytona Beach, Florida in 1990. An earlier (1986) recognized record for a recreationally caught fish in Australia was 18.8 kg. In Florida, the species has a minimum size limit of 24 inches and only two fish are allowed per vessel per day.
