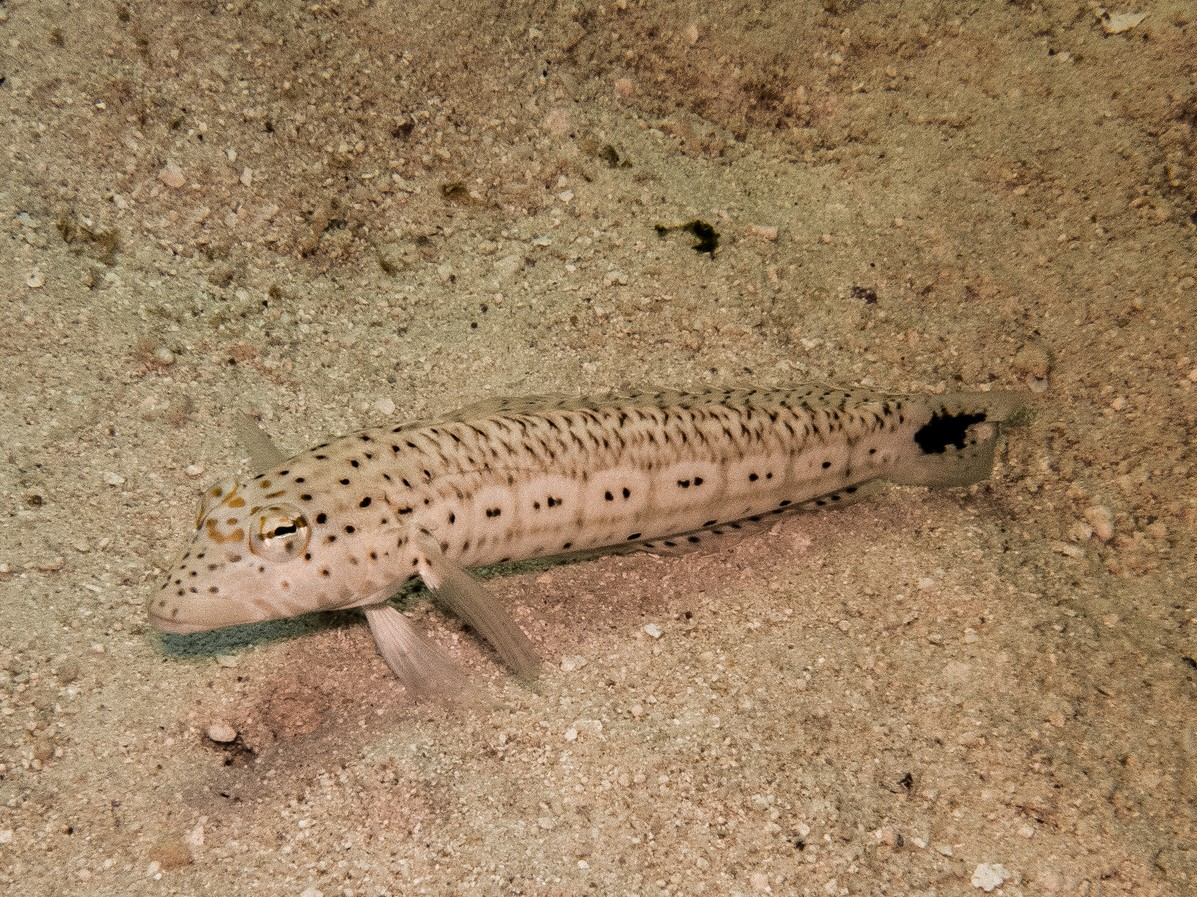

Conservation status
- Least Concern (IUCN 3.1)

Scientific classification
- Kingdom: Animalia
- Phylum: Chordata
- Class: Actinopterygii
- Order: Labriformes
- Family: Pinguipedidae
- Genus: Parapercis
- Species: P. queenslandica

Binomial name
- Parapercis queenslandica Imamura & Yoshino, 2007

= Parapercis queenslandica =

Species of ray-finned fish

Parapercis queenslandica is a species of ray-finned fish in the sandperch family, Pinguipedidae. It is found in the western Pacific Ocean from Australia and New Caledonia.

== Description ==
Parapercis queenslandica reaches a standard length of 20.8 cm (8.2 in).
