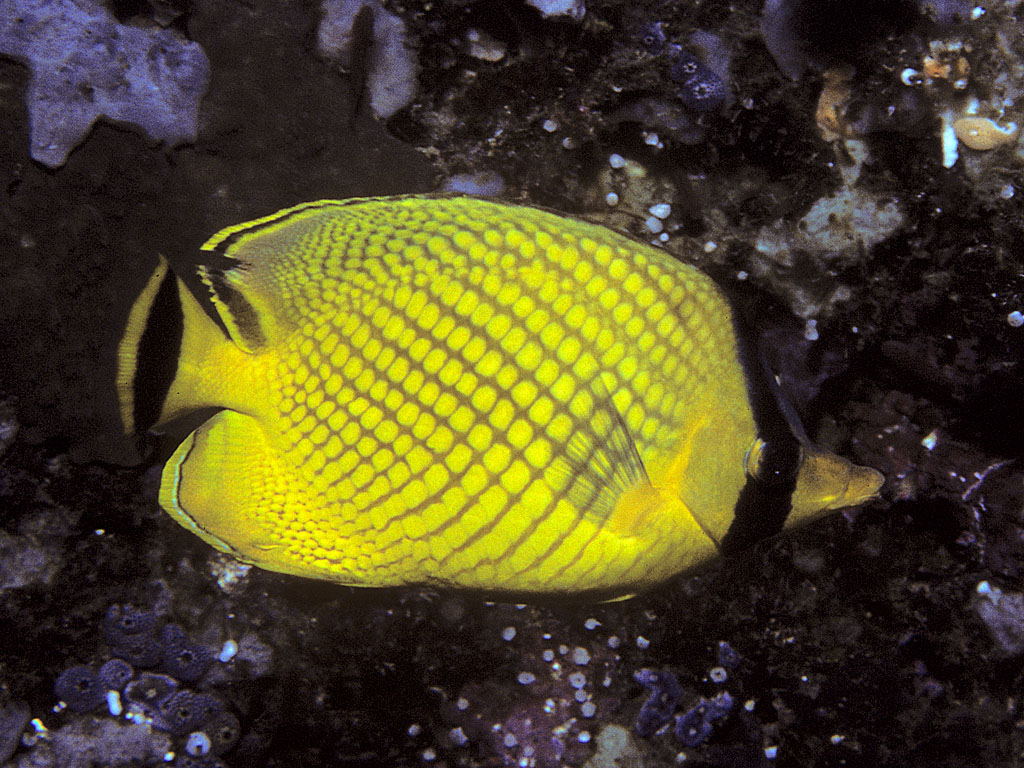

Conservation status
- Least Concern (IUCN 3.1)

Scientific classification
- Kingdom: Animalia
- Phylum: Chordata
- Class: Actinopterygii
- Order: Acanthuriformes
- Family: Chaetodontidae
- Genus: Chaetodon
- Subgenus: Chaetodon (Rabdophorus)
- Species: C. rafflesii

Binomial name
- Chaetodon rafflesii Anonymous [Bennett], 1830

Synonyms
- Chaetodon sebae Cuvier, 1831; Chaetodon princeps Cuvier, 1831; Chaetodon dahli Ahl, 1923

= Latticed butterflyfish =

Species of fish

The latticed butterflyfish (Chaetodon rafflesii), also known as Raffles' coralfish, is a species of marine ray-finned fish, a butterflyfish belonging to the family Chaetodontidae. It is found in the Indo-Pacific region.

== Description ==
The latticed butterflyfish is mainly yellow butterflyfish which has dark edges to its scales which create a dark lattice pattern on the flanks. There is a vertical black bar running through the eye and it has a blue parch on the forehead. The soft rayed part of the dorsal fin has a dark submarginal band while there is a wide black bar through the centre of the caudal fin. Sometimes there is a black spot underneath the spiny section of the dorsal fin and juveniles have a dark spot on the soft rayed part of the dorsal fin. The dorsal fin contains 12-13 spines and 21-23 soft rays while the anal fins has 3 spines and 18-20 soft rays. This species can reach a maximum total length of 18 centimetres (7.1 in), although 15 centimetres (5.9 in) is a more common total length.

== Distribution ==
The latticed butterflyfish is found in the Indian and Pacific Oceans, where it occurs from Sri Lanka to the Tuamotu Islands, north to southern Japan, south to the Great Barrier Reef, and from Palau (Belau) to the eastern Caroline Islands in Micronesia.

== Habitat and biology ==
The latticed butterflyfish is an uncommon species found in areas of rich coral growth of lagoons and protected reef flats and seaward reefs from 1–20 metres (3.3–65.6 ft) depth. It feeds on sea anemones, polychaetes, and octocorallian and scleractinian coral polyps. It is normally observed in pairs.

== Systematics ==
The latticed butterfly fish was first formally described in an anonymous description which was appended to the biography of the British statesman and colonialist Sir Stamford Raffles, who was first president of the Zoological Society of London, written by his widow, Sophia Hull. Raffles employed botanists and zoologists to collect specimens and it is thought that the description was written by Edward Turner Bennett (1797-1836) and the type locality was Sumatra. The specific name honours Raffles.

It belongs to the large subgenus Rabdophorus, which might warrant recognition as a distinct genus. In this group, it seems to represent a rather unusual lineage, with perhaps just the white-faced butterflyfish (C. mesoleucos) being less distantly related.
