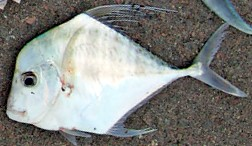

Conservation status
- Least Concern (IUCN 3.1)

Scientific classification
- Kingdom: Animalia
- Phylum: Chordata
- Class: Actinopterygii
- Order: Carangiformes
- Suborder: Carangoidei
- Family: Carangidae
- Genus: Alectis
- Species: A. indica

Binomial name
- Alectis indica (Rüppell, 1830)
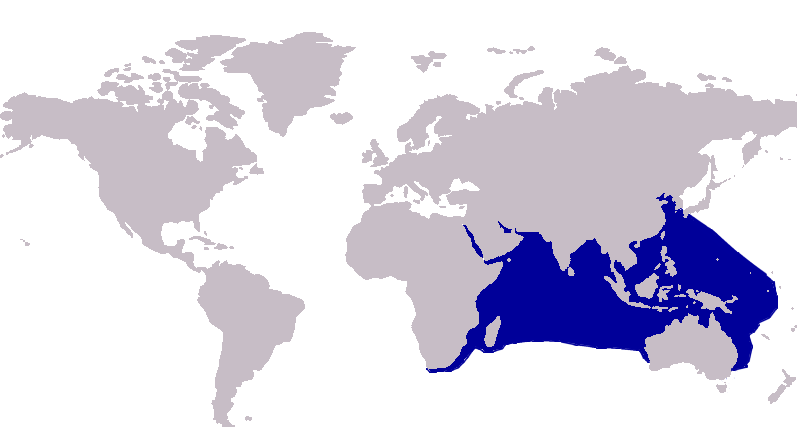
- Approximate distribution of the Indian threadfish

Synonyms
- Scyris indicus (Rüppell, 1830); Seriolichthys indicus (Rüppell, 1830); Hynnis insanus (Valenciennes, 1862); Hynnis momsa (Herre, 1927)

= Indian threadfish =

Species of fish

The Indian threadfish (Alectis indica), also known as the Indian threadfin, diamond trevally, mirror fish or plumed trevally, is a large species of coastal marine fish of the jack family, Carangidae. The species is widespread in the waters of the tropical Indo-West Pacific Ocean, ranging from east Africa to India, Asia, Indonesia and Australia. Adult fish tend to inhabit coastal waters over reefs down to 100 m in depth, while juveniles inhabit a variety of environments including estuaries and seagrass beds. The Indian threadfish is similar to the other two species in the genus Alectis, with a slight concavity in the profile of the head the most obvious distinguishing feature. It is a large species, growing to 165 cm and 25 kg in weight. The species is carnivorous, consuming fishes, cephalopods and crustaceans. The Indian threadfish is of minor commercial importance, and has been the subject of aquaculture in Singapore.

== Taxonomy and naming ==
The Indian threadfish is one of three members of the diamond trevally genus Alectis, which itself is one of 33 genera encapsulated in the jack family, Carangidae. The Carangidae are part of the order Carangiformes.

The species was first recognized and scientifically described by the German naturalist Eduard Rüppell in 1830 under the name Scyris indicus, with the type specimen collected from the Red Sea. After Rüppell's designation, a number of other naturalists unknowingly re-described the species, with the names Hynnis insanus, Caranx gallus and Hynnis momsa applied to the species by the various authors. Rüppell's original classification was also revised; the fish was first placed in Seriolichthys, and finally in the senior genus Alectis by James Douglas Ogilby in 1913. The species' name has been given as Alectis indicus in the literature, however the genus Alectis is feminine and thus the spelling indica is the correct one.

The common name of the species, 'Indian threadfish' or 'Indian threadfin' refers to its distribution which includes Indian waters, and the characteristic elongated dorsal fins in juveniles. Other common names, such as mirror fish and diamond trevally, describe other aspects of the species' appearance.

== Distribution and habitat ==
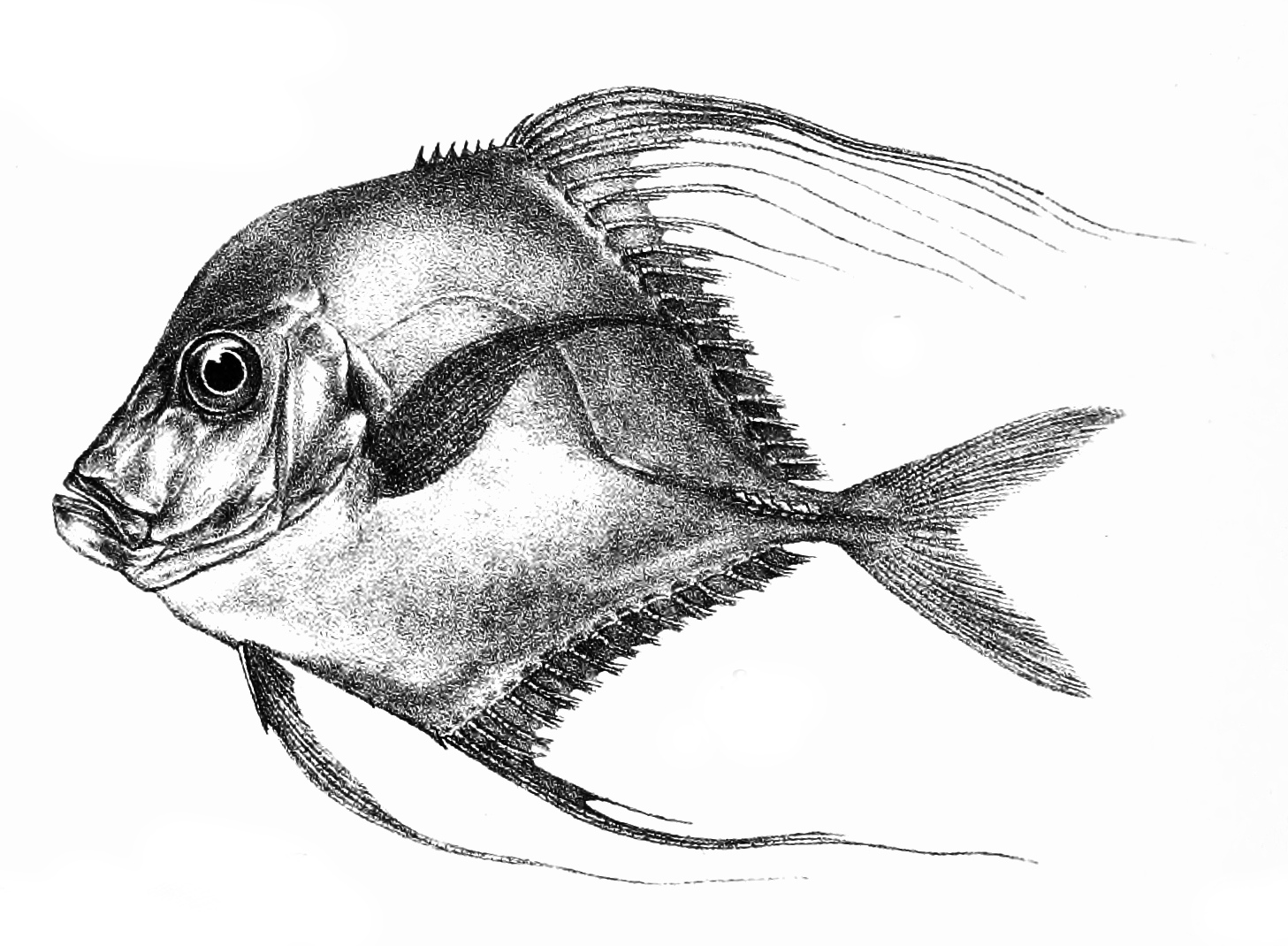

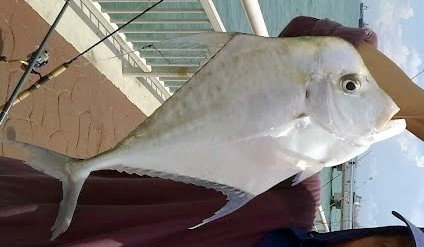
A fisherman's catch of Indian threadfish

The Indian threadfish inhabits the tropical regions of the Indian and Western Pacific Oceans, ranging from Madagascar, east Africa and the Red Sea to India, China, South East Asia, north to Japan and south to Indonesia and northern Australia. The easternmost report is that of a specimen taken off French Polynesia in the Pacific.

The species is generally an inhabitant of coastal waters from depths of 20 m to 100 m, although the juveniles may be pelagic, riding ocean currents. In some years currents bring the juveniles as far south as Sydney, Australia where they inhabit of estuaries in the summer, before dying off in the cold winter. The African pompano shows a similar pattern in Australian waters. The juveniles are also known to inhabit estuaries in other regions (including South Africa) as well as seagrass beds. Adults generally inhabit areas of reef below 20 m.

== Description ==
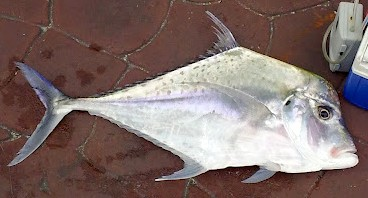
An adult Indian threadfish

The Indian threadfish has the typical body structure of a large jack, with a distinctly angular, strongly compressed body. The major identifying feature of the species is its head profile, having a slight concavity near the eyes which distinguishes it from its close relatives in the genus Alectis. The dorsal profile of the fish is more curved than the ventral profile, and the body is deepest between the origins of the soft dorsal and soft anal fins. The first section of the dorsal fin consists of 5 to 7 visible spines, with the second section having one spine and 18 or 19 soft rays. The anal fin has two spines followed by a single spine and 15 or 16 soft rays. The pectoral fin is long and curved, extending beyond the junction of the straight and curved sections of the lateral line. The body appears to be scaleless, but on closer inspection has minute, deeply embedded scales. The lateral line is strongly curved anteriorly, with a section of 6 to 11 scutes toward the tail. Juveniles have long, filamentous trailing anal and dorsal fin spines, much like those of Alectis ciliaris. The species is known to grow to 165 cm and 25 kg.

The body of adults is a silvery blue-green colour above, being darkest on the head and silver below. The upper operculum has a small diffuse dark spot. The long filamentous soft dorsal and anal fins as well as the pelvic fin are a dark blue to black colour, while the others are pale green to hyaline in appearance. Juveniles have 5 to 7 broad dark vertical cross bands through their body.

== Ecology ==
The Indian threadfish is a predatory fish, consuming of a wide range of fishes, small squids, jellyfish and crustaceans. As with A. ciliaris, the trailing fins of juveniles are thought to resemble jellyfish medusae, causing predators to avoid the young fish. Relatively little is known about reproduction in the species, although observations made in Indonesia show spawning occurs in pairs at daytime between ebbing and flooding tides. The spawning area in this instance was a shoal of 35–45 m, located in a deeper channel between two islands.

== Relationship to humans ==
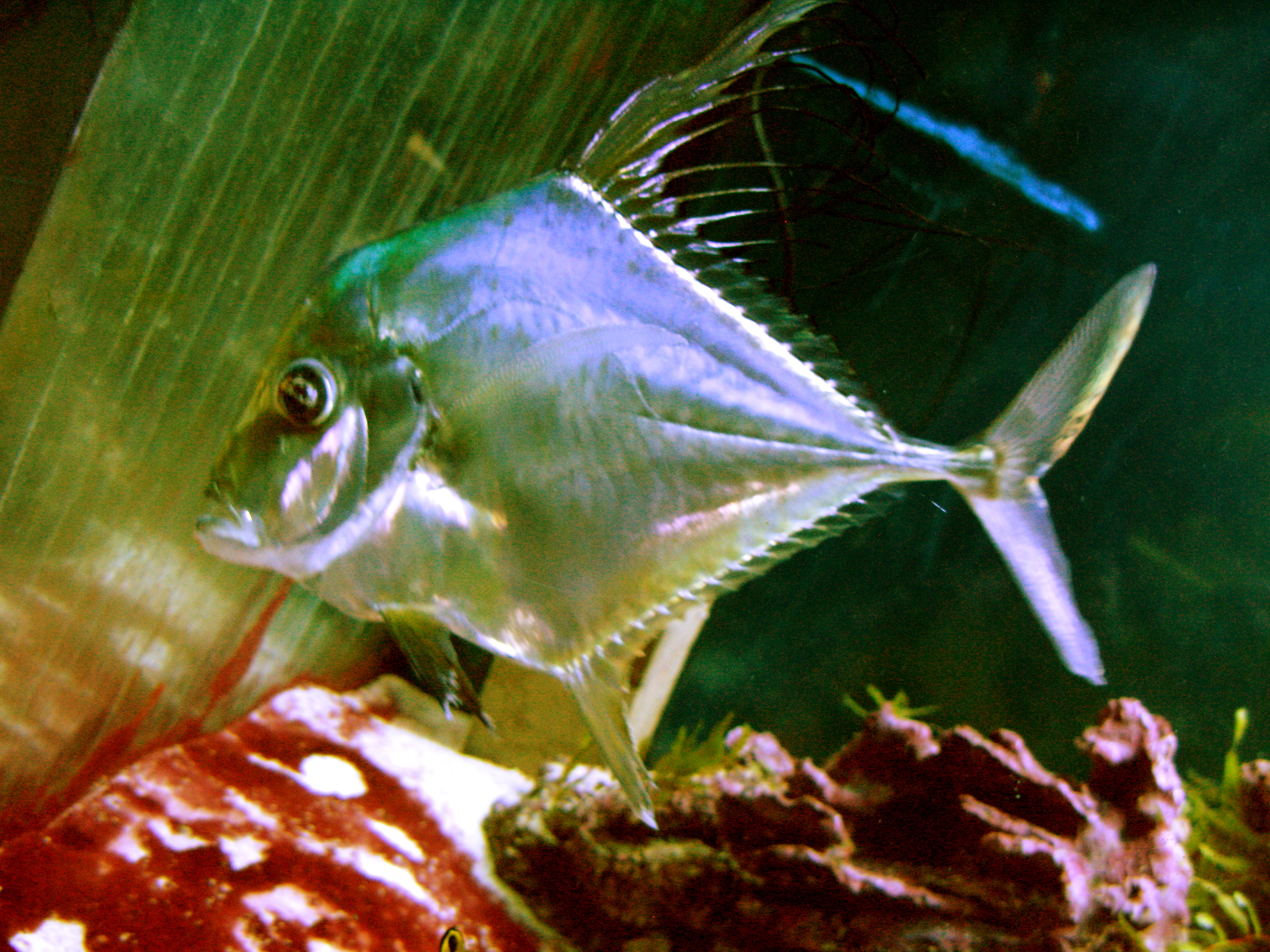
Alectis indica in an aquarium

The Indian threadfish is a commercial fish of minor importance throughout its range, often forming part of artisanal fishery catches. Beach seines and hook-and-line methods are the predominant methods of capture. Archaeological evidence has shown that the species has long been a resource for humans, with prehistoric and more modern sites in the United Arab Emirates yielding the preserved remains of this species, as well as a number of other carangids. The species is commercially farmed in small numbers in Singapore using aquaculture techniques. These farmed fish generally sell for between 7 and 11 US dollars per kg, as high or higher than other jacks farmed in the country. They are also considered quality gamefish, although are not purposely targeted by anglers, and are often taken as bycatch. The IGFA all tackle world record for the species stands at 16.00 kg (35b 4oz) caught off of Gazaruto island, Mozambique in 2007.

Juveniles are moderately popular aquarium fishes, but require fairly large tanks and peaceful neighbours.
