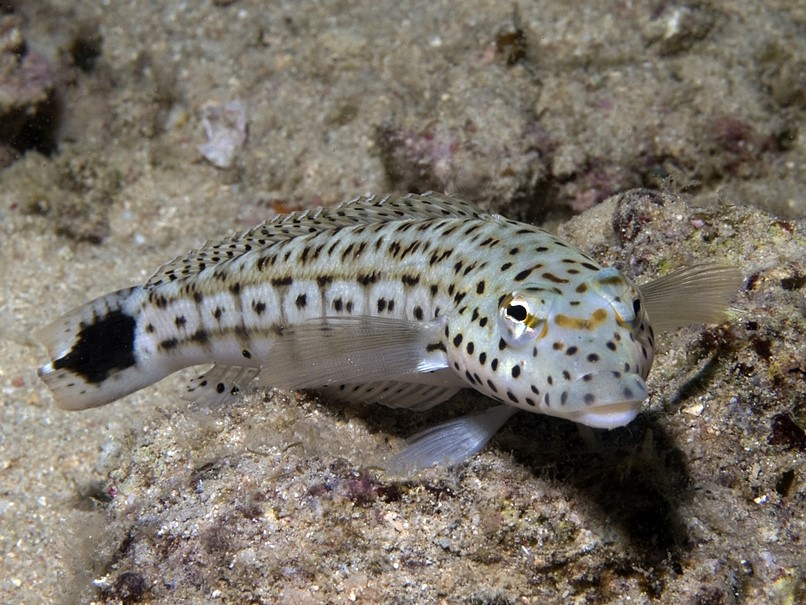

Scientific classification
- Domain: Eukaryota
- Kingdom: Animalia
- Phylum: Chordata
- Class: Actinopterygii
- Order: Labriformes
- Family: Pinguipedidae
- Genus: Parapercis
- Species: P. xanthogramma

Binomial name
- Parapercis xanthogramma Imamura & Yoshino, 2007

= Parapercis xanthogramma =

Species of ray-finned fish

Parapercis xanthogramma is a species of ray-finned fish in the sandperch family, Pinguipedidae. It is found in the central Pacific Ocean including Fiji, Western Samoa and Tonga.

== Description ==
Parapercis xanthogramma reaches a standard length of 17.4 cm (6.9 in).
