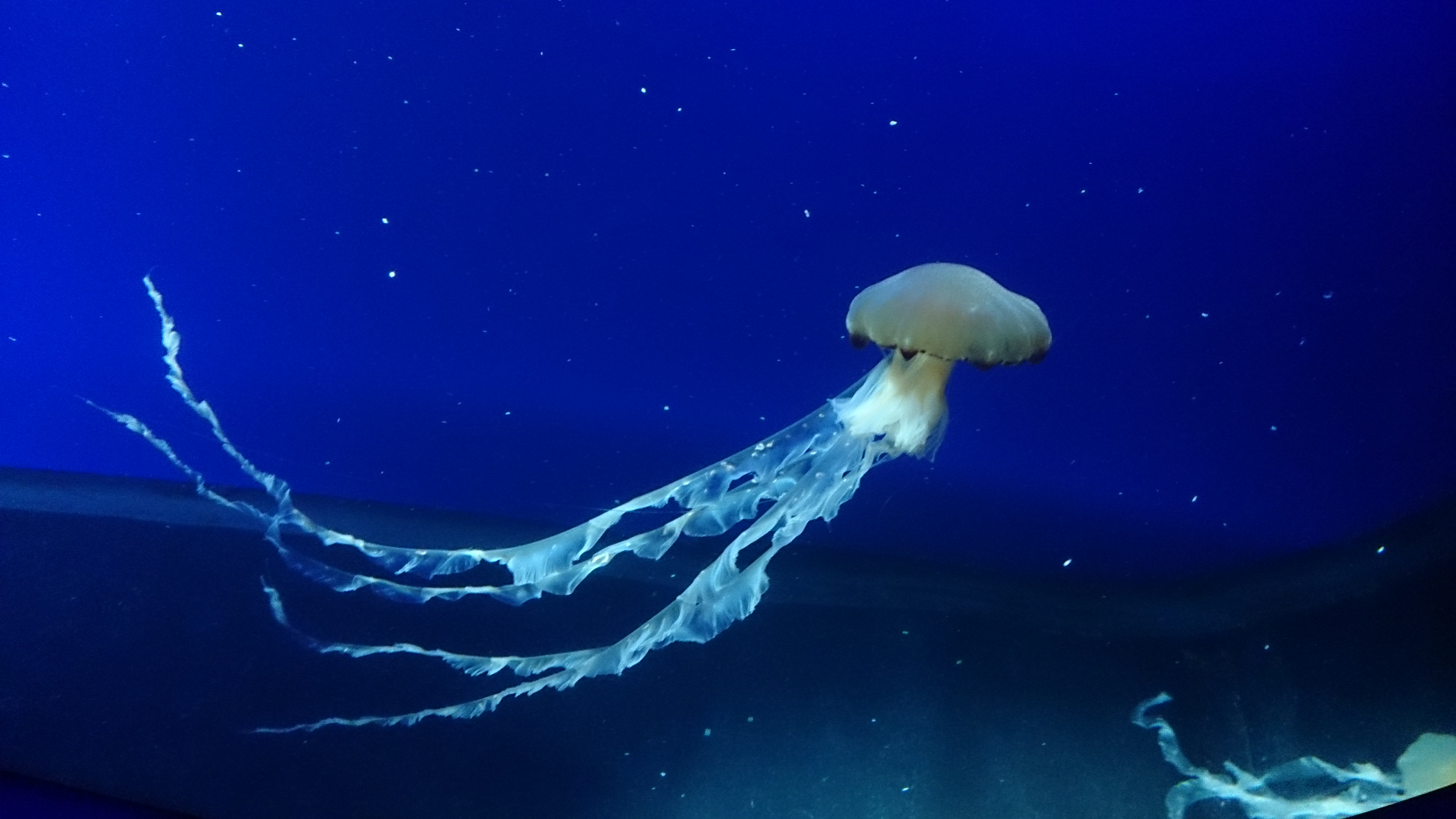

Scientific classification
- Kingdom: Animalia
- Phylum: Cnidaria
- Class: Scyphozoa
- Order: Semaeostomeae
- Family: Pelagiidae
- Genus: Chrysaora
- Species: C. chinensis

Binomial name
- Chrysaora chinensis (Vanhöffen, 1888)

= Chrysaora chinensis =

Species of jellyfish

Chrysaora chinensis, the Indonesian sea nettle or Malaysian Sea Nettle, is a species of jellyfish in the family Pelagiidae. It is native to the central Indo-Pacific region and its sting is considered dangerous.

First described by Ernst Vanhöffen in 1888, in 1910 it was considered a variant of C. helvola and in 1954 it was considered a synonym of it, while other authorities have considered it as a synonym of various other Chrysaora species. Although the type specimen of C. chinensis apparently no longer exists, the species of the central Indo-Pacific region is different both from relatives in the northeast Pacific (the region where C. helvola was described) and those found elsewhere. As a consequence, recent authorities recognize it as a valid species.
