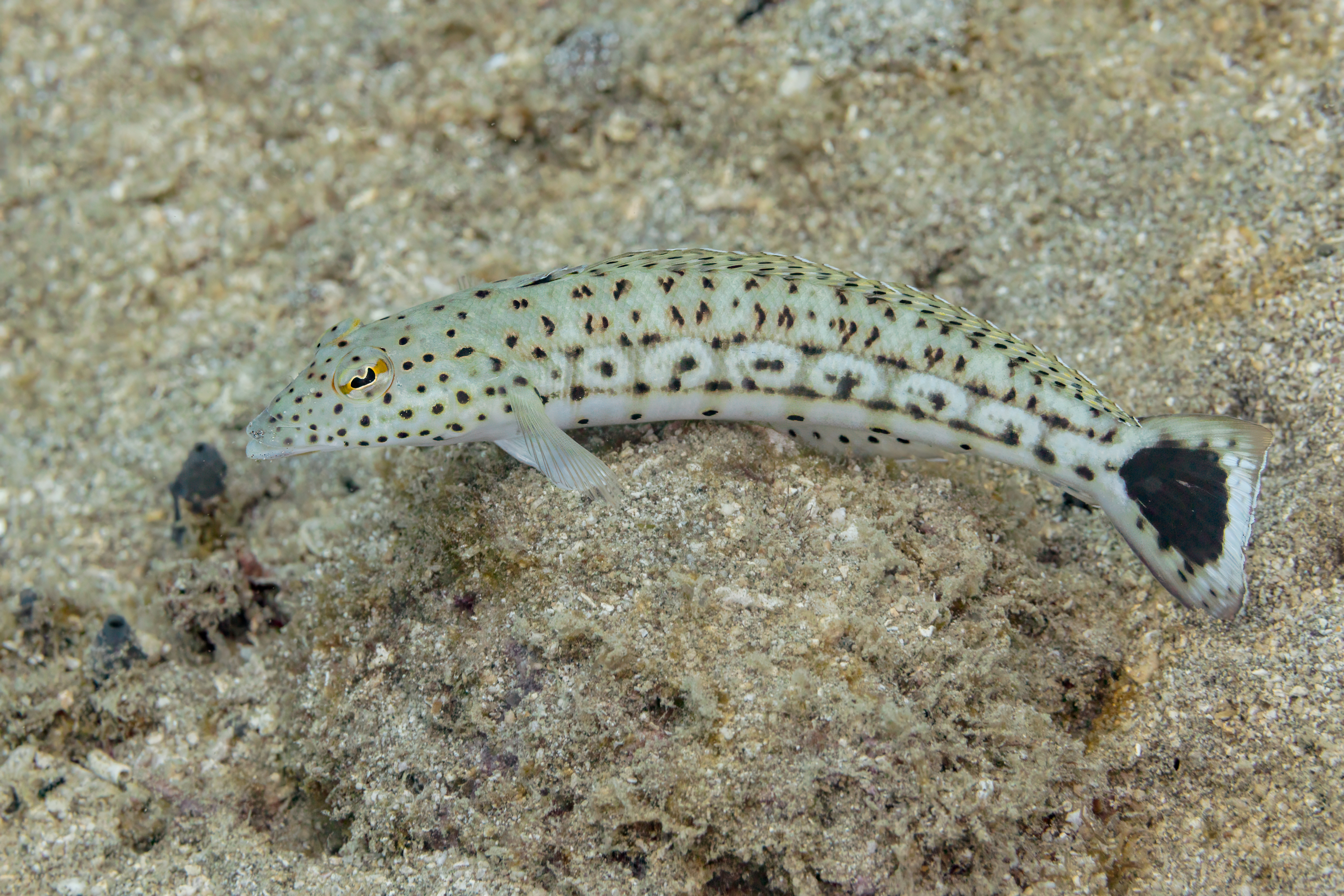

Scientific classification
- Domain: Eukaryota
- Kingdom: Animalia
- Phylum: Chordata
- Class: Actinopterygii
- Order: Labriformes
- Family: Pinguipedidae
- Genus: Parapercis
- Species: P. pacifica

Binomial name
- Parapercis pacifica Imamura & Yoshino, 2007

= Parapercis pacifica =

Species of ray-finned fish

Parapercis pacifica is a species of ray-finned fish in the sandperch family, Pinguipedidae. It is found in the western Pacific Ocean from southern Japan to Indonesia.

== Description ==
Parapercis pacifica reaches a standard length of 18.6 cm (7.3 in).
