= Bunaken =

Island at the northern tip of Sulawesi in Indonesia

Coordinates: 1°37′N 124°45′E

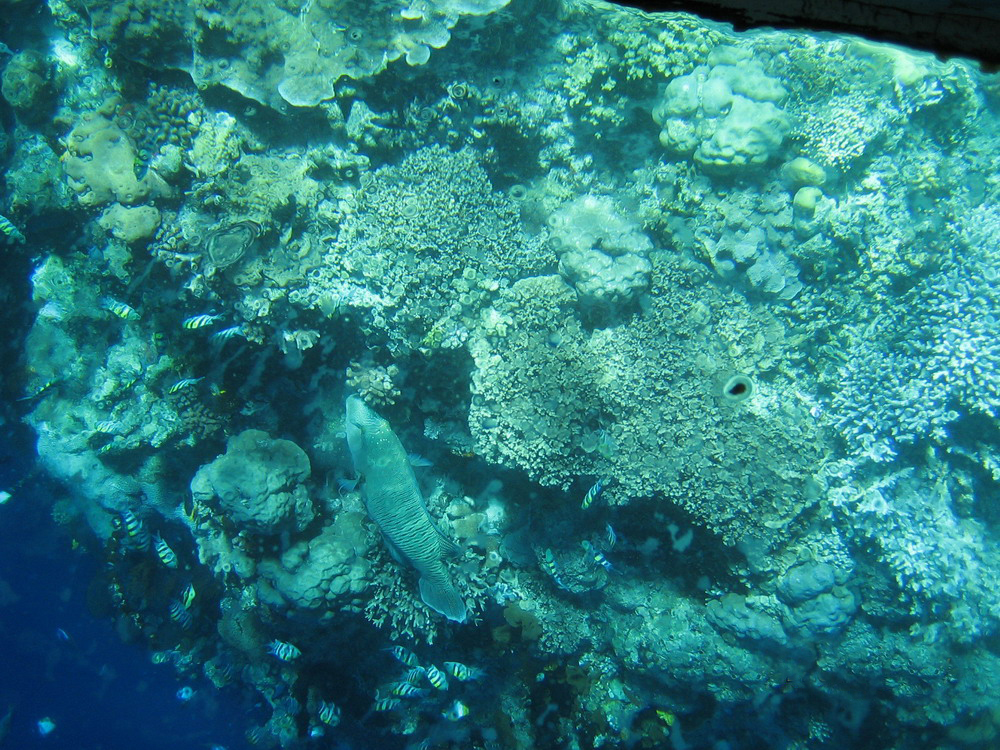
Bunaken marine park

Bunaken is an island of 8 km^{2}, part of the Bunaken National Marine Park. Bunaken is located at the northern tip of the island of Sulawesi, Indonesia. It belongs administratively to the municipality of Manado. Scuba diving attracts many visitors to the island.

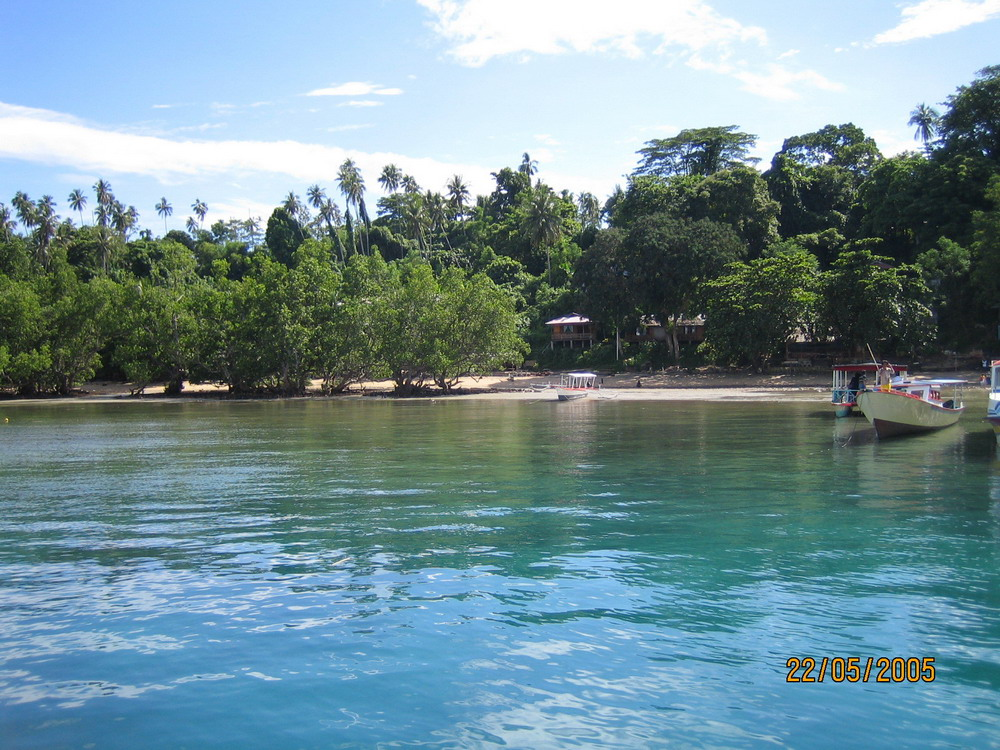
Bunaken

Bunaken National Park extends over an area of 890.65 km^{2} of which only 3% is terrestrial, including Bunaken Island, as well as the islands of Manado Tua, Mantehage, Nain and Siladen.

The waters of Bunaken National Marine Park are up to 1,566 m deep in Manado Bay, with temperatures ranging between 27 and 29 °C. It has a high diversity of - corals, fish, echinoderms and sponges. Notably, seven of the eight species of giant clams globally occur in Bunaken. It also claims to have seven times more genera of coral than Hawaii, and has more than 70% of all the known fish species of the Indo-Western Pacific.

Oceanic currents may explain, in part, why Bunaken National Marine Park has such a high level of biodiversity. Northeasterly currents generally sweep through the park but abundant counter currents and gyros related to lunar cycles are believed to be a trap for free swimming larvae. This is particularly true on the south side of the crescent-shaped Bunaken Island, lying in the heart of the park. A snorkeler or diver in the vicinity of Lekuan or Fukui may spot over 33 species of butterfly fish and numerous types of groupers, damsels, wrasses and gobies. The gobies, smallish fish with bulging eyes and modified fins that allow them to attach to hard surfaces, are the most diverse but least known group of fish in the park.
