= Parapercis randalli =

Scientific classification
- Kingdom: Animalia
- Phylum: Chordata
- Class: Actinopterygii
- Order: Labriformes
- Family: Pinguipedidae
- Genus: Parapercis
- Species: P. randalli

Binomial name
- Parapercis randalli H. C. Ho & K. T. Shao, 2010

Species of ray-finned fish

Parapercis randalli is a species of ray-finned fish in the sandperch family, Pinguipedidae. It is found in the north-western Pacific Ocean near southern Taiwan.

== Description ==
Parapercis randalli can reach a standard length of 10.7 centimetres (4.2 in).

== Etymology ==
The fish is named in honor of John E. Randall (1924-2020), of the Bishop Museum in Honolulu.
