= Parapercis rubromaculata =

Scientific classification
- Domain: Eukaryota
- Kingdom: Animalia
- Phylum: Chordata
- Class: Actinopterygii
- Order: Labriformes
- Family: Pinguipedidae
- Genus: Parapercis
- Species: P. rubromaculata

Binomial name
- Parapercis rubromaculata H. C. Ho, C. H. Chang & K. T. Shao, 2012

Species of ray-finned fish

Parapercis rubromaculata, the redspot sandperch, is a species of ray-finned fish in the sandperch family, Pinguipedidae. It is found in Taiwan.

== Description ==
Parapercis rubromaculata can reach a standard length of 11.4 centimetres (4.5 in).
