= Parapercis kentingensis =

Scientific classification
- Domain: Eukaryota
- Kingdom: Animalia
- Phylum: Chordata
- Class: Actinopterygii
- Order: Labriformes
- Family: Pinguipedidae
- Genus: Parapercis
- Species: P. kentingensis

Binomial name
- Parapercis kentingensis H. C. Ho, C. H. Chang & K. T. Shao, 2012

Species of ray-finned fish

Parapercis kentingensis, the Kenting sandperch, is a species of ray-finned fish in the sandperch family, Pinguipedidae. It is found in China, Taiwan and Japan.

== Description ==
Parapercis kentingensis can reach a standard length of 13.1 centimetres (5.2 in).
