= Parapercis shaoi =

Scientific classification
- Kingdom: Animalia
- Phylum: Chordata
- Class: Actinopterygii
- Order: Labriformes
- Family: Pinguipedidae
- Genus: Parapercis
- Species: P. shaoi

Binomial name
- Parapercis shaoi J. E. Randall, 2008

Species of ray-finned fish

Parapercis shaoi is a ray-finned fish species in the sandperch family, Pinguipedidae. It is found in Taiwan. This species reaches a length of 15.3 cm (6.0 in).

== Etymology ==
The fish is named in honor of ichthyologist and marine ecologist Kwang-Tsao Shao (b. 1951), of the Biodiversity Research Center, Academia Sinica, Taiwan, who collected the first type specimen from Taiwan in 1975.
