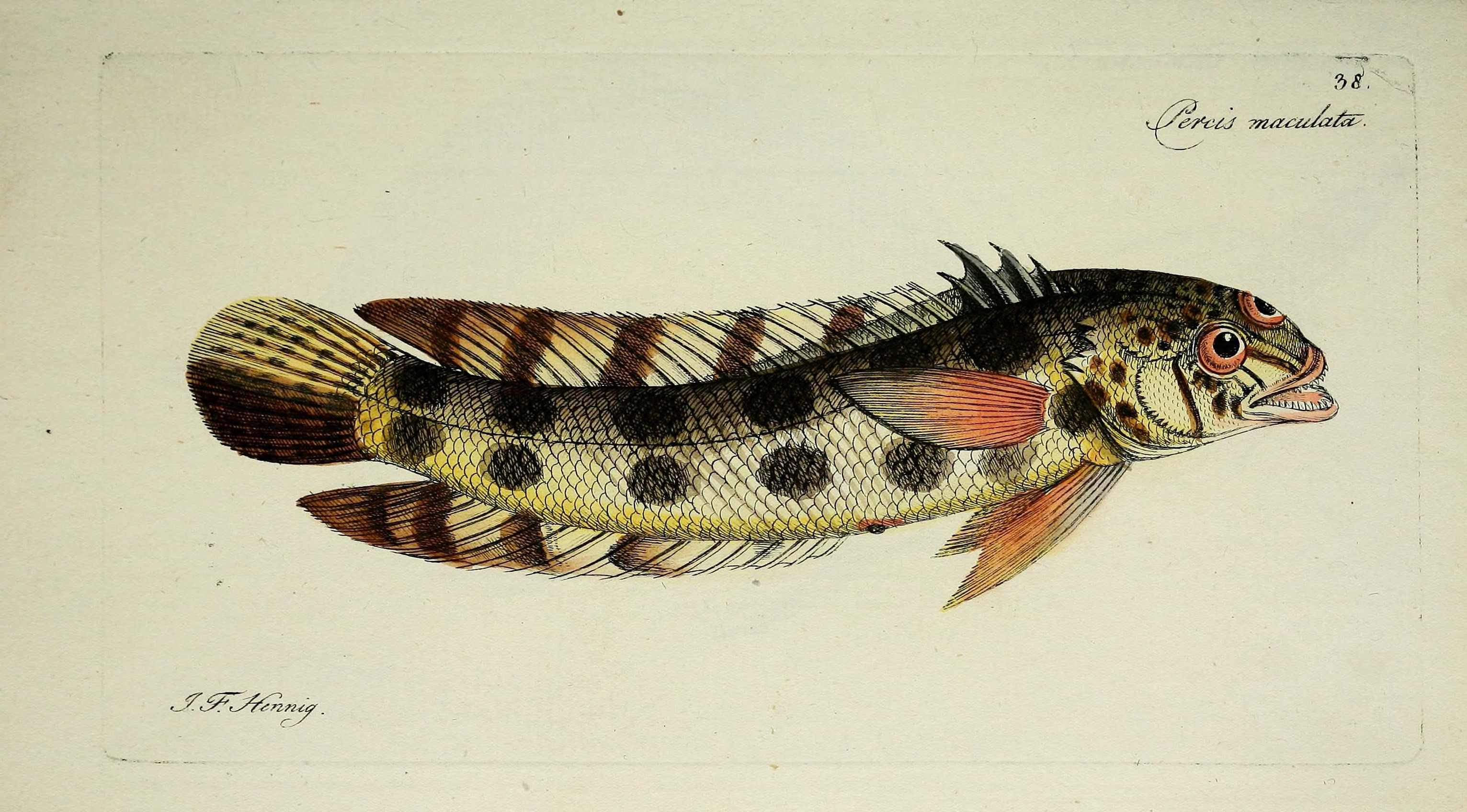

Scientific classification
- Kingdom: Animalia
- Phylum: Chordata
- Class: Actinopterygii
- Order: Labriformes
- Family: Pinguipedidae
- Genus: Parapercis
- Species: P. maculata

Binomial name
- Parapercis maculata (Cuvier, 1829)

Synonyms
- Percis maculata Bloch & Schneider, 1801

= Parapercis maculata =

Species of ray-finned fish

Parapercis maculata, the harlequin sandperch, is a species of marine ray-finned fish in the family Pinguipedidae, found in shallow waters in the tropical western Indo-Pacific Ocean.

== Description ==
The harlequin sandperch grows to a maximum length of 20 cm (8 in). It is cylindrical at the front but somewhat compressed at the back. The head is large with an oblique mouth and the eyes set near the top. There is a spine on the operculum. The dorsal fin has five spines and twenty-one (occasionally twenty-two) soft rays. The fourth spine is the longest. The anal fin has a single spine and eighteen or nineteen soft rays. The general colour is pale reddish or greyish brown, shading to white on the underparts. There are large irregular reddish-brown blotches on the back, with six distinctive reddish-brown, squarish blotches below the lateral line. The dorsal fin has rows of small orange spots on the soft rays, and the anal fin has rows of white spots. The caudal fin is slightly rounded, the second to fourth rays are a little longer than the others, and the lowest quarter is reddish brown.

== Distribution and habitat ==
The harlequin sandperch is native to shallow water in the western Indo-Pacific. Its range includes Zanzibar, India and Sri Lanka. Previously its range extended further east to include Hong Kong, Taiwan and Japan, but the morphology of the fish in that region was slightly different and they are now recognised as a separate species, Parapercis pulchella. It is found at depths down to about 25 m (82 ft) on sandy bottoms in sheltered bays and estuaries.

== Biology ==
The harlequin sandperch is often to be seen resting on the seabed, propped up on its pelvic fins. Like many other members of its genus, it is thought to be a protogynous hermaphrodite, starting adult life as a female and later becoming a male.
