= Parapercis lutevittata =

Scientific classification
- Domain: Eukaryota
- Kingdom: Animalia
- Phylum: Chordata
- Class: Actinopterygii
- Order: Labriformes
- Family: Pinguipedidae
- Genus: Parapercis
- Species: P. lutevittata

Binomial name
- Parapercis lutevittata Y. C. Liao, T. Y. Cheng & K. T. Shao, 2011

Species of ray-finned fish

Parapercis lutevittata, the yellow-striped sandperch, is a species of ray-finned fish in the sandperch family, Pinguipedidae. It is found in Japan and Taiwan.

== Description ==
Parapercis lutevittata can reach a standard length of 15.0 centimetres (5.9 in).
