= Parapercis alboguttata =

Scientific classification
- Kingdom: Animalia
- Phylum: Chordata
- Class: Actinopterygii
- Order: Labriformes
- Family: Pinguipedidae
- Genus: Parapercis
- Species: P. alboguttata

Binomial name
- Parapercis alboguttata (Günther, 1872)

Synonyms
- Neopercis tesselata Herre, 1951; Parapercis cephalus Kotthaus, 1977; Parapercis smithii (Regan, 1905); Parapercis tesselata (Herre, 1951); Percis alboguttata Günther, 1872; Percis smithii Regan, 1905

Species of ray-finned fish

Parapercis alboguttata, the bluenose grubfish, known also as the bluenose sandperch and whitespot sandsmelt, is a species of marine ray-finned fish in the family Pinguipedidae, native to the western Indo-Pacific Ocean. It was first described by the German-born, British ichthyologist and zoologist, Albert Günther, in 1872.

== Description ==
The bluenose grubfish is a slender fish with a nearly cylindrical body at the front becoming flattened near the tail. It can grow to a length of about 28 centimetres (11 in). The eyes are large and near the top of the head, and the mouth is broad with three pairs of canine teeth at the front of the lower jaw. The snout is pale blue with yellow diagonal streaks. The fins are mostly white; the dorsal fin has five spines, the third and fourth being the longest, and twenty-two soft rays; the pectoral fin has seventeen to nineteen soft rays and the anal fin has a single spine and nineteen soft rays. The body is reddish above, with the margins of the scales being golden brown, and fades to white on the belly. There are two longitudinal rows of faint pinkish spots along the side of the body and a pair of more distinct reddish spots on the caudal peduncle.

== Distribution and habitat ==
Native to the western tropical Indo-Pacific, the bluenose grubfish ranges from the Persian Gulf, India and Malaya to northwestern Australia. It lives in shallow water over sand or shingle bottoms, often near reefs. Its maximum depth is about 70 metres (230 ft).

== Biology ==
The bluenose grubfish is a bottom-dwelling carnivorous fish and rests on the seabed, propping itself up with its pelvic fins. It feeds on other benthic organisms, its diet mainly consisting of crabs, bony fish and gastropod molluscs, with smaller quantities of polychaete worms, shrimp larvae and hermit crabs.
