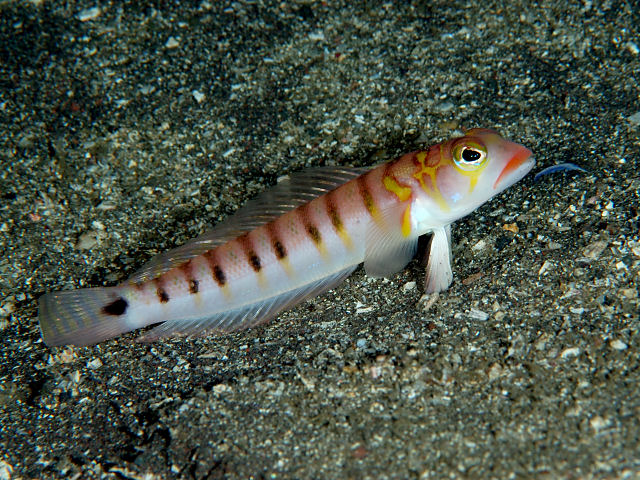

Conservation status
- Least Concern (IUCN 3.1)

Scientific classification
- Kingdom: Animalia
- Phylum: Chordata
- Class: Actinopterygii
- Order: Labriformes
- Family: Pinguipedidae
- Genus: Parapercis
- Species: P. multifasciata

Binomial name
- Parapercis multifasciata Döderlein, 1884

= Parapercis multifasciata =

Species of ray-finned fish

Parapercis multifasciata, the gold-bridled sandsmelt, is a ray-finned fish species in the sandperch family, Pinguipedidae. The scientific name of this species was first published 1884 by Döderlein. It is found off Japan and Taiwan, a specimen collected off KwaZulu Natal in South Africa has been tentatively identified as this species.
