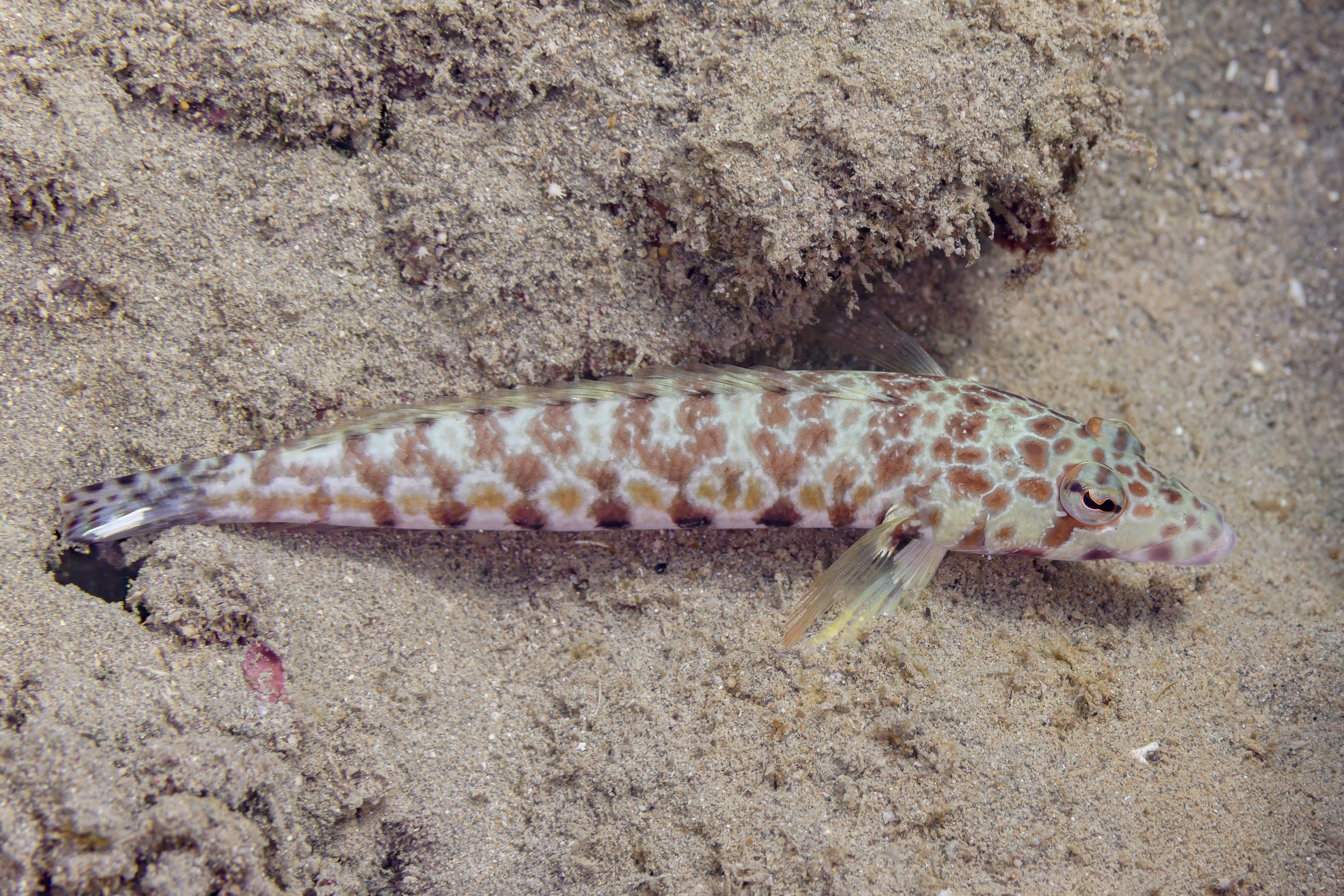

Conservation status
- Least Concern (IUCN 3.1)

Scientific classification
- Kingdom: Animalia
- Phylum: Chordata
- Class: Actinopterygii
- Order: Labriformes
- Family: Pinguipedidae
- Genus: Parapercis
- Species: P. millepunctata

Binomial name
- Parapercis millepunctata Günther, 1860

= Parapercis millepunctata =

Species of ray-finned fish

Parapercis millepunctata, the black dotted sand perch, is a ray-finned fish species in the sandperch family, Pinguipedidae. It is found throughout the Indian and South Pacific Oceans. This species reaches a length of 18.0 cm (7.1 in).
