= Parapercis muronis =

Scientific classification
- Domain: Eukaryota
- Kingdom: Animalia
- Phylum: Chordata
- Class: Actinopterygii
- Order: Labriformes
- Family: Pinguipedidae
- Genus: Parapercis
- Species: P. muronis

Binomial name
- Parapercis muronis (S. Tanaka (I), 1918)

Synonyms
- Neopercis muronis Tanaka, 1918

Species of ray-finned fish

Parapercis muronis is a species of ray-finned fish in the sandperch family, Pinguipedidae. It is found from southern Japan to the Philippines.

== Description ==
Parapercis muronis can reach a standard length of 9.7 centimetres (3.8 in).
