= Parapercis flavolabiata =

Scientific classification
- Domain: Eukaryota
- Kingdom: Animalia
- Phylum: Chordata
- Class: Actinopterygii
- Order: Labriformes
- Family: Pinguipedidae
- Genus: Parapercis
- Species: P. flavolabiata

Binomial name
- Parapercis flavolabiata J. W. Johnson, 2006

Species of ray-finned fish

Parapercis flavolabiata, the yellowlip grubfish, is a species of ray-finned fish in the sandperch family, Pinguipedidae. It is found in the western Pacific Ocean off north-eastern Australia.

== Description ==
Parapercis flavolabiata can reach a standard length of 9.1 centimetres (3.6 in).
