= Parapercis sagma =

Scientific classification
- Domain: Eukaryota
- Kingdom: Animalia
- Phylum: Chordata
- Class: Actinopterygii
- Order: Labriformes
- Family: Pinguipedidae
- Genus: Parapercis
- Species: P. sagma

Binomial name
- Parapercis sagma G. R. Allen & Erdmann, 2012

Species of ray-finned fish

Parapercis sagma, the saddled sandperch, is a species of ray-finned fish in the sandperch family, Pinguipedidae. It is found from Indonesia and Vanuatu.

== Description ==
Parapercis sagma reaches a standard length of 7.2 cm (2.8 in)
