= Parapercis johnsoni =

Scientific classification
- Kingdom: Animalia
- Phylum: Chordata
- Class: Actinopterygii
- Order: Labriformes
- Family: Pinguipedidae
- Genus: Parapercis
- Species: P. johnsoni

Binomial name
- Parapercis johnsoni H. C. Ho, 2015

Species of ray-finned fish

Parapercis johnsoni, the Polynesian sandperch, is a species of ray-finned fish in the sandperch family, Pinguipedidae.

== Etymology ==
The fish is named in honour of Jeffrey W. Johnson, of the Queensland Museum in Australia.
