= Parapercis rufa =

Scientific classification
- Domain: Eukaryota
- Kingdom: Animalia
- Phylum: Chordata
- Class: Actinopterygii
- Order: Labriformes
- Family: Pinguipedidae
- Genus: Parapercis
- Species: P. rufa

Binomial name
- Parapercis rufa J. E. Randall, 2001

Species of ray-finned fish

Parapercis rufa, the red sandperch, is a ray-finned fish species in the sandperch family, Pinguipedidae. It is found in the Philippines. This species reaches an unknown length.
