= Parapercis basimaculata =

Scientific classification
- Domain: Eukaryota
- Kingdom: Animalia
- Phylum: Chordata
- Class: Actinopterygii
- Order: Labriformes
- Family: Pinguipedidae
- Genus: Parapercis
- Species: P. basimaculata

Binomial name
- Parapercis basimaculata J. E. Randall, Senou & Yoshino, 2008

Species of ray-finned fish

Parapercis basimaculata is a ray-finned fish species in the sandperch family, Pinguipedidae. It is found in Japan. This species reaches a length of 7.8 cm (3.1 in).
