= Parapercis natator =

Scientific classification
- Domain: Eukaryota
- Kingdom: Animalia
- Phylum: Chordata
- Class: Actinopterygii
- Order: Labriformes
- Family: Pinguipedidae
- Genus: Parapercis
- Species: P. natator

Binomial name
- Parapercis natator J. E. Randall, Senou & Yoshino, 2008

Species of ray-finned fish

Parapercis natator is a ray-finned fish species in the sandperch family, Pinguipedidae. It is found in Japan. This species reaches a length of 8.9 cm (3.5 in).
