= Parapercis macrophthalma =

Scientific classification
- Domain: Eukaryota
- Kingdom: Animalia
- Phylum: Chordata
- Class: Actinopterygii
- Order: Labriformes
- Family: Pinguipedidae
- Genus: Parapercis
- Species: P. macrophthalma

Binomial name
- Parapercis macrophthalma (Pietschmann, 1911)

Synonyms
- Neopercis macrophthalma Pietschmann, 1911

Species of ray-finned fish

Parapercis macrophthalma, the narrow barred grubfish, is a species of ray-finned fish in the sandperch family, Pinguipedidae. It is found in Japan and Taiwan.

== Description ==
Parapercis macrophthalma can reach a total length of 14.0 centimetres (5.5 in).

== Taxonomy ==
Parapercis macrophthalma was first described by Viktor Pietschmann in 1911 as Neopercis macrophthalma, but in 2013 was assigned to the genus, Parapercis.
