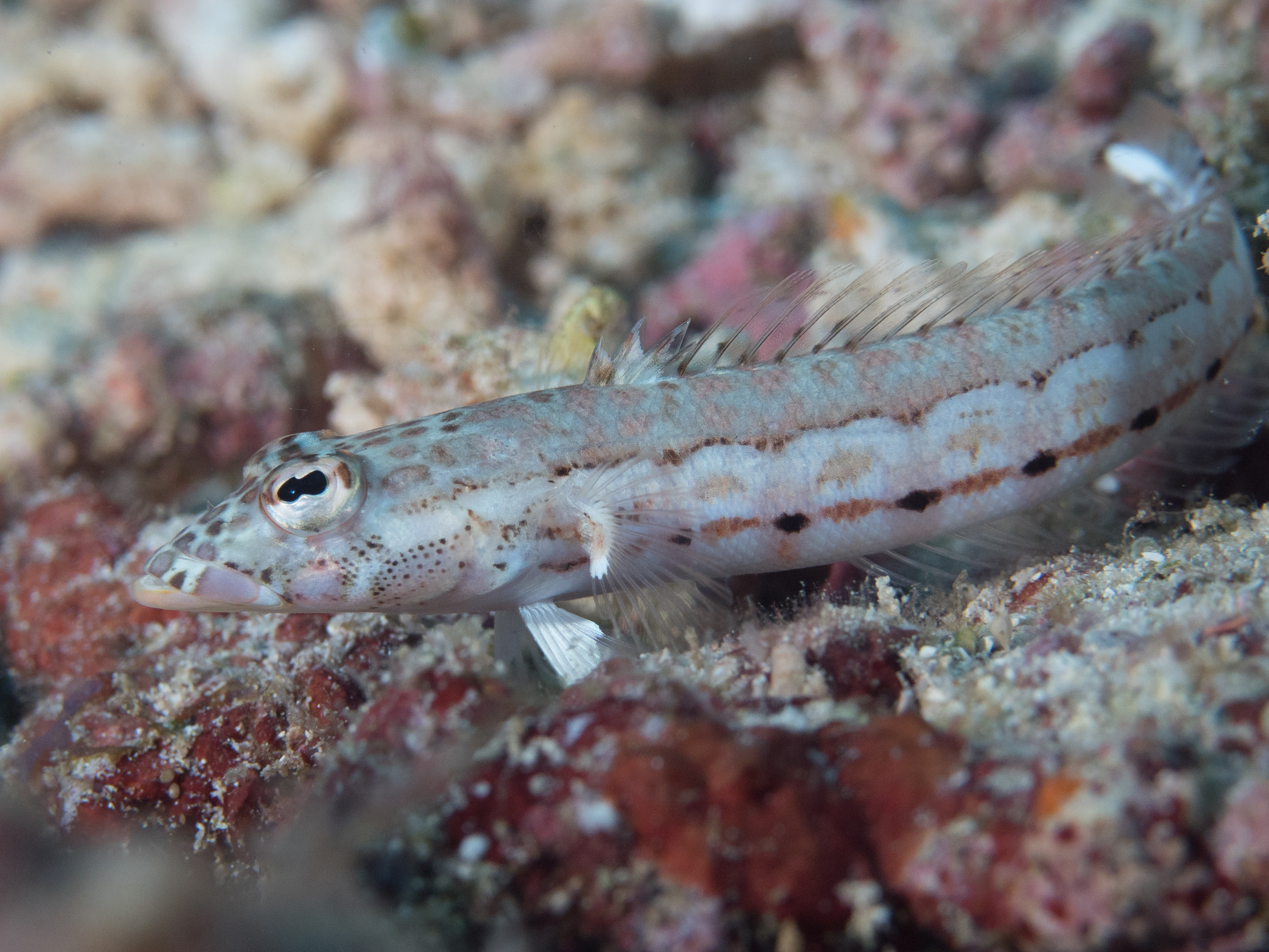

Conservation status
- Least Concern (IUCN 3.1)

Scientific classification
- Kingdom: Animalia
- Phylum: Chordata
- Class: Actinopterygii
- Order: Labriformes
- Family: Pinguipedidae
- Genus: Parapercis
- Species: P. multiplicata

Binomial name
- Parapercis multiplicata J. E. Randall, 1984

= Parapercis multiplicata =

Species of ray-finned fish

Parapercis multiplicata, the redbarred sandperch, is a ray-finned fish species in the sandperch family, Pinguipedidae. It is found Western Pacific, from southern Japan to the Great Barrier Reef off of Australia, east to Pitcairn Island, and west to Western Australia. This species reaches a length of 15 cm (5.9 in).
