= Parapercis dongshaensis =

Scientific classification
- Kingdom: Animalia
- Phylum: Chordata
- Class: Actinopterygii
- Order: Labriformes
- Family: Pinguipedidae
- Genus: Parapercis
- Species: P. dongshaensis

Binomial name
- Parapercis dongshaensis I. S. Chen, T. H. Tsai & S. L. Hsu, 2014

Species of ray-finned fish

Parapercis dongshaensis is a species of ray-finned fish in the sandperch family, Pinguipedidae. It is found in the South China Sea near Dongsha Island.

== Description ==
Parapercis dongshaensis can reach a standard length of 11.1 centimetres (4.4 in).
