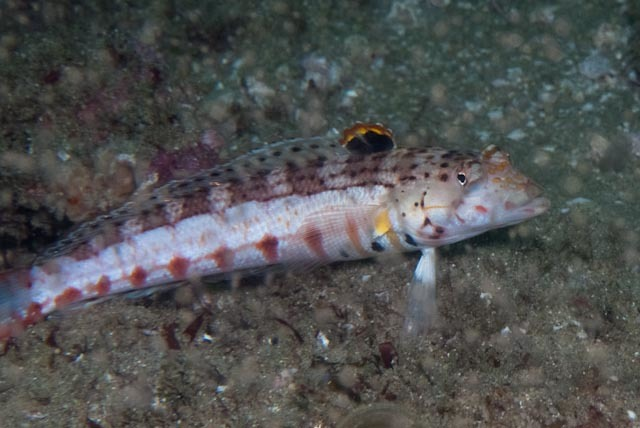

Conservation status
- Least Concern (IUCN 3.1)

Scientific classification
- Kingdom: Animalia
- Phylum: Chordata
- Class: Actinopterygii
- Order: Labriformes
- Family: Pinguipedidae
- Genus: Parapercis
- Species: P. punctulata

Binomial name
- Parapercis punctulata G. Cuvier, 1829

= Parapercis punctulata =

Species of ray-finned fish

Parapercis punctulata, the spotted sandperch, is a ray-finned fish species in the sandperch family Pinguipedidae. It is found in the Western Indian Ocean, including in the Seychelles, the Amirantes, Mozambique, Mauritius, and northern Natal, South Africa. It was recently recorded in Réunion. The species reaches a length of 13.0 cm (5.1 in).
