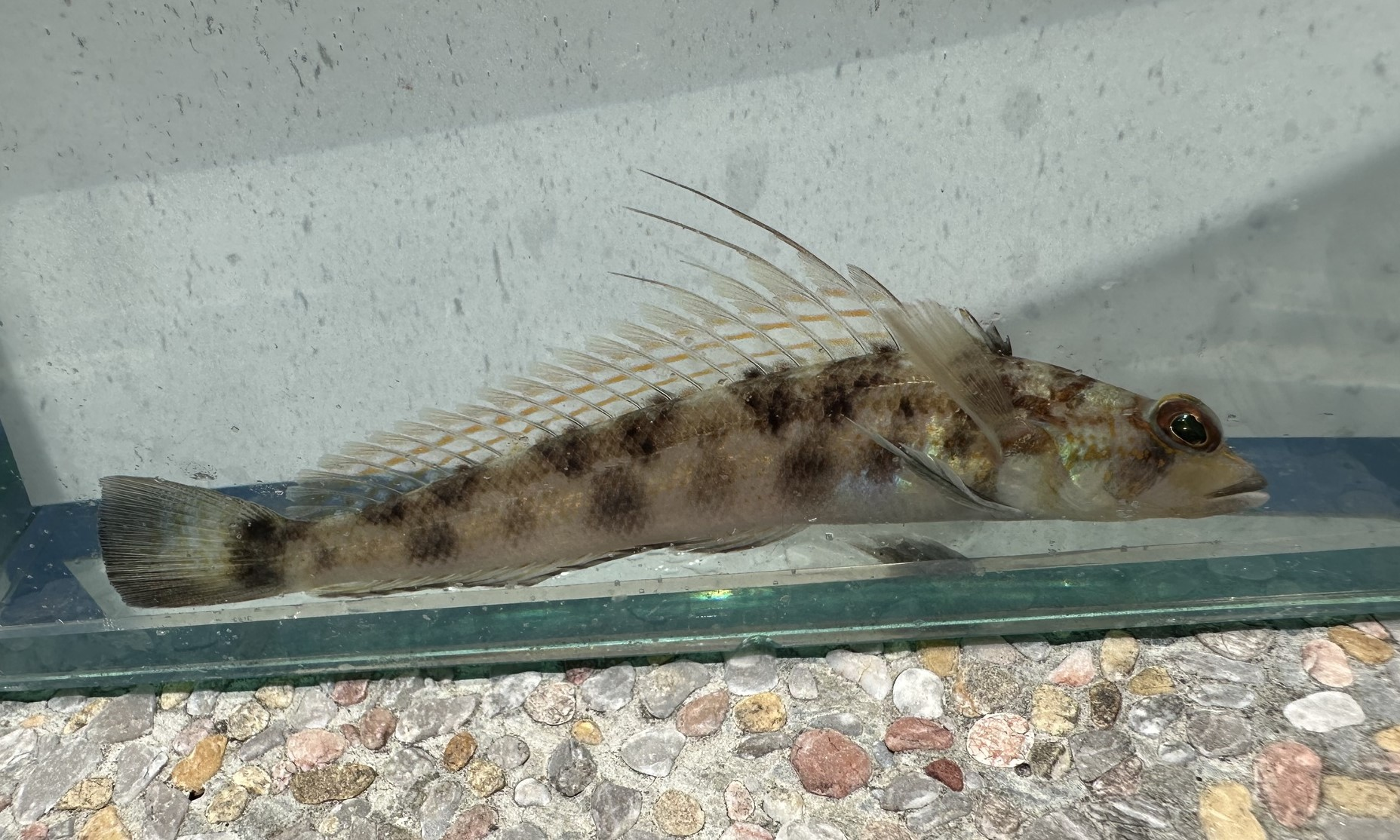

Scientific classification
- Domain: Eukaryota
- Kingdom: Animalia
- Phylum: Chordata
- Class: Actinopterygii
- Order: Labriformes
- Family: Pinguipedidae
- Genus: Parapercis
- Species: P. filamentosa

Binomial name
- Parapercis filamentosa (Steindachner, 1878)

Synonyms
- Percis filamentosa Steindachner, 1878; Parapercis hainanensis Lin, 1933; Parapercis longifilis Herre, 1944

= Parapercis filamentosa =

Species of ray-finned fish

Parapercis filamentosa, the threadfin sandperch, is a species of ray-finned fish in the sandperch family, Pinguipedidae. It is found in the western Pacific Ocean including Hainan, China and south to Thailand and Indonesia.

== Description ==
Parapercis filamentosa reaches a total length of 18.0 cm (7.1 in).
