= Parapercis striolata =

Conservation status
- Least Concern (IUCN 3.1)

Scientific classification
- Kingdom: Animalia
- Phylum: Chordata
- Class: Actinopterygii
- Order: Labriformes
- Family: Pinguipedidae
- Genus: Parapercis
- Species: P. striolata

Binomial name
- Parapercis striolata (M. C. W. Weber, 1913)

Synonyms
- Neopercis striolata Weber, 1913; Neopercis mimaseana Kamohara, 1937; Parapercis mimaseana (Kamohara, 1937)

Species of ray-finned fish

Parapercis striolata is a species of ray-finned fish in the sandperch family, Pinguipedidae. It is found in the western-central Pacific Oean from Japan to Australia and in the eastern Indian Ocean from Australia and Indonesia.

== Description ==
Parapercis striolata can reach a standard length of 20.0 centimetres (7.9 in).
