= Yellow weaver =

Yellow weaver may refer to:

- Yellow weaver (fish) – a marine fish from New Zealand.
- Eastern golden weaver – Bird in the family Ploceidae from eastern and southern Africa
- Finn's weaver– A species of weaver bird found in the Ganges and Brahmaputra valleys in India and Nepal
