= Parapercis okamurai =

Scientific classification
- Kingdom: Animalia
- Phylum: Chordata
- Class: Actinopterygii
- Order: Labriformes
- Family: Pinguipedidae
- Genus: Parapercis
- Species: P. okamurai

Binomial name
- Parapercis okamurai Kamohara, 1960

Species of ray-finned fish

Parapercis okamurai, the yellow sandperch, is a species of ray-finned fish in the sandperch family, Pinguipedidae. It is found off Taiwan and Japan.

== Description ==
Parapercis okamurai can reach a standard length of 13.0 centimetres (5.1 in).

== Etymology ==
The fish is named in honor of Osama Okamura, of Kyoto University in Japan, who helped collect the type specimen with fellow graduate student Kunio Amaoka.
