= Parapercis phenax =

Scientific classification
- Kingdom: Animalia
- Phylum: Chordata
- Class: Actinopterygii
- Order: Labriformes
- Family: Pinguipedidae
- Genus: Parapercis
- Species: P. phenax

Binomial name
- Parapercis phenax J. E. Randall & Yamakawa, 2006

Species of ray-finned fish

Parapercis phenax is a ray-finned fish species in the sandperch family, Pinguipedidae. It is found in Japan. This species reaches a length of 18.0 cm (7.1 in).
