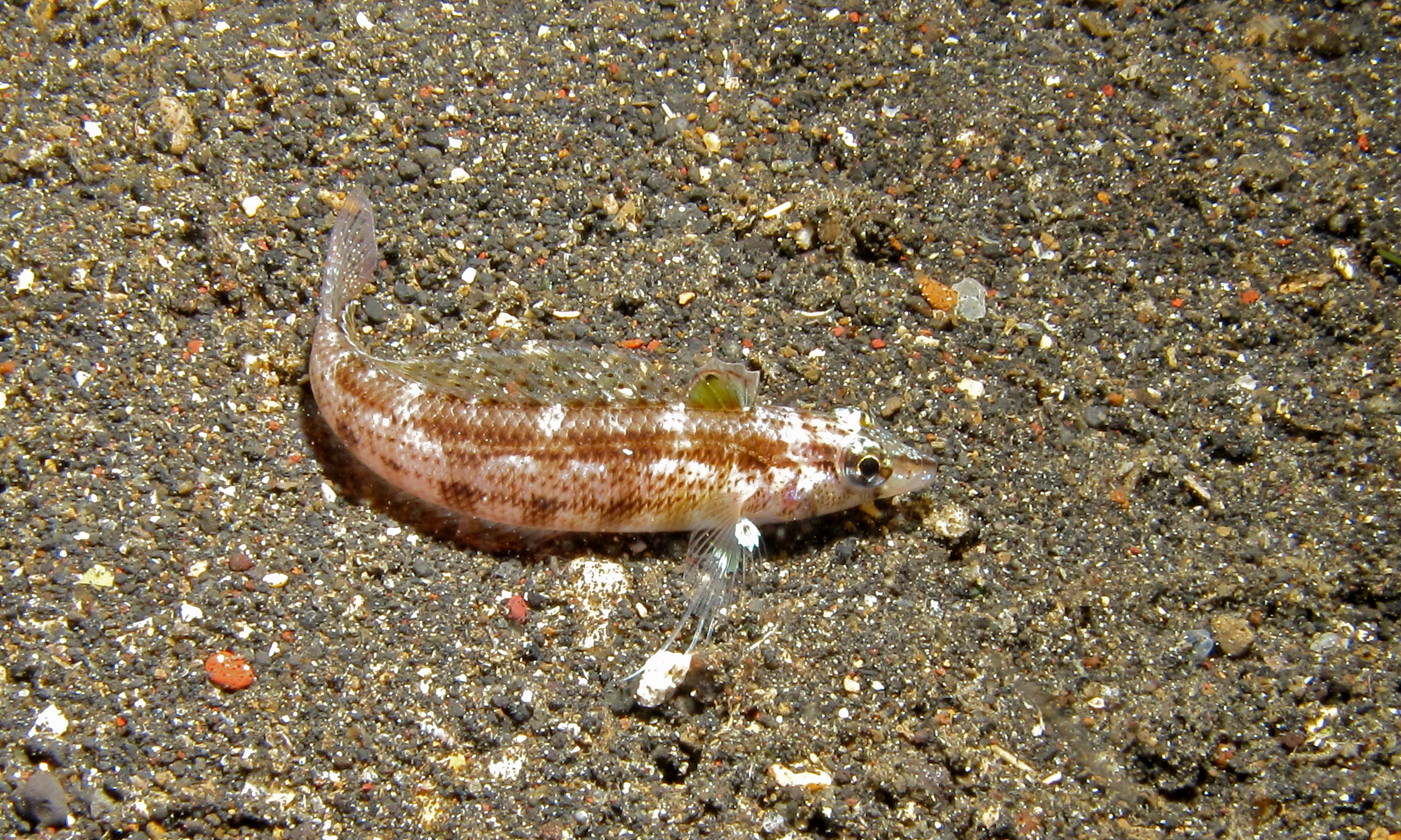

Scientific classification
- Domain: Eukaryota
- Kingdom: Animalia
- Phylum: Chordata
- Class: Actinopterygii
- Order: Labriformes
- Family: Pinguipedidae
- Genus: Parapercis
- Species: P. lineopunctata

Binomial name
- Parapercis lineopunctata J. E. Randall, 2003

= Parapercis lineopunctata =

Species of ray-finned fish

Parapercis lineopunctata, the nosestripe sandperch, is a ray-finned fish species in the sandperch family, Pinguipedidae. It is found in the islands of Sumatra, Sulawesi, the Philippines, in Australia, on the Great Barrier Reef, the Solomon Islands and remote Lord Howe Island. This species reaches a length of 7.4 cm (2.9 in).
