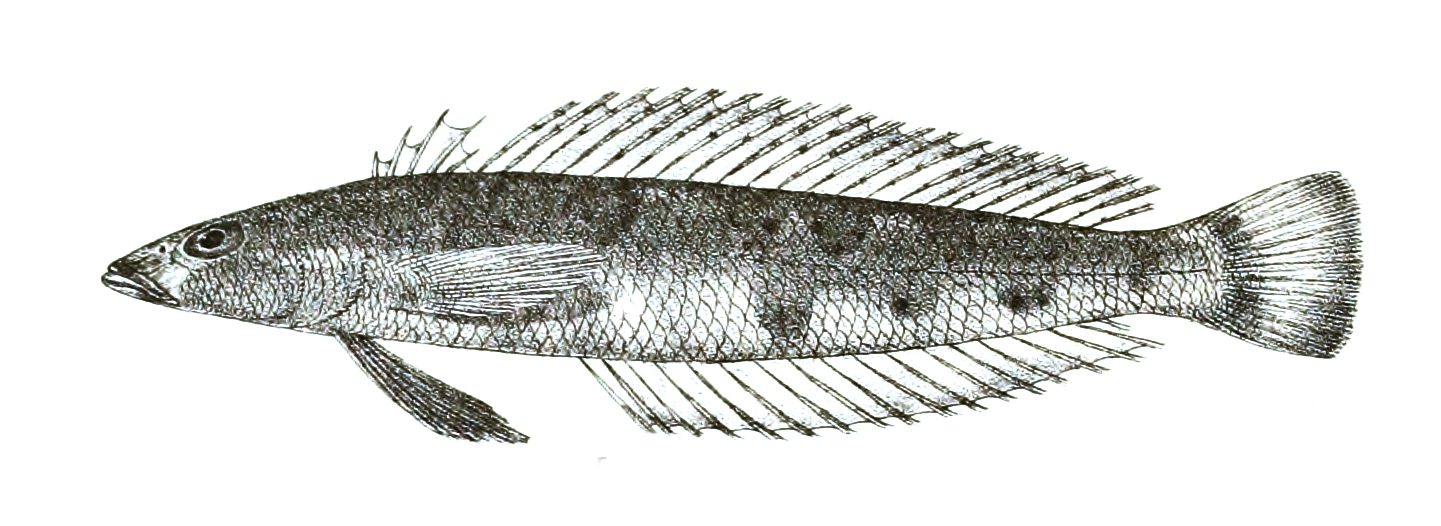

Scientific classification
- Domain: Eukaryota
- Kingdom: Animalia
- Phylum: Chordata
- Class: Actinopterygii
- Order: Labriformes
- Family: Pinguipedidae
- Genus: Parapercis
- Species: P. punctata

Binomial name
- Parapercis punctata G. Cuvier, 1829

= Parapercis punctata =

Species of ray-finned fish

Parapercis punctata is a ray-finned fish species in the sandperch family, Pinguipedidae. It is found in the Western Indian Ocean. This species reaches a length of 14.3 cm (5.6 in).
