= Parapercis =

- Parapercis millepunctata

Scientific classification
- Kingdom: Animalia
- Phylum: Chordata
- Class: Actinopterygii
- Division: Teleostei
- Order: Labriformes
- Family: Pinguipedidae
- Genus: Parapercis; Bleeker, 1863

Type species
- Sciaena cylindrica Bloch, 1792

Synonyms
- Chilias Ogilby, 1910; Neopercis Steindachner, 1884; Neosillago Castelnau, 1875; Osurus Jordan & Evermann, 1903; Parapercichthys Whitley & Phillipps, 1939; Parapercis Steindachner, 1884; Percis Bloch & Schneider, 1801

Genus of ray-finned fishes

Parapercis is a genus of sandperches belonging to the family Pinguipedidae.

== Species ==
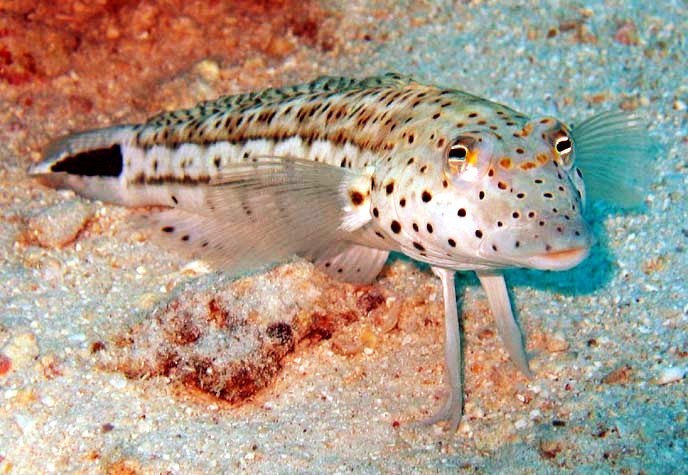
Parapercis hexophtalma

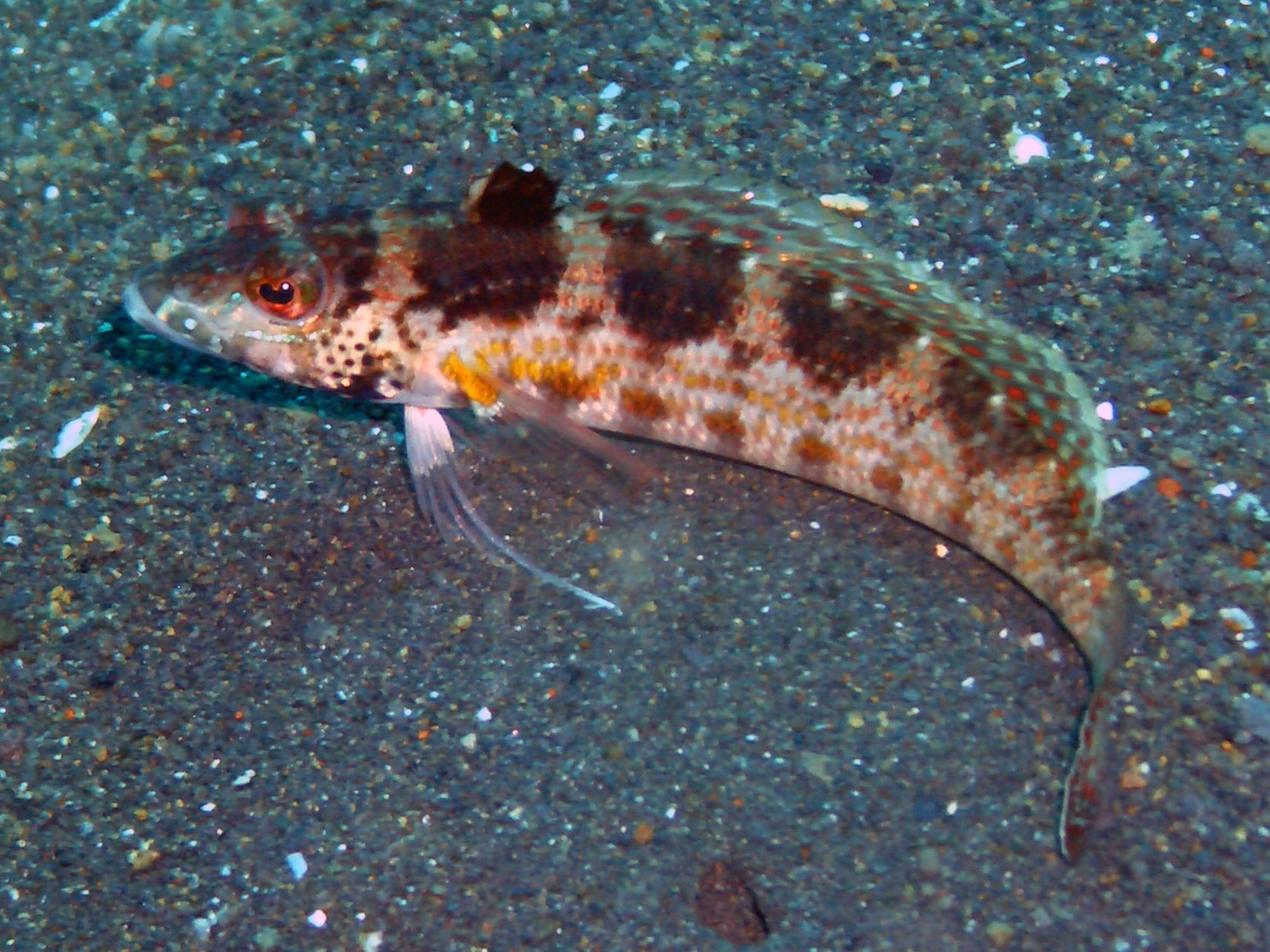
Parapercis snyderi

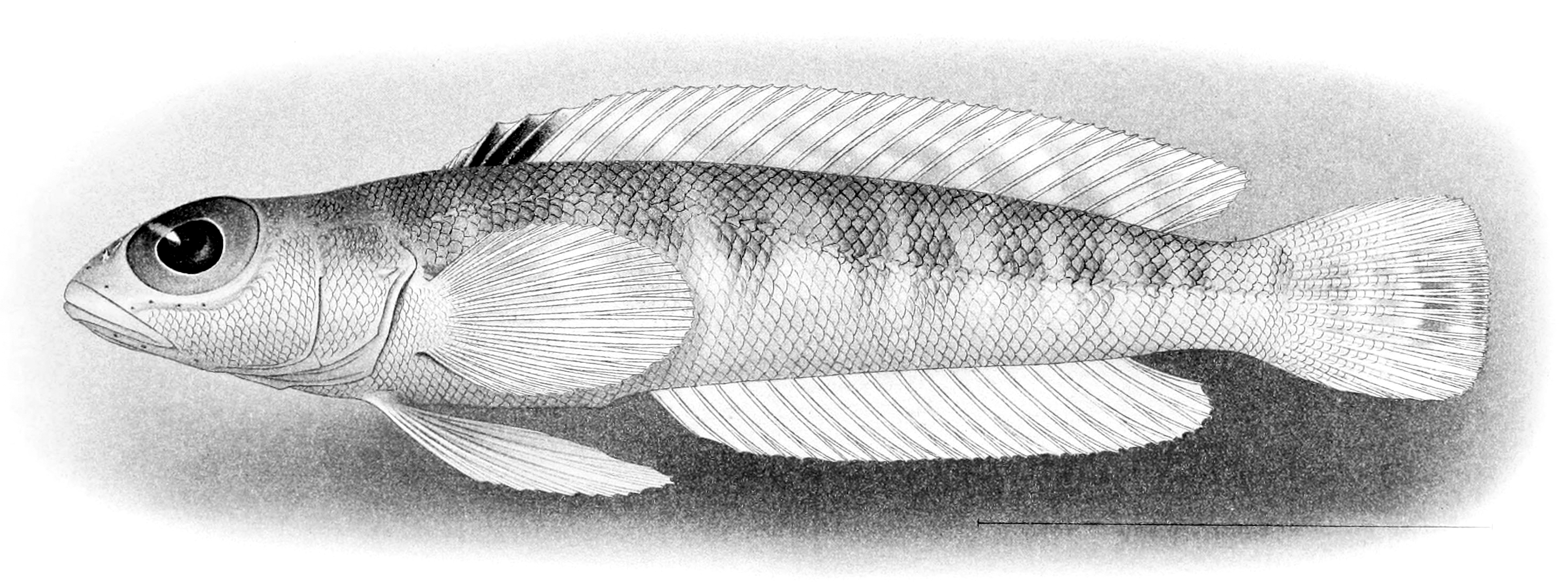
Parapercis roseoviridis

There are currently 93 recognized species in this genus:

- Parapercis albipinna J. E. Randall, 2008
- Parapercis albiventer H.-C. Ho, Heemstra & Imamura, 2014 (Whitebelly sandperch)
- Parapercis alboguttata (Günther, 1872) (Whitespot sandsmelt)
- Parapercis algrahami Johnson & Worthington Wilmer, 2018
- Parapercis allporti Günther, 1876 (Barred grubfish)
- Parapercis altipinnis Ho & van Heden, 2017
- Parapercis annamalai Yosuva, Ho, Jeyapragash & Saravanakuamr, 2020
- Parapercis atlantica (Vaillant, 1887)
- Parapercis aurantiaca Döderlein (de), 1884
- Parapercis australis J. E. Randall, 2003
- Parapercis banoni J. E. Randall & Yamakawa, 2006
- Parapercis basimaculata J. E. Randall, Senou & Yoshino, 2008
- Parapercis bicoloripes Prokofiev, 2010
- Parapercis bimacula G. R. Allen & Erdmann, 2012 (Redbar sandperch)
- Parapercis binivirgata (Waite, 1904) (Redbanded weever)
- Parapercis binotata Allen & Erdmann, 2017
- Parapercis biordinis G. R. Allen, 1976
- Parapercis caudopellucida Johnson & Motomura, 2017
- Parapercis clathrata W. Ogilby, 1910 (Latticed sandperch)
- Parapercis colemani J. E. Randall & Francis, 1993
- Parapercis colias (Forster, 1801) (New Zealand blue cod)
- Parapercis compressa J. E. Randall, 2008
- Parapercis cylindrica (Bloch, 1792) (Cylindrical sandperch)
- Parapercis decemfasciata (V. Franz, 1910)
- Parapercis diagonalis J. E. Randall, 2008 (Diagonal sandperch)
- Parapercis diplospilus M. F. Gomon, 1980 (Doublespot grubfish)
- Parapercis dockinsi J. E. McCosker, 1971
- Parapercis dongshaensis I. S. Chen, T. H. Tsai & S. L. Hsu, 2014
- Parapercis filamentosa (Steindachner, 1878) (Threadfin sandperch)
- Parapercis flavescens Fourmanoir & Rivaton, 1979
- Parapercis flavipinna Johnson & Motomura, 2017
- Parapercis flavolabiata J. W. Johnson, 2006 (Yellowlip grubfish)
- Parapercis flavolineata J. E. Randall, 2008 (Yellowline sandperch)
- Parapercis fuscolineata Fourmanoir, 1985
- Parapercis gilliesii F. W. Hutton, 1879 (Yellow weaver)
- Parapercis haackei Steindachner, 1884 (Wavy grubfish)
- Parapercis hexophtalma G. Cuvier, 1829 (Speckled sandperch)
- Parapercis hoi Johnson & Motomura, 2017
- Parapercis imamurai Johnson & Worthington Wilmer, 2018
- Parapercis johnsoni H. C. Ho, 2015 (Polynesian sandperch)
- Parapercis kamoharai L. P. Schultz, 1966
- Parapercis katoi J. E. Randall, Senou & Yoshino, 2008
- Parapercis kentingensis H.-C. Ho, C. H. Chang & K. T. Shao, 2012 (Kenting sandperch)
- Parapercis lata J. E. Randall & J. E. McCosker, 2002 (Y-barred sandperch)
- Parapercis lembehensis Allen, Erdmann & Peristiwady, 2024
- Parapercis lineopunctata J. E. Randall, 2003 (Nosestripe sandperch)
- Parapercis lutevittata Y. C. Liao, T. Y. Cheng & K. T. Shao, 2011 (Yellow-striped sandperch)
- Parapercis macrophthalma (Pietschmann, 1911) (Narrow barred grubfish)
- Parapercis maculata Bloch & Schneider, 1801 (Harlequin sandperch)
- Parapercis maramara Sparks & Z. H. Baldwin, 2012
- Parapercis maritzi M. E. Anderson, 1992
- Parapercis millepunctata Günther, 1860 (Black dotted sandperch)
- Parapercis moki H.-C. Ho & J. W. Johnson, 2013 (Mok's sandperch)
- Parapercis multifasciata Döderlein (de), 1884 (Gold-birdled sandsmelt)
- Parapercis multiplicata J. E. Randall, 1984 (Redbarred sandperch)
- Parapercis muronis (S. Tanaka, 1918)
- Parapercis naevosa Serventy, 1937
- Parapercis natator J. E. Randall, Senou & Yoshino, 2008
- Parapercis nebulosa (Quoy & Gaimard, 1825) (Barred sandperch)
- Parapercis nigrodorsalis J. W. Johnson, Struthers & Worthington Wilmer, 2014 (Blackfin sandperch)
- Parapercis okamurai Kamohara, 1960 (Yellow sandperch)
- Parapercis ommatura D. S. Jordan & Snyder, 1902
- Parapercis pacifica Imamura & Yoshino, 2007
- Parapercis phenax J. E. Randall & Yamakawa, 2006
- Parapercis pogonoskii Johnson & Worthington Wilmer, 2018
- Parapercis pulchella (Temminck & Schlegel, 1843) (Harlequin sandsmelt)
- Parapercis punctata G. Cuvier, 1829
- Parapercis punctulata G. Cuvier, 1829 (Spotted sandperch)
- Parapercis queenslandica Imamura & Yoshino, 2007
- Parapercis ramsayi Steindachner, 1883 (Spotted grubfish)
- Parapercis randalli H.-C. Ho & K. T. Shao, 2010
- Parapercis robinsoni Fowler, 1929 (Smallscale grubfish)
- Parapercis roseoviridis (C. H. Gilbert, 1905)
- Parapercis rota Sparks, Chaloux, Schelly, Gruber, Sparks & Phillips, 2021
- Parapercis rubricaudalis Johnson & Motomura, 2017
- Parapercis rubromaculata H.-C. Ho, C. H. Chang & K. T. Shao, 2012 (Redspot sandperch)
- Parapercis rufa J. E. Randall, 2001 (Red sandperch)
- Parapercis sagma G. R. Allen & Erdmann, 2012 (Saddled sandperch)
- Parapercis schauinslandii Steindachner, 1900 (Redspotted sandperch)
- Parapercis sexfasciata Temminck & Schlegel, 1843 (Grub fish)
- Parapercis sexlorata J. W. Johnson, 2006 (Sixstrap grubfish)
- Parapercis shaoi J. E. Randall, 2008
- Parapercis signata J. E. Randall, 1984 (Blackflag sandperch)
- Parapercis simulata L. P. Schultz, 1968
- Parapercis snyderi D. S. Jordan & Starks, 1905 (U-mark sandperch)
- Parapercis soliorta Johnson & Motomura, 2017
- Parapercis somaliensis L. P. Schultz, 1968 (Somali sandperch)
- Parapercis stricticeps (De Vis, 1884) (White-streaked grubfish)
- Parapercis striolata (M. C. W. Weber, 1913)
- Parapercis tetracantha (Lacépède, 1802) (Reticulated sandperch)
- Parapercis vittafrons J. E. Randall, 2008 (Bandhead sandperch)
- Parapercis xanthogramma Imamura & Yoshino, 2007
- Parapercis xanthozona (Bleeker, 1849) (Yellowbar sandperch)
