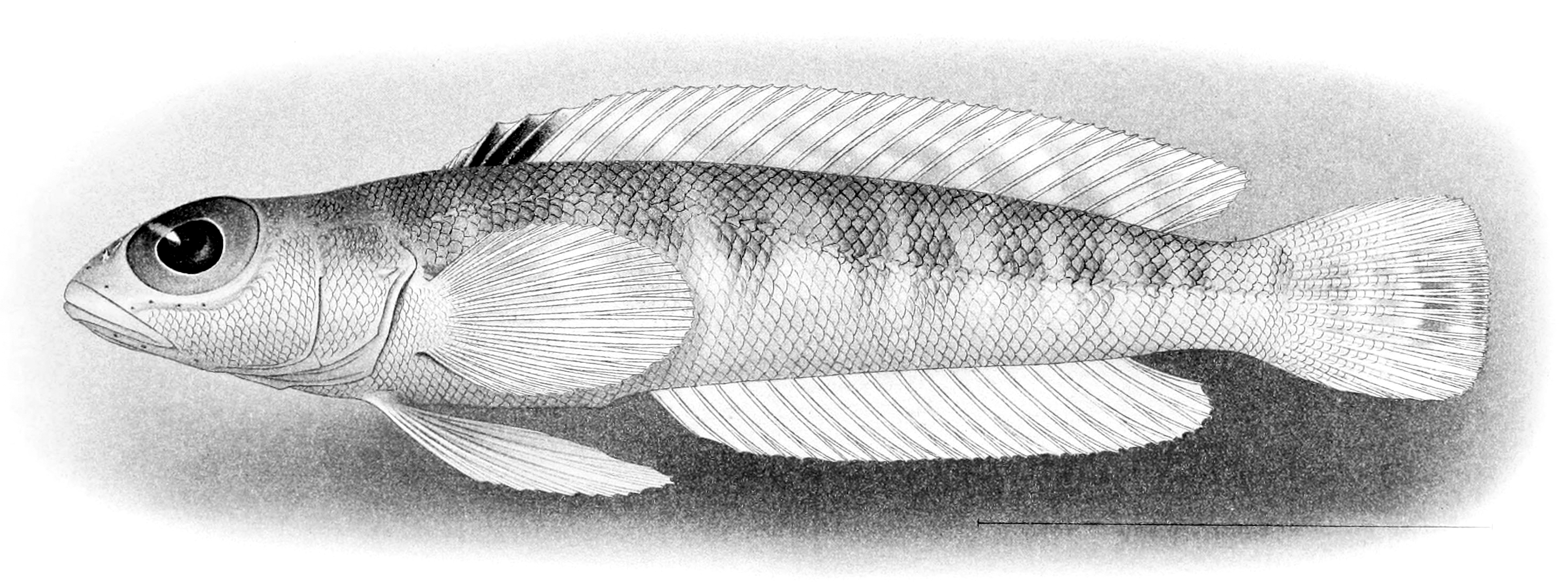

Scientific classification
- Domain: Eukaryota
- Kingdom: Animalia
- Phylum: Chordata
- Class: Actinopterygii
- Order: Labriformes
- Family: Pinguipedidae
- Genus: Parapercis
- Species: P. roseoviridis

Binomial name
- Parapercis roseoviridis (C. H. Gilbert, 1905)

Synonyms
- Neopercis roseoviridis Gilbert, 1905

= Parapercis roseoviridis =

Species of ray-finned fish

Parapercis roseoviridis is a species of ray-finned fish in the sandperch family, Pinguipedidae. It is found in Hawaii.

== Description ==
Parapercis roseoviridis can reach a standard length of 15.9 centimetres (6.3 in).
