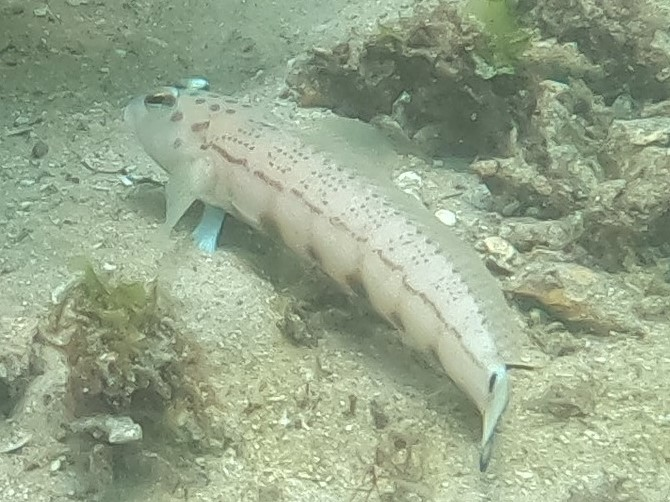

Scientific classification
- Kingdom: Animalia
- Phylum: Chordata
- Class: Actinopterygii
- Order: Labriformes
- Family: Pinguipedidae
- Genus: Parapercis
- Species: P. ramsayi

Binomial name
- Parapercis ramsayi Steindachner, 1883

= Parapercis ramsayi =

Species of ray-finned fish

Parapercis ramsayi, the spotted grubfish, is a species of ray-finned fish in the sandperch family, Pinguipedidae. It is found in the eastern Indian Ocean around southern Western Australia and South Australia.

== Description ==
Parapercis ramsayi reaches a total length of 10.0 cm (3.9 in).

== Etymology ==
The fish is named almost certainly in honour of zoologist Edward Pierson Ramsay (1842–1916), the Curator of the Australian Museum.
