= Parapercis simulata =

Scientific classification
- Domain: Eukaryota
- Kingdom: Animalia
- Phylum: Chordata
- Class: Actinopterygii
- Order: Labriformes
- Family: Pinguipedidae
- Genus: Parapercis
- Species: P. simulata

Binomial name
- Parapercis simulata L. P. Schultz, 1968

Species of ray-finned fish

Parapercis simulata is a species of ray-finned fish in the sandperch family, Pinguipedidae. It is found in the Red Sea and the western Indian Ocean.
