= Parapercis decemfasciata =

Scientific classification
- Domain: Eukaryota
- Kingdom: Animalia
- Phylum: Chordata
- Class: Actinopterygii
- Order: Labriformes
- Family: Pinguipedidae
- Genus: Parapercis
- Species: P. decemfasciata

Binomial name
- Parapercis decemfasciata (V. Franz, 1910)

Synonyms
- Neopercis decemfasciata Franz, 1910

Species of ray-finned fish

Parapercis decemfasciata is a species of ray-finned fish in the sandperch family, Pinguipedidae. It is found in the Pacific Ocean from southern Japan, South Korea and Taiwan.

== Description ==
Parapercis decemfasciata can reach a standard length of 15.0 centimetres (5.9 in).
