= Parapercis dockinsi =

Scientific classification
- Kingdom: Animalia
- Phylum: Chordata
- Class: Actinopterygii
- Order: Labriformes
- Family: Pinguipedidae
- Genus: Parapercis
- Species: P. dockinsi

Binomial name
- Parapercis dockinsi J. E. McCosker, 1971

Species of ray-finned fish

Parapercis dockinsi is a ray-finned fish species in the sandperch family, Pinguipedidae. It is found in the Southeastern Pacific and is believed to be endemic to Juan Fernández Island. This species reaches a length of 17.2 cm (6.8 in).

== Etymology ==
The fish is named in honor of zoologist Donald M. Dockins (1930–1975), diver and specimen collector for Scripps Institution of Oceanography, described as the “intrepid captor of many of the type specimens”.
