= Parapercis somaliensis =

Conservation status
- Least Concern (IUCN 3.1)

Scientific classification
- Kingdom: Animalia
- Phylum: Chordata
- Class: Actinopterygii
- Order: Labriformes
- Family: Pinguipedidae
- Genus: Parapercis
- Species: P. somaliensis

Binomial name
- Parapercis somaliensis L. P. Schultz, 1968

Species of ray-finned fish

Parapercis somaliensis is a species of ray-finned fish in the sandperch family, Pinguipedidae. It is found in the western Indian Ocean.

== Description ==
Parapercis somaliensis reaches a total length of 15.0 cm (5.9 in).
