= Parapercis albipinna =

Scientific classification
- Domain: Eukaryota
- Kingdom: Animalia
- Phylum: Chordata
- Class: Actinopterygii
- Order: Labriformes
- Family: Pinguipedidae
- Genus: Parapercis
- Species: P. albipinna

Binomial name
- Parapercis albipinna J. E. Randall, 2008

Species of ray-finned fish

Parapercis albipinna is a ray-finned fish species in the sandperch family, Pinguipedidae. It is found in New Caledonia. This species reaches a length of 14.2 cm (5.6 in).
