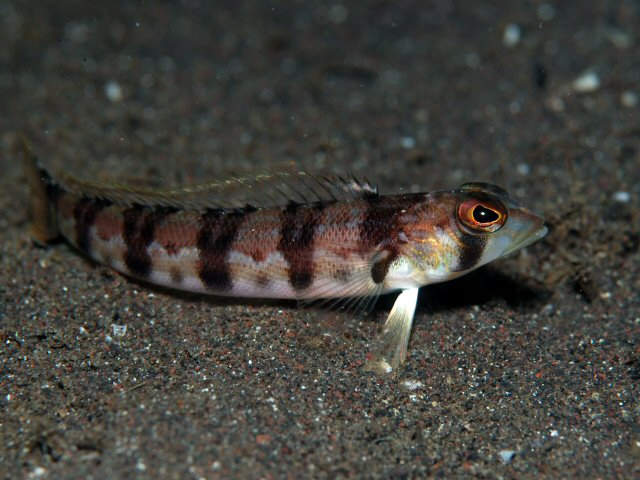

Scientific classification
- Domain: Eukaryota
- Kingdom: Animalia
- Phylum: Chordata
- Class: Actinopterygii
- Order: Labriformes
- Family: Pinguipedidae
- Genus: Parapercis
- Species: P. sexfasciata

Binomial name
- Parapercis sexfasciata (Temminck & Schlegel, 1843)

Synonyms
- Percis pulchella Temminck & Schlegel, 1843

= Parapercis sexfasciata =

Species of ray-finned fish

Parapercis sexfasciata, the grub fish, is a species of ray-finned fish in the sandperch family, Pinguipedidae. It is found in the western Pacific Ocean from southern Japan to Taiwan and Indonesia.

== Description ==
Parapercis sexfasciata reaches a total length of 12.0 cm (4.7 in).
