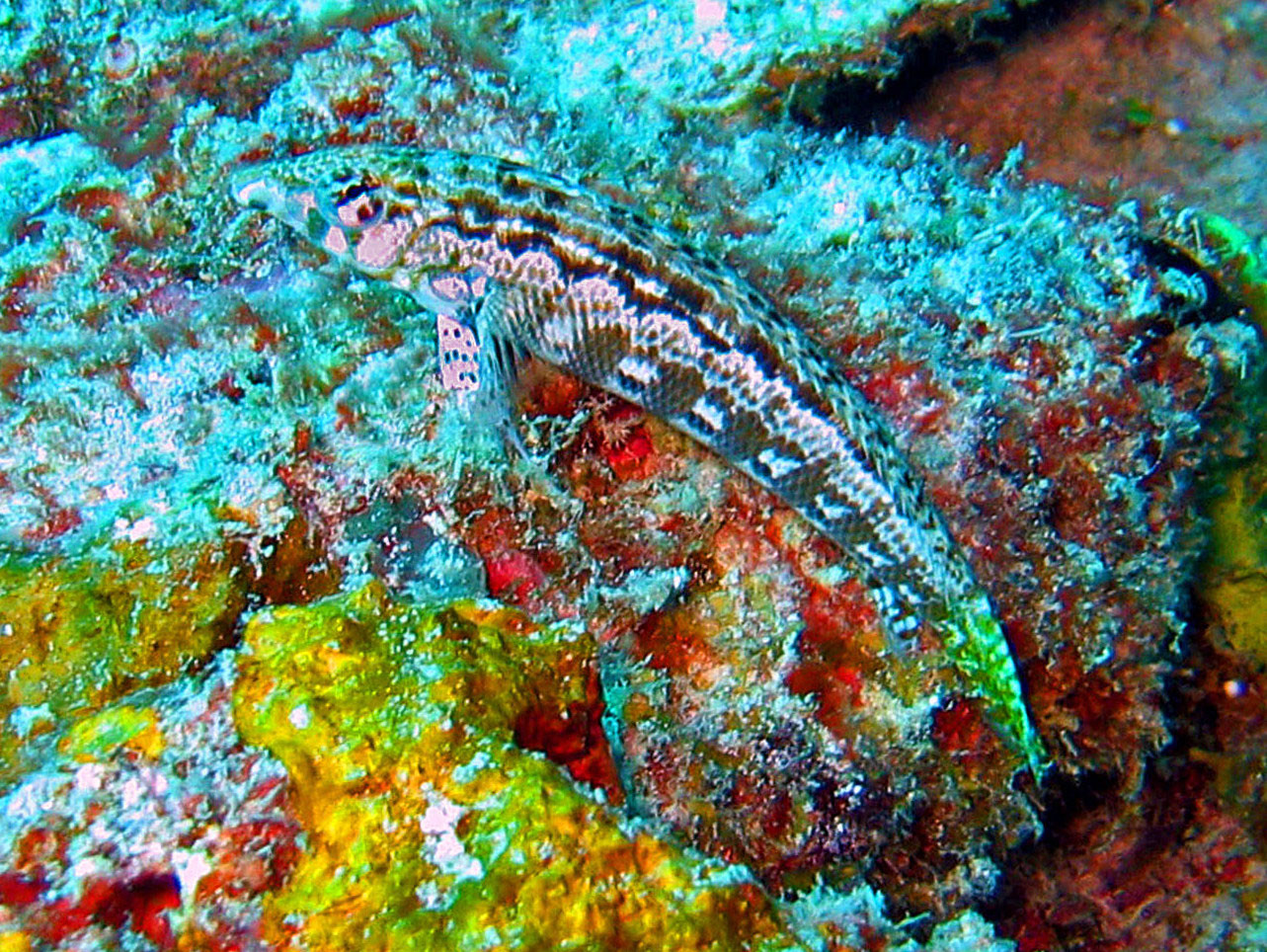
- Parapercis cylindrica in Sulawesi

Conservation status
- Least Concern (IUCN 3.1)

Scientific classification
- Kingdom: Animalia
- Phylum: Chordata
- Class: Actinopterygii
- Order: Labriformes
- Family: Pinguipedidae
- Genus: Parapercis
- Species: P. cylindrica

Binomial name
- Parapercis cylindrica (Bloch, 1792)

Synonyms
- Sciaena cylindrica Bloch, 1792; Chilias synaphodesmus Fowler, 1946

= Parapercis cylindrica =

Species of ray-finned fish

Parapercis cylindrica, the cylindrical sandperch, is a species of sandperch belonging to the family Pinguipedidae.

== Etymology ==
Genus Parapercis = Greek para, beside, near, compared with + Greek perkis, a fish, perch. Genus Parapercis fishes are closely related to perches, which belong to genus Perca.

== Description ==
Parapercis cylindrica can reach a length of 23 cm (9.1 in). It shows a series of quadrangular dark brown blotches along the body. The largest blotches are joined by dark brown stripes. A narrow dark brown bar is located below middle of eye. Caudal fin is usually yellowish.

== Distribution ==
This species can be found Western Pacific, from Australia to Fiji, southern Japan, northern Sulawesi and Marshall Islands.

== Habitat ==
Perapercis cylindrica is a species associated to shallow reef. It usually can be found in lagoon and seaward reefs on sand and seagrass, at depths between 1 and 20 m (0 and 70 ft).
