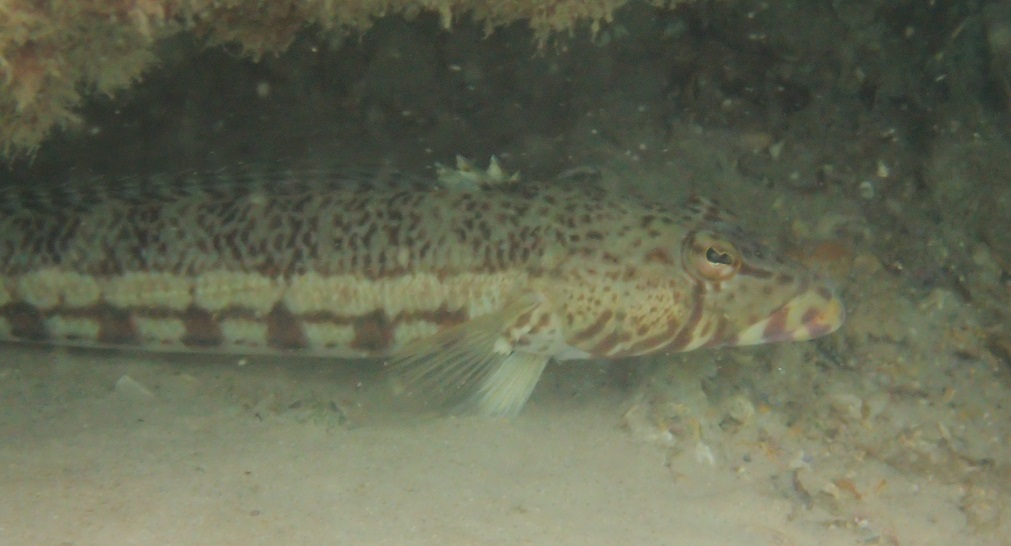

Scientific classification
- Domain: Eukaryota
- Kingdom: Animalia
- Phylum: Chordata
- Class: Actinopterygii
- Order: Labriformes
- Family: Pinguipedidae
- Genus: Parapercis
- Species: P. stricticeps

Binomial name
- Parapercis stricticeps (De Vis, 1884)

Synonyms
- Percis stricticeps De Vis, 1884

= Parapercis stricticeps =

Species of ray-finned fish

Parapercis stricticeps, the white-streaked grubfish, is a species of ray-finned fish in the sandperch family, Pinguipedidae. It is found off eastern Australia.

== Description ==
Parapercis stricticeps can reach a length of 18.0 centimetres (7.1 in) TL.
