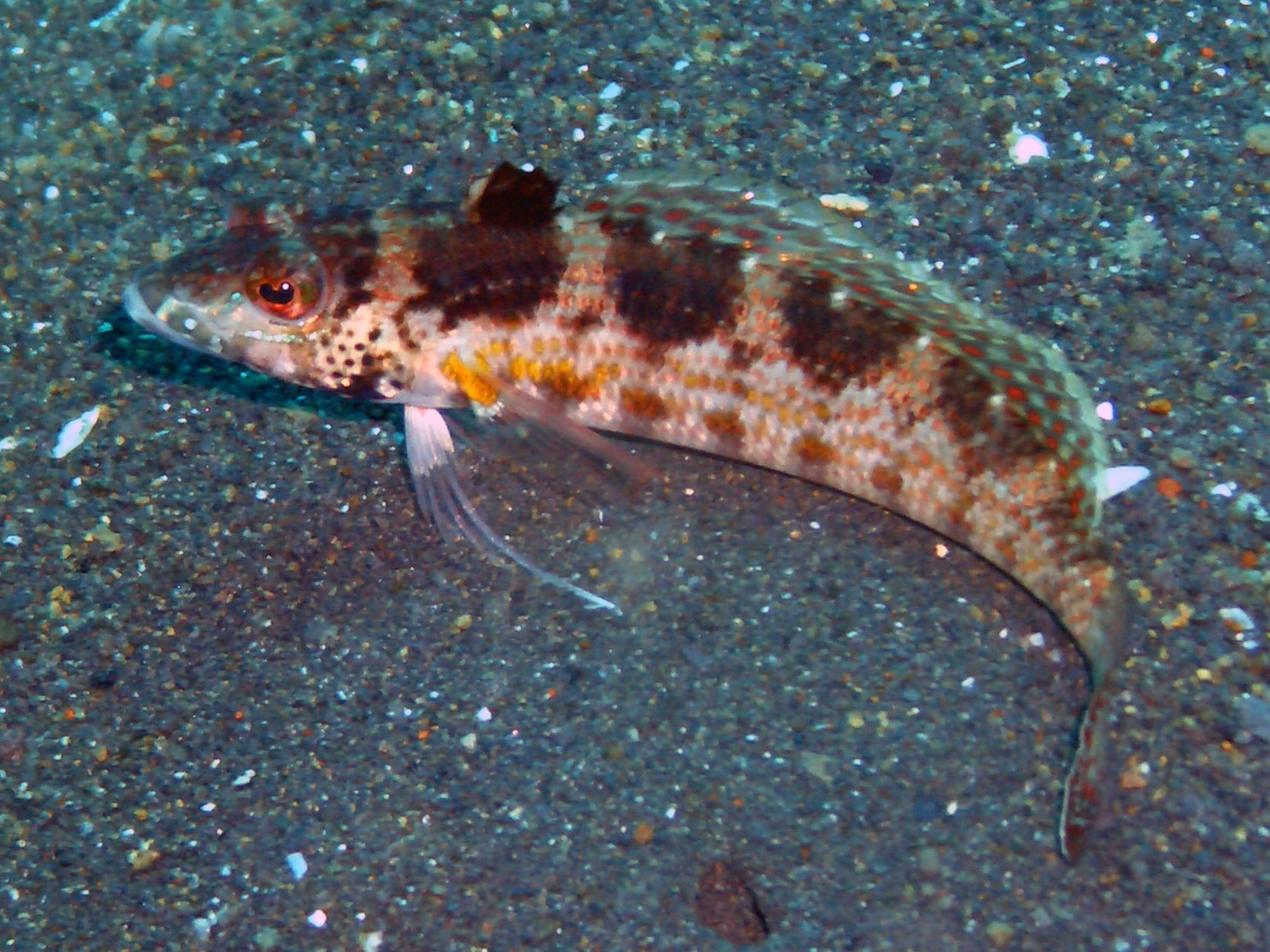

Conservation status
- Least Concern (IUCN 3.1)

Scientific classification
- Kingdom: Animalia
- Phylum: Chordata
- Class: Actinopterygii
- Order: Labriformes
- Family: Pinguipedidae
- Genus: Parapercis
- Species: P. snyderi

Binomial name
- Parapercis snyderi Jordan & Starks, 1905

= Parapercis snyderi =

Snyder's grubfish

Species of ray-finned fish

Parapercis snyderi, commonly known as Snyder's grubfish or U-mark sandperch, is a marine ray-finned fish native to the waters off northern Australia and Indonesia. The specific name honours the ichthyologist John Otterbein Snyder who collected the type specimen with David Starr Jordan, one of the co-describers of the species, at Nagasaki.
