= Parapercis flavolineata =

Scientific classification
- Domain: Eukaryota
- Kingdom: Animalia
- Phylum: Chordata
- Class: Actinopterygii
- Order: Labriformes
- Family: Pinguipedidae
- Genus: Parapercis
- Species: P. flavolineata

Binomial name
- Parapercis flavolineata J. E. Randall, 2008

Species of ray-finned fish

Parapercis flavolineata, the yellowline sandperch, is a ray-finned fish species in the sandperch family, Pinguipedidae. It is found in Indonesia. This species reaches a length of 14.0 cm (5.5 in).
