= Parapercis allporti =

Scientific classification
- Domain: Eukaryota
- Kingdom: Animalia
- Phylum: Chordata
- Class: Actinopterygii
- Order: Labriformes
- Family: Pinguipedidae
- Genus: Parapercis
- Species: P. allporti

Binomial name
- Parapercis allporti Günther, 1876

Species of ray-finned fish

Parapercis allporti, the barred grubfish, is a ray-finned fish species in the sandperch family, Pinguipedidae. It is found in the Eastern Indian Ocean, in southern Australia, from South Australia to New South Wales and Tasmania. This species reaches a length of 33.0 cm (13.0 in).
