= Parapercis diplospilus =

Scientific classification
- Domain: Eukaryota
- Kingdom: Animalia
- Phylum: Chordata
- Class: Actinopterygii
- Order: Labriformes
- Family: Pinguipedidae
- Genus: Parapercis
- Species: P. diplospilus

Binomial name
- Parapercis diplospilus Gomon, 1980

Species of ray-finned fish

Parapercis diplospilus, the doublespot grubfish, is a species of ray-finned fish in the sandperch family, Pinguipedidae. It is found in the Indo-West Pacific Ocean: from western Australia to the Indo-Australian archipelago, and the Philippines.

== Description ==
Parapercis diplospilus can reach a total length of 10.0 centimetres (3.9 in).
