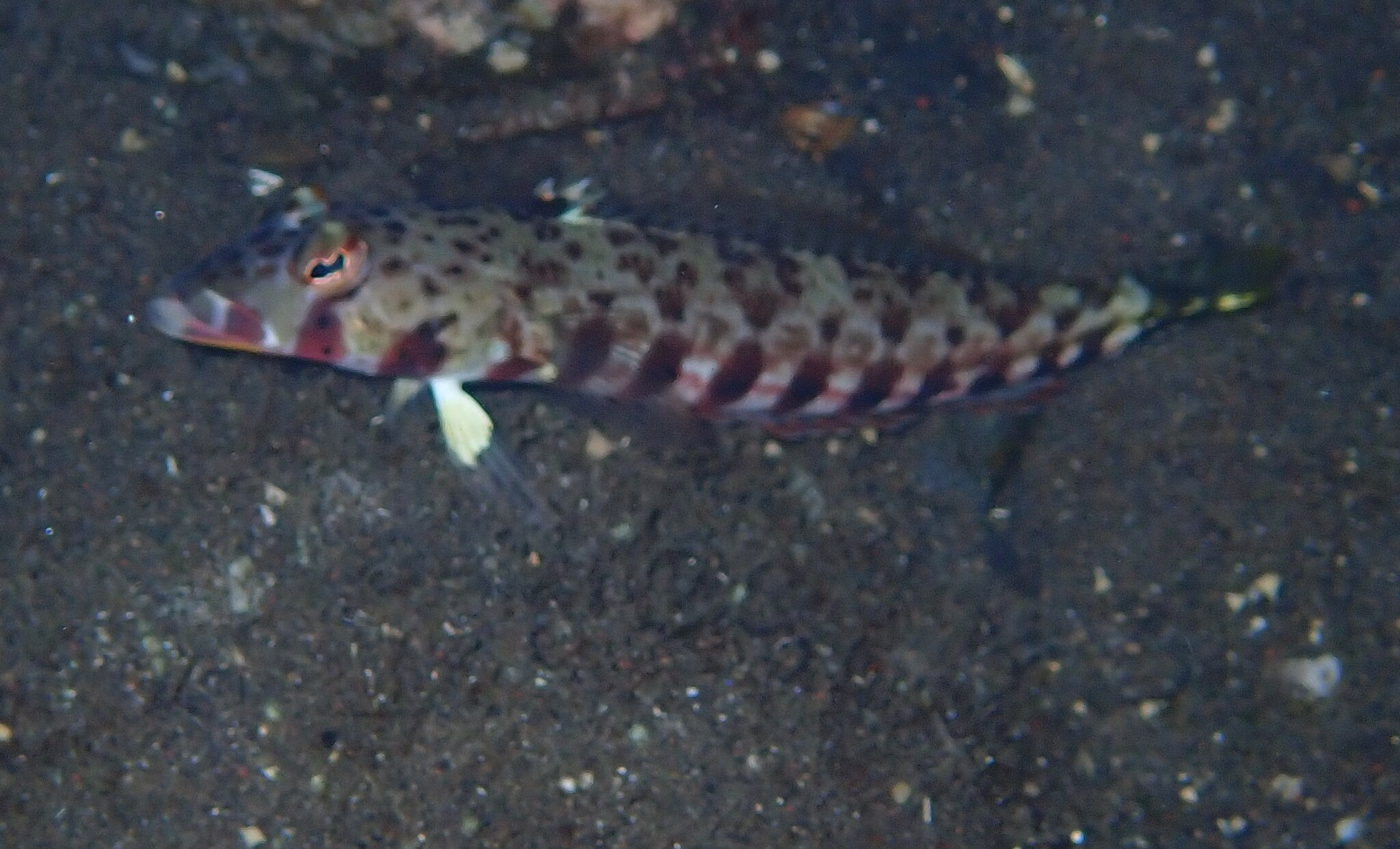

Scientific classification
- Domain: Eukaryota
- Kingdom: Animalia
- Phylum: Chordata
- Class: Actinopterygii
- Order: Labriformes
- Family: Pinguipedidae
- Genus: Parapercis
- Species: P. bimacula

Binomial name
- Parapercis bimacula G. R. Allen & Erdmann, 2012

= Parapercis bimacula =

Species of ray-finned fish

Parapercis bimacula, commonly known as the redbar sandperch, is a species of ray-finned fish in the sandperch family, Pinguipedidae. It is found from the Andaman Islands to Indonesia.

== Description ==
Parapercis bimacula reaches a standard length of 10.0 cm (3.9 in)
