= Parapercis diagonalis =

Scientific classification
- Domain: Eukaryota
- Kingdom: Animalia
- Phylum: Chordata
- Class: Actinopterygii
- Order: Labriformes
- Family: Pinguipedidae
- Genus: Parapercis
- Species: P. diagonalis

Binomial name
- Parapercis diagonalis J. E. Randall, 2008

Species of ray-finned fish

Parapercis diagonalis, the diagonal sandperch, is a ray-finned fish species in the sandperch family, Pinguipedidae. It is found in Indonesia. This species reaches a length of 15.0 cm (5.9 in).
