= Parapercis maramara =

Scientific classification
- Kingdom: Animalia
- Phylum: Chordata
- Class: Actinopterygii
- Order: Labriformes
- Family: Pinguipedidae
- Genus: Parapercis
- Species: P. maramara

Binomial name
- Parapercis maramara Sparks & Z. H. Baldwin, 2012

Species of ray-finned fish

Parapercis maramara is a species of fish native to Madagascar. In taxonomy, the maramara is a ray-finned fish of the sandperch (Pinguipedidae) family. Individual specimens can reach a standard length of 10.8 centimetres (4.3 in).
