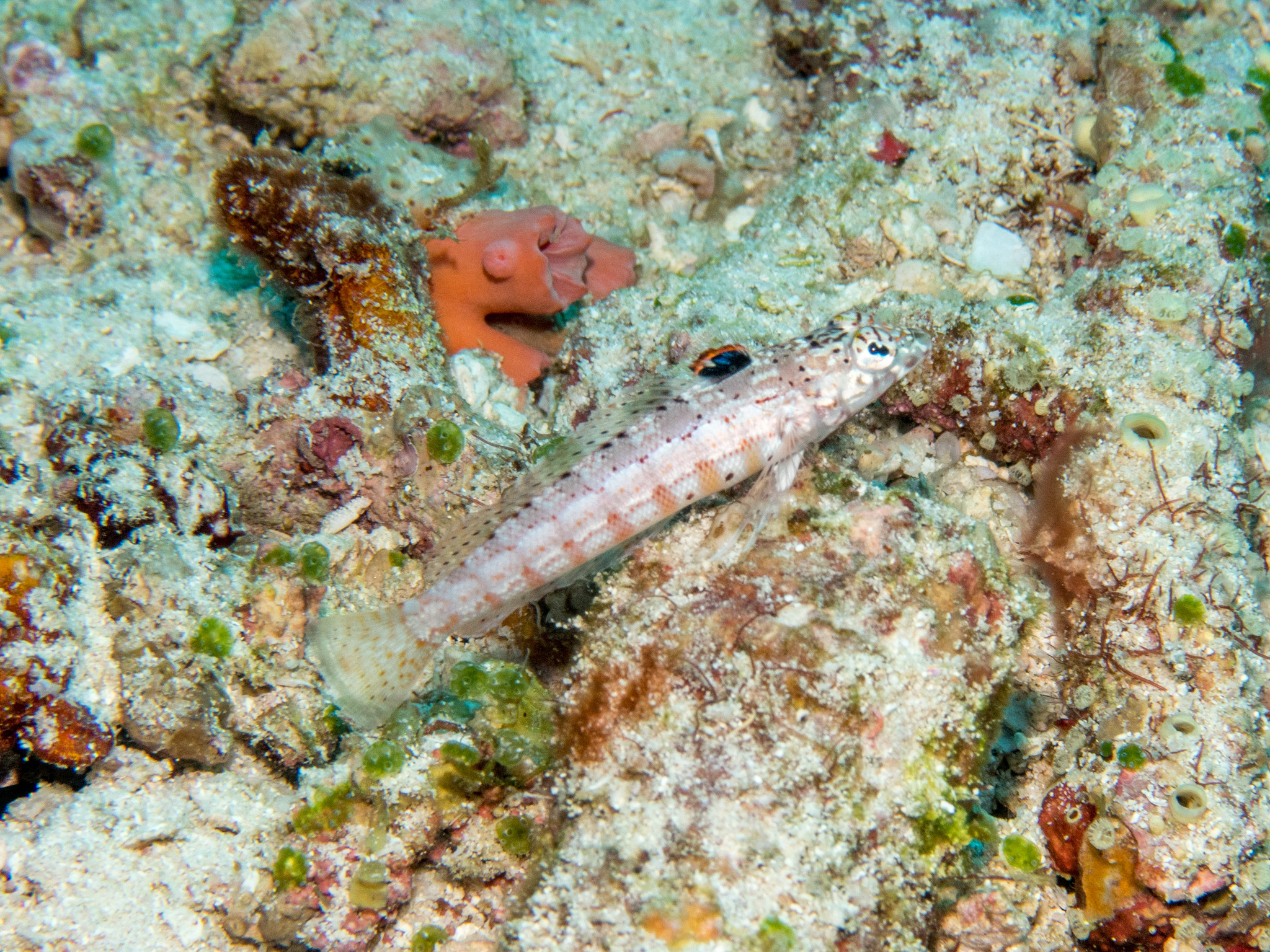

Conservation status
- Least Concern (IUCN 3.1)

Scientific classification
- Kingdom: Animalia
- Phylum: Chordata
- Class: Actinopterygii
- Order: Labriformes
- Family: Pinguipedidae
- Genus: Parapercis
- Species: P. signata

Binomial name
- Parapercis signata J. E. Randall, 1984

= Parapercis signata =

Species of ray-finned fish

Parapercis signata, the blackflag sandperch, is a ray-finned fish species in the sandperch family, Pinguipedidae. It is found in the Maldives. This species reaches a length of 13.0 cm (5.1 in).
