= Parapercis katoi =

Scientific classification
- Kingdom: Animalia
- Phylum: Chordata
- Class: Actinopterygii
- Order: Labriformes
- Family: Pinguipedidae
- Genus: Parapercis
- Species: P. katoi

Binomial name
- Parapercis katoi J. E. Randall, Senou & Yoshino, 2008

Species of ray-finned fish

Parapercis katoi is a ray-finned fish species in the sandperch family, Pinguipedidae. It is found in Japan. This species reaches a length of 17.7 cm (7.0 in).

== Etymology ==
The fish is named in honor of Kenji Kato, of the Tokyo Metropolitan Fisheries Experiment Station, who caught the holotype in 1991 with hook and line and provided color photographs of the live fish.
