= Parapercis flavescens =

Scientific classification
- Domain: Eukaryota
- Kingdom: Animalia
- Phylum: Chordata
- Class: Actinopterygii
- Order: Labriformes
- Family: Pinguipedidae
- Genus: Parapercis
- Species: P. flavescens

Binomial name
- Parapercis flavescens Fourmanoir & Rivaton, 1979

Species of ray-finned fish

Parapercis flavescens is a species of ray-finned fish in the sandperch family, Pinguipedidae. It is found in New Caledonia.

== Description ==
Parapercis flavescens can reach a total length of 8.9 centimetres (3.5 in).
