= Parapercis maritzi =

Scientific classification
- Kingdom: Animalia
- Phylum: Chordata
- Class: Actinopterygii
- Order: Labriformes
- Family: Pinguipedidae
- Genus: Parapercis
- Species: P. maritzi

Binomial name
- Parapercis maritzi M. E. Anderson, 1992

Species of ray-finned fish

Parapercis maritzi is a species of ray-finned fish in the sandperch family, Pinguipedidae. It is found in the Indian Ocean off South Africa.

== Description ==
Parapercis maritzi can reach a standard length of 11.4 centimetres (4.5 in).

== Discovery ==
During 14-20 June 1990, Mr Willie Maritz, Curator of the East London Aquarium in South Africa, was invited to participate in a hake reconnaissance cruise aboard the Spanish trawler Playa de Galicia off the Transkei coast. A commercial bottom trawl of 80-150m deep was done to catch hake.

Mr Maritz took fish for the aquarium and froze other unusual fish for otolith extraction at the Port Elizabeth Museum. Specimens used for the latter were sent to the J. L. B. Smith Institute of Ichthyology where it was determined that a new species had been identified.

== Etymology ==
Parapercis maritzi is named in honour of Willie Maritz, curator of the East London Aquarium in South Africa.
