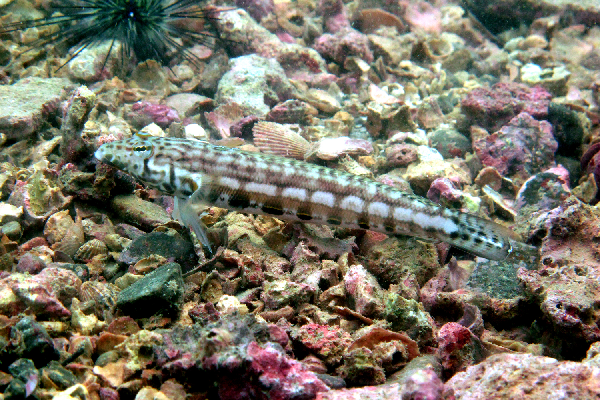

Scientific classification
- Kingdom: Animalia
- Phylum: Chordata
- Class: Actinopterygii
- Order: Labriformes
- Family: Pinguipedidae
- Genus: Parapercis
- Species: P. kamoharai

Binomial name
- Parapercis kamoharai L. P. Schultz, 1966

= Parapercis kamoharai =

Species of ray-finned fish

Parapercis kamoharai is a species of ray-finned fish in the sandperch family, Pinguipedidae. It is found in Japan, Taiwan and Hong Kong.

== Description ==
Parapercis kamoharai reaches a standard length of 20.0 cm (7.9 in).

== Etymology ==
The fish is named in honor of ichthyologist Toshiji Kamohara (1901-1972), of the Kochi University.
