= Parapercis fuscolineata =

Conservation status
- Least Concern (IUCN 3.1)

Scientific classification
- Kingdom: Animalia
- Phylum: Chordata
- Class: Actinopterygii
- Order: Labriformes
- Family: Pinguipedidae
- Genus: Parapercis
- Species: P. fuscolineata

Binomial name
- Parapercis fuscolineata Foumanoir, 1985

Species of ray-finned fish

Parapercis fuscolineata is a species of ray-finned fish in the sandperch family, Pinguipedidae. It is found in the Philippines.

== Description ==
Parapercis fuscolineata can reach a total length of 11.4 centimetres (4.5 in).
