= Parapercis nigrodorsalis =

Scientific classification
- Domain: Eukaryota
- Kingdom: Animalia
- Phylum: Chordata
- Class: Actinopterygii
- Order: Labriformes
- Family: Pinguipedidae
- Genus: Parapercis
- Species: P. nigrodorsalis

Binomial name
- Parapercis nigrodorsalis J. W. Johnson, Struthers & Worthington Wilmer, 2014

Species of ray-finned fish

Parapercis nigrodorsalis, the blackfin sandperch, is a species of ray-finned fish in the sandperch family, Pinguipedidae. It is found in New Zealand.

== Description ==
Parapercis nigrodorsalis can reach a standard length of 15.6 centimetres (6.1 in).
