= Parapercis sexlorata =

Scientific classification
- Domain: Eukaryota
- Kingdom: Animalia
- Phylum: Chordata
- Class: Actinopterygii
- Order: Labriformes
- Family: Pinguipedidae
- Genus: Parapercis
- Species: P. sexlorata

Binomial name
- Parapercis sexlorata J. W. Johnson, 2013

Species of ray-finned fish

Parapercis sexlorata, the sixstrap grubfish, is a species of ray-finned fish in the sandperch family, Pinguipedidae. It is found in the western Pacific Ocean off Australia.

Parapercis sexlorata can reach a standard length of 12.0 centimetres (4.7 in).
