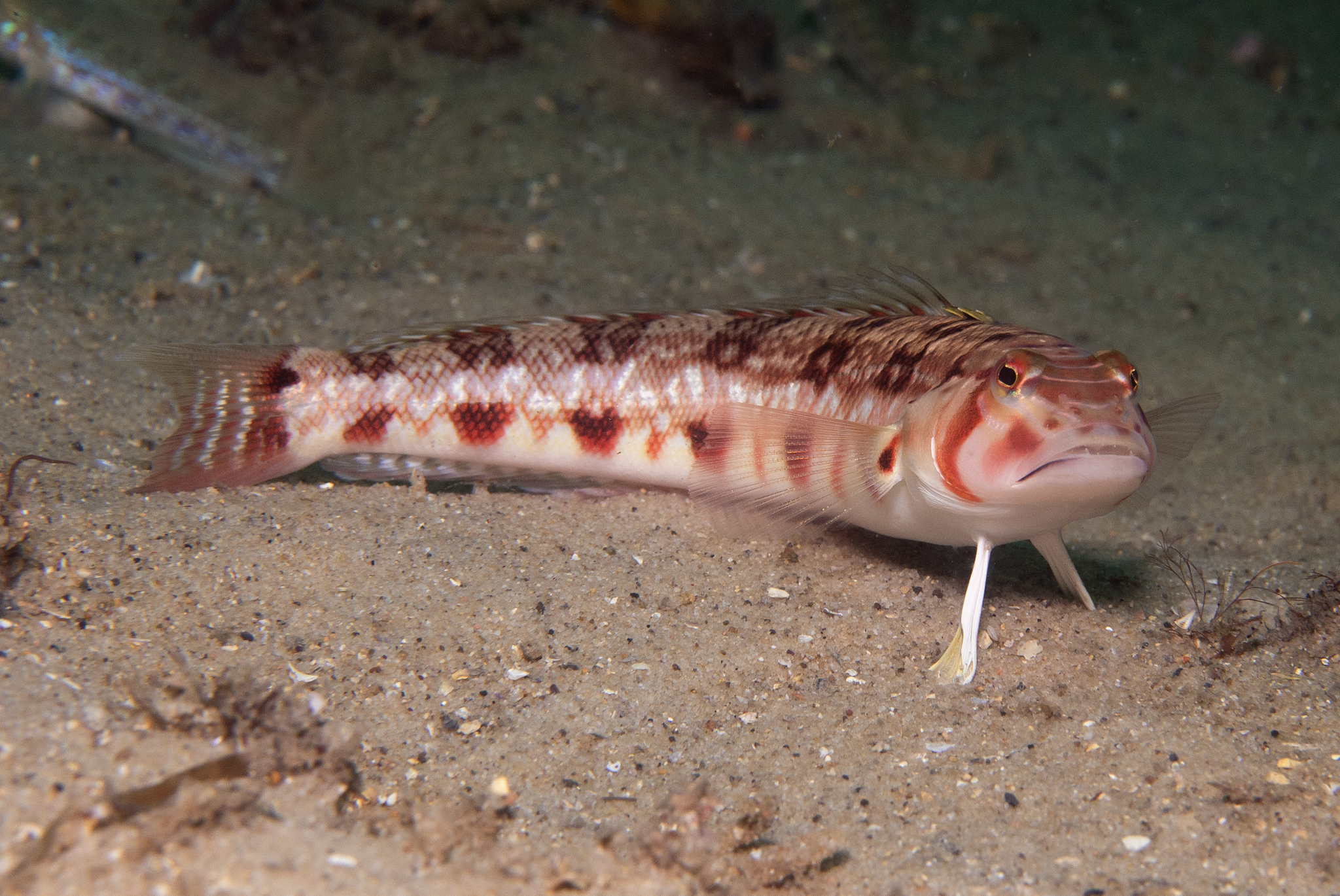

Conservation status
- Least Concern (IUCN 3.1)

Scientific classification
- Kingdom: Animalia
- Phylum: Chordata
- Class: Actinopterygii
- Order: Labriformes
- Family: Pinguipedidae
- Genus: Parapercis
- Species: P. nebulosa

Binomial name
- Parapercis nebulosa (Quoy & Gaimard, 1825)

= Parapercis nebulosa =

Species of ray-finned fish

Parapercis nebulosa, the barred sandperch, is a species of ray-finned fish in the sandperch family, Pinguipedidae. It is found off the coast of Australia.

== Description ==
Parapercis nebulosa can reach a total length of 25.0 centimetres (9.8 in).
