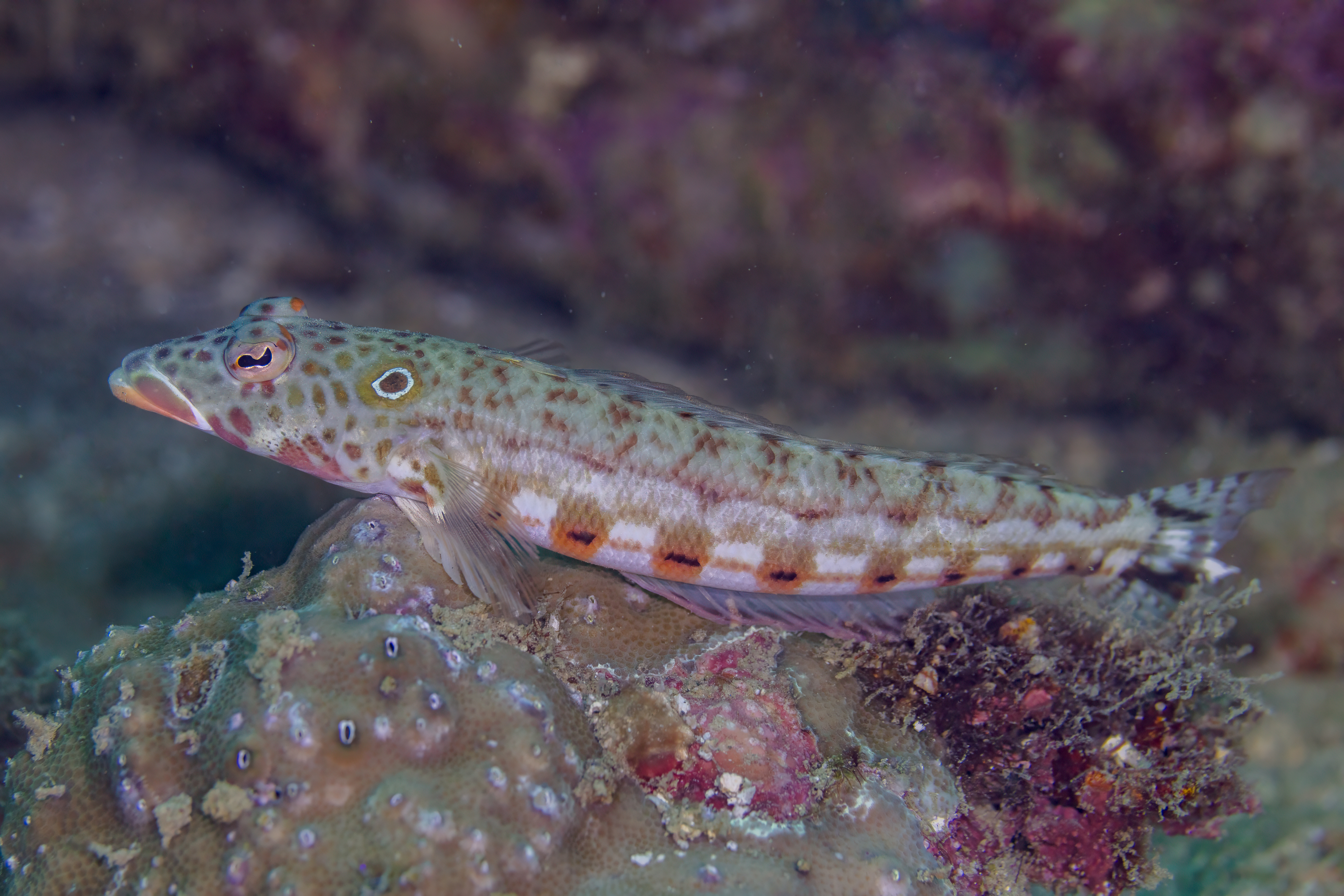

Conservation status
- Least Concern (IUCN 3.1)

Scientific classification
- Kingdom: Animalia
- Phylum: Chordata
- Class: Actinopterygii
- Order: Labriformes
- Family: Pinguipedidae
- Genus: Parapercis
- Species: P. clathrata

Binomial name
- Parapercis clathrata W. Ogilby, 1910

= Parapercis clathrata =

Species of ray-finned fish

Parapercis clathrata, the latticed sandperch, is a species of ray-finned fish in the sandperch family, Pinguipedidae. It is found throughout the Indo-West Pacific Ocean from India and Sri Lanka to Tonga.

== Description ==
Parapercis clathrata reaches a total length of 24.0 cm (9.4 in).
