= Parapercis atlantica =

Conservation status
- Data Deficient (IUCN 3.1)

Scientific classification
- Kingdom: Animalia
- Phylum: Chordata
- Class: Actinopterygii
- Order: Labriformes
- Family: Pinguipedidae
- Genus: Parapercis
- Species: P. atlantica

Binomial name
- Parapercis atlantica (Vaillant, 1887)

Synonyms
- Neopercis atlantica Vaillant, 1887; Neopercis ledanoisi Cadenat, 1937

Species of ray-finned fish

Parapercis atlantica is a ray-finned fish species in the sandperch family, Pinguipedidae. It is found in Cape Verde. This species reaches a length of 14.3 cm (5.6 in).
