= Parapercis banoni =

Scientific classification
- Kingdom: Animalia
- Phylum: Chordata
- Class: Actinopterygii
- Order: Labriformes
- Family: Pinguipedidae
- Genus: Parapercis
- Species: P. banoni

Binomial name
- Parapercis banoni J. E. Randall & Yamakawa, 2006

Species of ray-finned fish

Parapercis banoni is a ray-finned fish species in the sandperch family, Pinguipedidae. It is found in the Southeastern Atlantic at a place called the Valdivia Bank. This species reaches a length of 19.2 cm (7.6 in).

== Etymology ==
The fish is named in honor of fisheries ecologist Rafael Bañón Diaz (b. 1961), who first reported the species in 2000 and provided specimens and color photographs of the fish.
