= Parapercis lata =

Scientific classification
- Domain: Eukaryota
- Kingdom: Animalia
- Phylum: Chordata
- Class: Actinopterygii
- Order: Labriformes
- Family: Pinguipedidae
- Genus: Parapercis
- Species: P. lata

Binomial name
- Parapercis lata J. E. Randall & J. E. McCosker, 2002

Species of ray-finned fish

Parapercis lata, the y-barred sandperch, is a ray-finned fish species in the sandperch family, Pinguipedidae. It is found in the Eastern Central Pacific, Kiribati among other locations. This species reaches a length of 21.2 cm (8.3 in).
