= Parapercis biordinis =

Scientific classification
- Domain: Eukaryota
- Kingdom: Animalia
- Phylum: Chordata
- Class: Actinopterygii
- Order: Labriformes
- Family: Pinguipedidae
- Genus: Parapercis
- Species: P. biordinis

Binomial name
- Parapercis biordinis G. R. Allen, 1976

Species of ray-finned fish

Parapercis biordinis is a ray-finned fish species in the sandperch family, Pinguipedidae. It is found in Western Australia and the Philippines.
