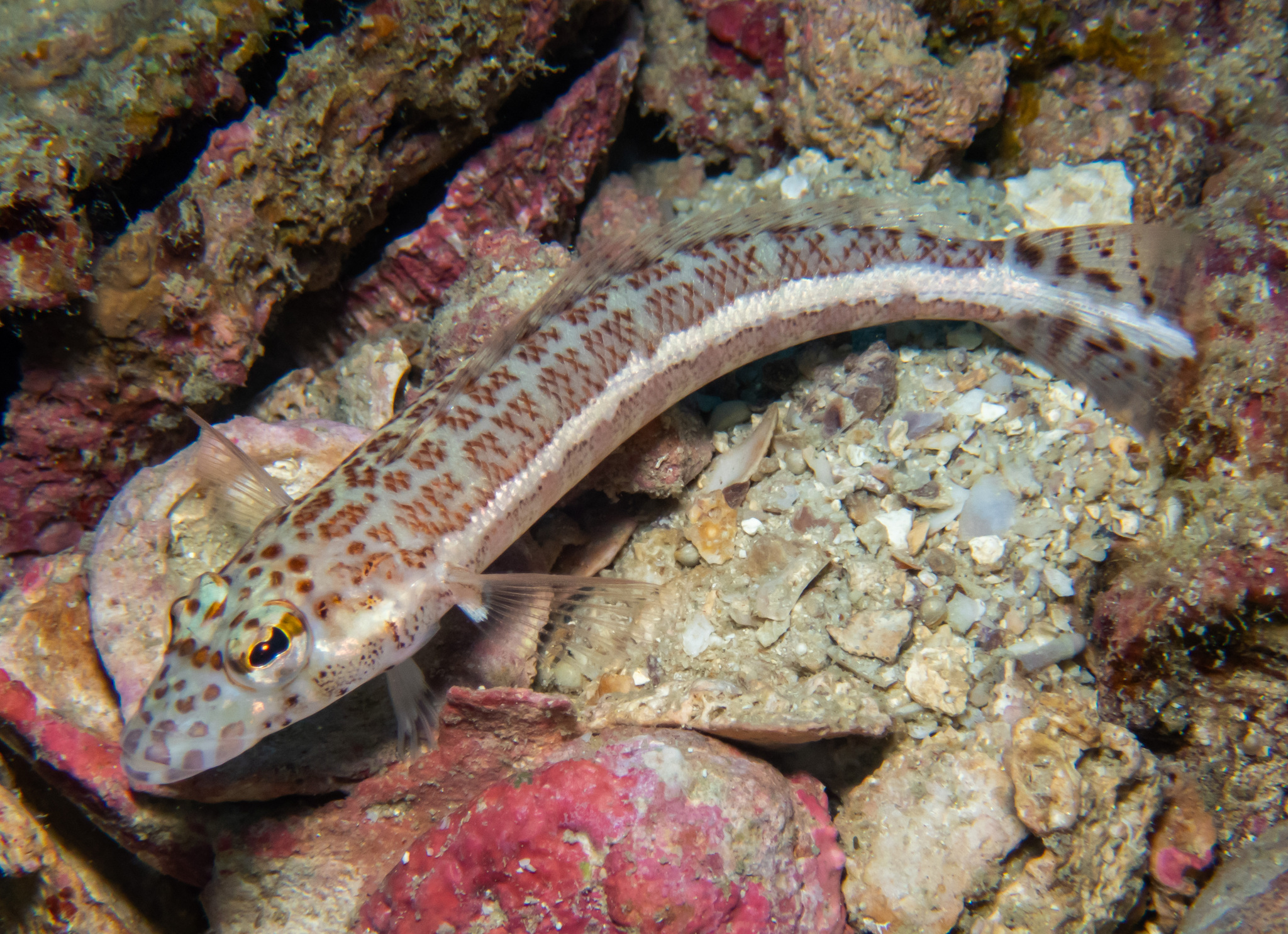

Conservation status
- Least Concern (IUCN 3.1)

Scientific classification
- Kingdom: Animalia
- Phylum: Chordata
- Class: Actinopterygii
- Order: Labriformes
- Family: Pinguipedidae
- Genus: Parapercis
- Species: P. xanthozona

Binomial name
- Parapercis xanthozona (Bleeker, 1849)

Synonyms
- Percis xanthozona Bleeker, 1849; Neopercis xanthozona (Bleeker, 1849); Parapercis xanthosoma (Bleeker, 1849)

= Parapercis xanthozona =

Species of ray-finned fish

Parapercis xanthozona, the yellowbar sandperch, is a species of ray-finned fish in the sandperch family, Pinguipedidae. It is found in the Indo-West Pacific Ocean from East Africa to Fiji.

== Description ==
Parapercis xanthozona reaches a total length of 23.0 cm (9.1 in).
