= Parapercis australis =

Scientific classification
- Kingdom: Animalia
- Phylum: Chordata
- Class: Actinopterygii
- Division: Teleostei
- Order: Labriformes
- Family: Pinguipedidae
- Genus: Parapercis
- Species: P. australis

Binomial name
- Parapercis australis J. E. Randall, 2003

Species of ray-finned fish

Parapercis australis is a ray-finned fish species in the sandperch family, Pinguipedidae. It is found in Queensland, Australia and the island of Tonga. This species reaches a length of 9.2 cm (3.6 in).
