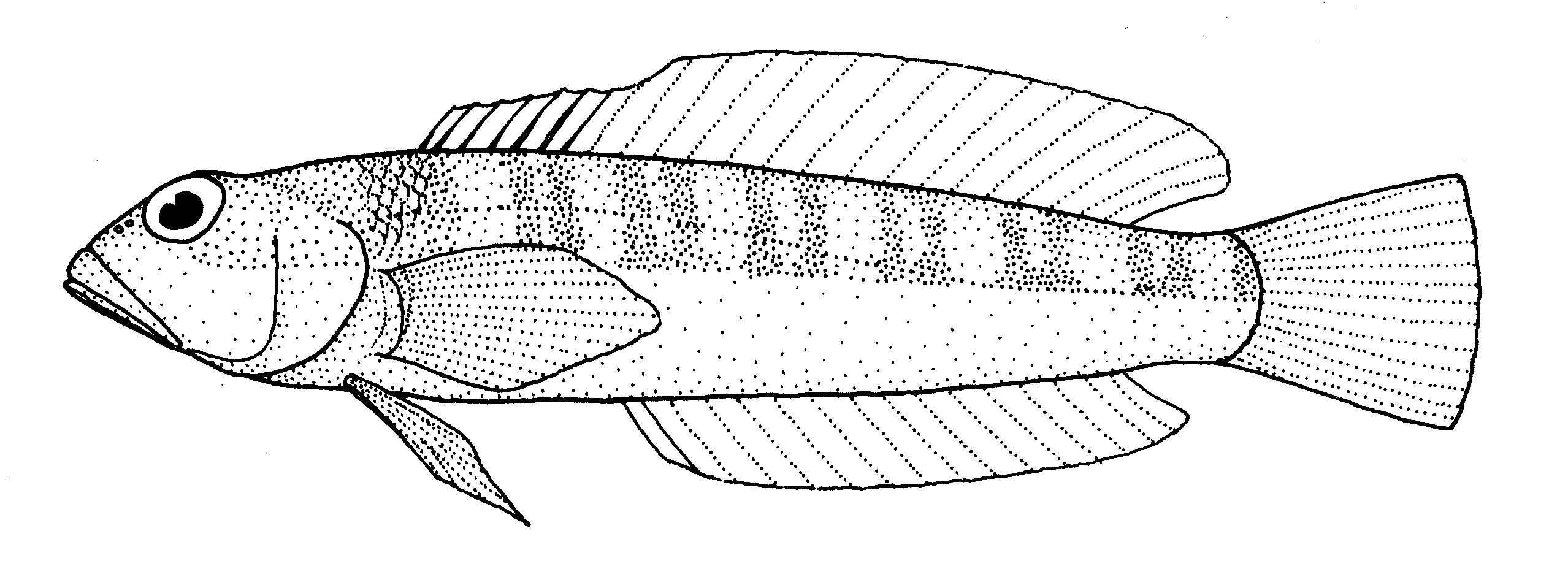
- Drawing by Dr Tony Ayling

Scientific classification
- Kingdom: Animalia
- Phylum: Chordata
- Class: Actinopterygii
- Order: Labriformes
- Family: Pinguipedidae
- Genus: Parapercis
- Species: P. binivirgata

Binomial name
- Parapercis binivirgata (Waite, 1904)

Synonyms
- Neopercis binivirgata Waite, 1904

= Redbanded weever =

Species of ray-finned fish

The redbanded weever (Parapercis binivirgata) is a sandperch of the family Pinguipedidae found around Australia and New Zealand at depths between 50 and 440 metres (160 and 1,440 ft). Its length is up to 20 centimetres (7.9 in).
