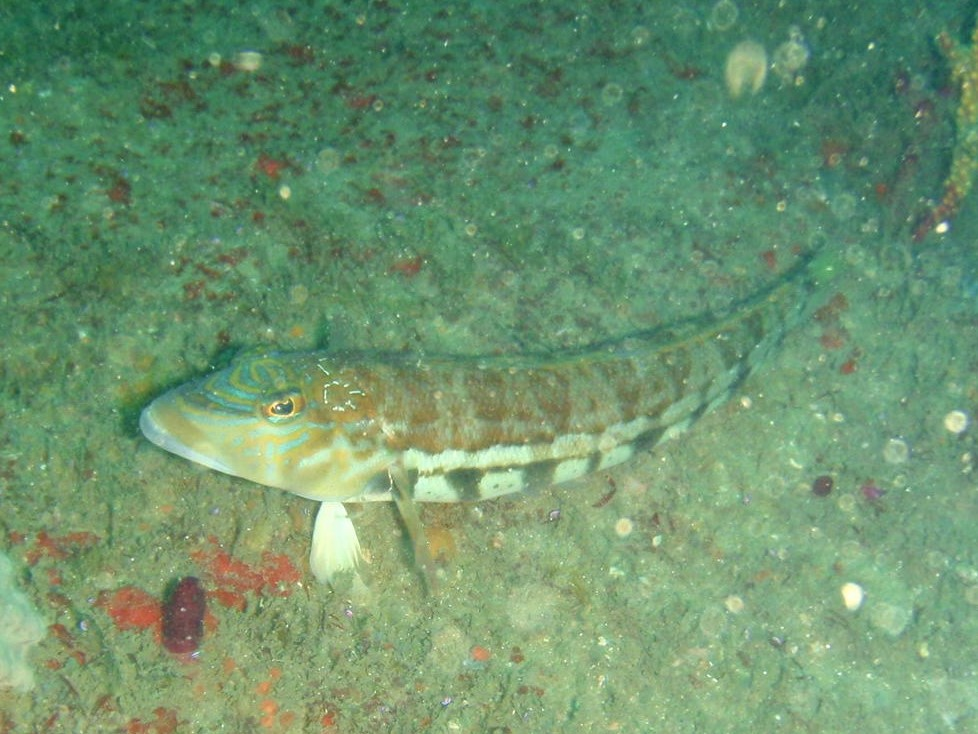

Scientific classification
- Kingdom: Animalia
- Phylum: Chordata
- Class: Actinopterygii
- Order: Labriformes
- Family: Pinguipedidae
- Genus: Parapercis
- Species: P. robinsoni

Binomial name
- Parapercis robinsoni Fowler, 1929

= Parapercis robinsoni =

Species of ray-finned fish

Parapercis robinsoni, the smallscale grubfish, is a species of ray-finned fish in the sandperch family, Pinguipedidae. It is found in the western Indian Ocean, from the Red Sea to South Africa and north to Pakistan.

== Description ==
Parapercis robinsoni can reach a total length of 30.0 centimetres (11.8 in).

== Etymology ==
The fish is named in honour of John Benjamin Romer Robinson (1869–1949), a South African attorney and businessman.
