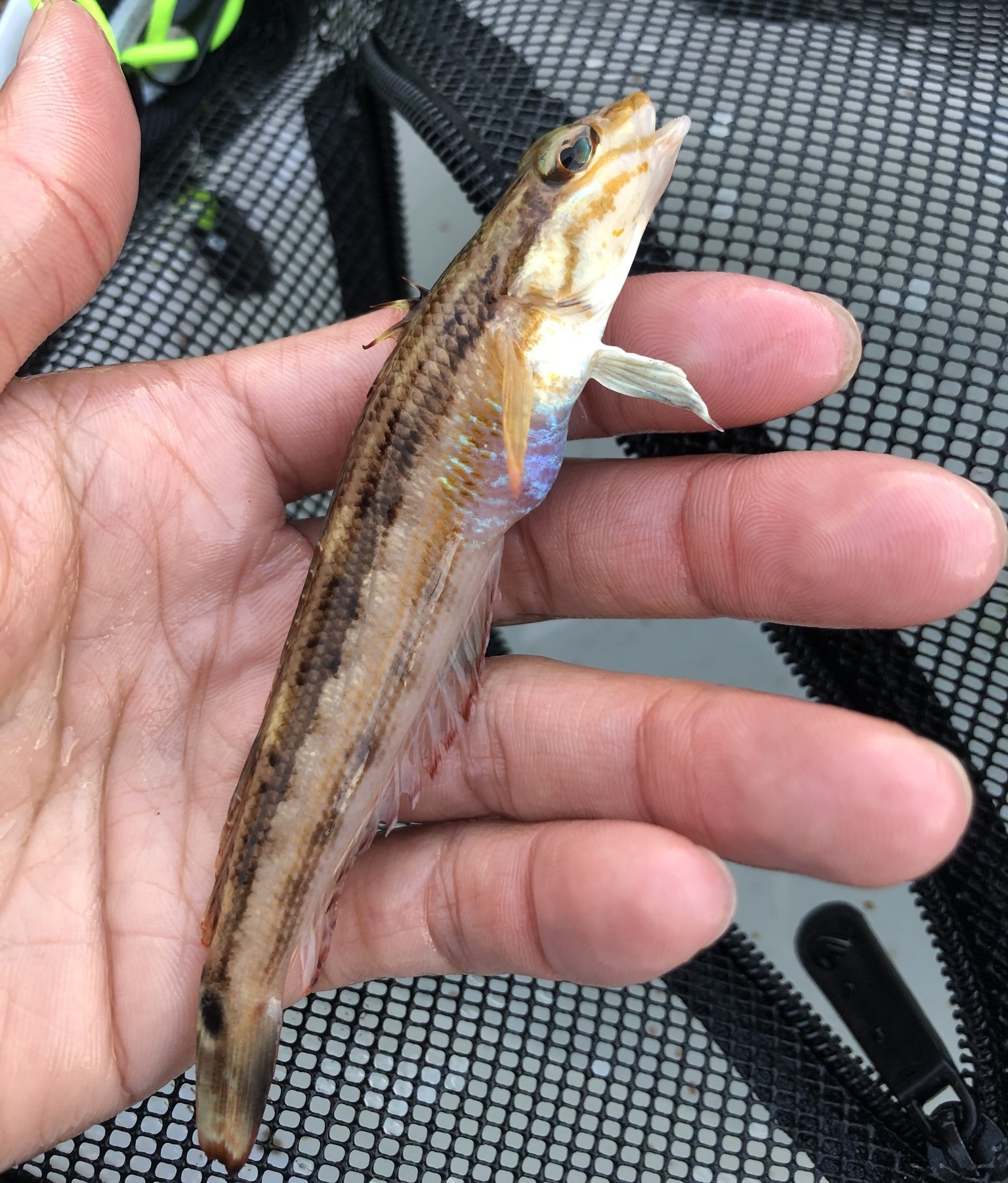

Scientific classification
- Domain: Eukaryota
- Kingdom: Animalia
- Phylum: Chordata
- Class: Actinopterygii
- Order: Labriformes
- Family: Pinguipedidae
- Genus: Parapercis
- Species: P. ommatura

Binomial name
- Parapercis ommatura D. S. Jordan & Snyder, 1902

= Parapercis ommatura =

Species of ray-finned fish

Parapercis ommatura is a species of ray-finned fish in the sandperch family, Pinguipedidae. It is found from southern Japan to China.

== Description ==
Parapercis ommatura can reach a standard length of 11.0 centimetres (4.3 in).
