= Parapercis aurantiaca =

Scientific classification
- Domain: Eukaryota
- Kingdom: Animalia
- Phylum: Chordata
- Class: Actinopterygii
- Order: Labriformes
- Family: Pinguipedidae
- Genus: Parapercis
- Species: P. aurantiaca

Binomial name
- Parapercis aurantiaca Döderlein, 1884

Species of ray-finned fish

Parapercis aurantiaca is a ray-finned fish species in the sandperch family, Pinguipedidae. It is found in the Northwest Pacific, including China, Japan, Taiwan and South Korea. This species reaches a length of 17.0 cm (6.7 in).
