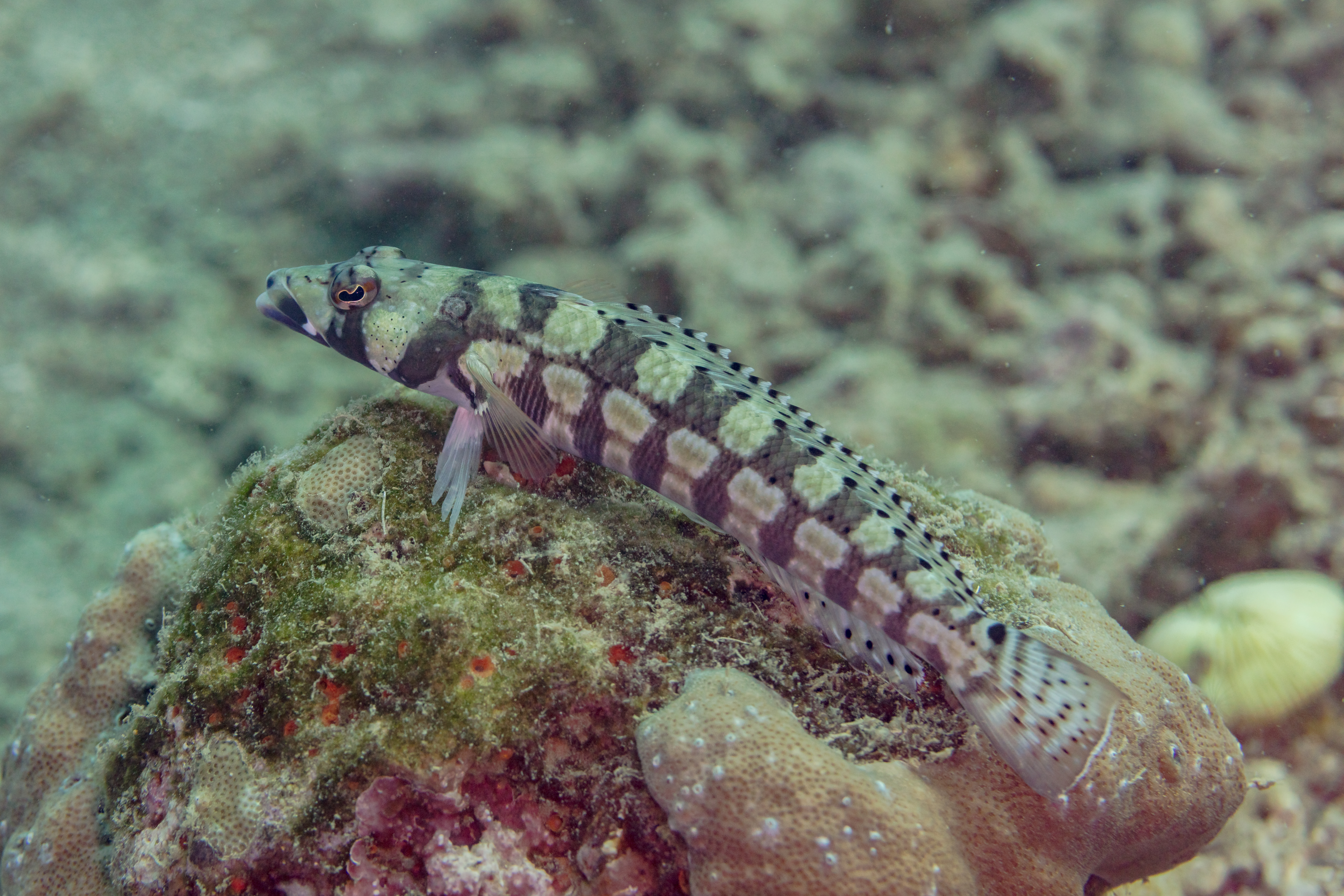

Conservation status
- Least Concern (IUCN 3.1)

Scientific classification
- Kingdom: Animalia
- Phylum: Chordata
- Class: Actinopterygii
- Division: Teleostei
- Order: Labriformes
- Family: Pinguipedidae
- Genus: Parapercis
- Species: P. tetracantha

Binomial name
- Parapercis tetracantha (Lacépède, 1802)

Synonyms
- Labrus tetracanthus Lacepède, 1801; Percis cancellata Cuvier, 1816; Parapercis cancellata (Cuvier, 1816)

= Parapercis tetracantha =

Species of ray-finned fish

Parapercis tetracantha, the reticulated sandperch, is a species of ray-finned fish in the sandperch family, Pinguipedidae. It is found in the Bay of Bengal to seas around Japan and Indonesia throughout the Indo-West Pacific region.

== Description ==
Parapercis tetracantha can reach a total length of 26.0 centimetres (10.2 in).
