= Parapercis bicoloripes =

Scientific classification
- Domain: Eukaryota
- Kingdom: Animalia
- Phylum: Chordata
- Class: Actinopterygii
- Order: Labriformes
- Family: Pinguipedidae
- Genus: Parapercis
- Species: P. bicoloripes

Binomial name
- Parapercis bicoloripes Prokofiev, 2010

Species of ray-finned fish

Parapercis bicoloripes is a ray-finned fish species in the sandperch family, Pinguipedidae. It is found in Vietnam. This species reaches a length of 15.5 cm (6.1 in).
