= Parapercis moki =

Scientific classification
- Kingdom: Animalia
- Phylum: Chordata
- Class: Actinopterygii
- Order: Labriformes
- Family: Pinguipedidae
- Genus: Parapercis
- Species: P. moki

Binomial name
- Parapercis moki H. C. Ho & J. W. Johnson, 2013

Species of ray-finned fish

Parapercis moki, also known as Mok's sandperch, is a species of ray-finned fish in the sandperch family, Pinguipedidae. It is found in the north-western Pacific Ocean off Taiwan.

== Description ==
Parapercis moki can reach a standard length of 10.4 centimetres (4.1 in).

== Etymology ==
The fish is named in honor of ichthyologist Hin-Kiu Mok (b. 1947) of the National Sun Ye-San University in Taiwan.
