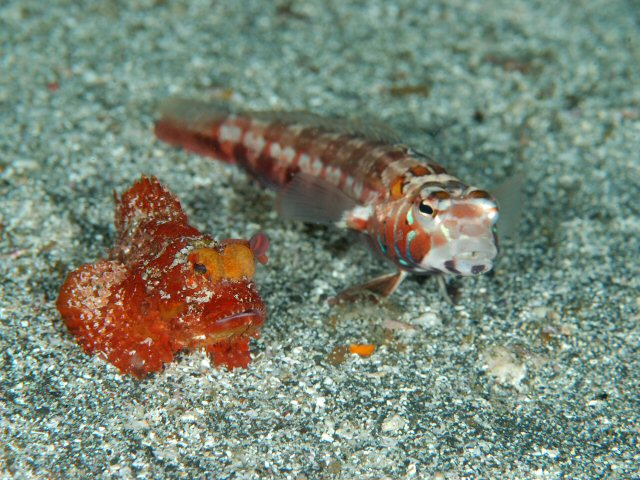

Conservation status
- Least Concern (IUCN 3.1)

Scientific classification
- Kingdom: Animalia
- Phylum: Chordata
- Class: Actinopterygii
- Order: Labriformes
- Family: Pinguipedidae
- Genus: Parapercis
- Species: P. pulchella

Binomial name
- Parapercis pulchella (Temminck & Schlegel, 1843)

Synonyms
- Percis pulchella Temminck & Schlegel, 1843

= Parapercis pulchella =

Species of ray-finned fish

Parapercis pulchella, the harlequin sandsmelt, is a ray-finned fish species in the sandperch family, Pinguipedidae. It is found in the north-western Pacific Ocean, including the shores of Japan, Taiwan and Hong Kong.

== Description ==
Parapercis pulchella reaches a total length of 20.0 cm (7.9 in).
