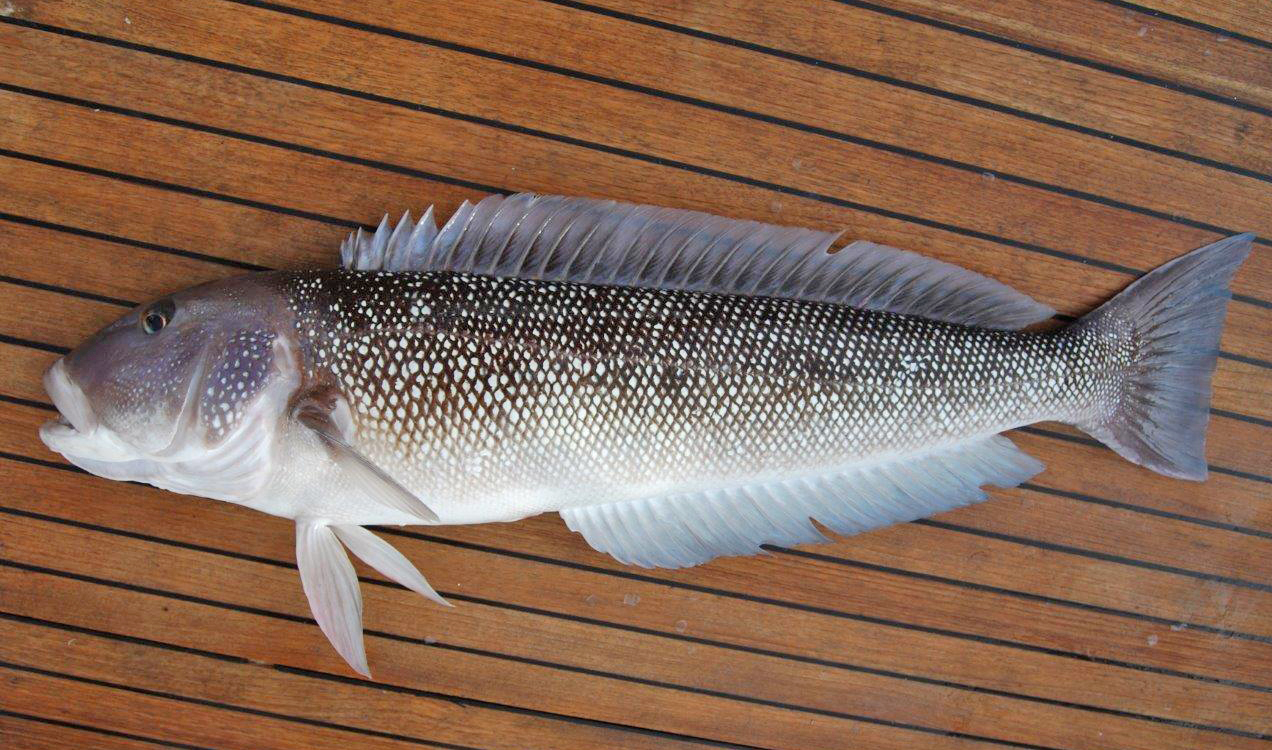
- Pseudopercis numida
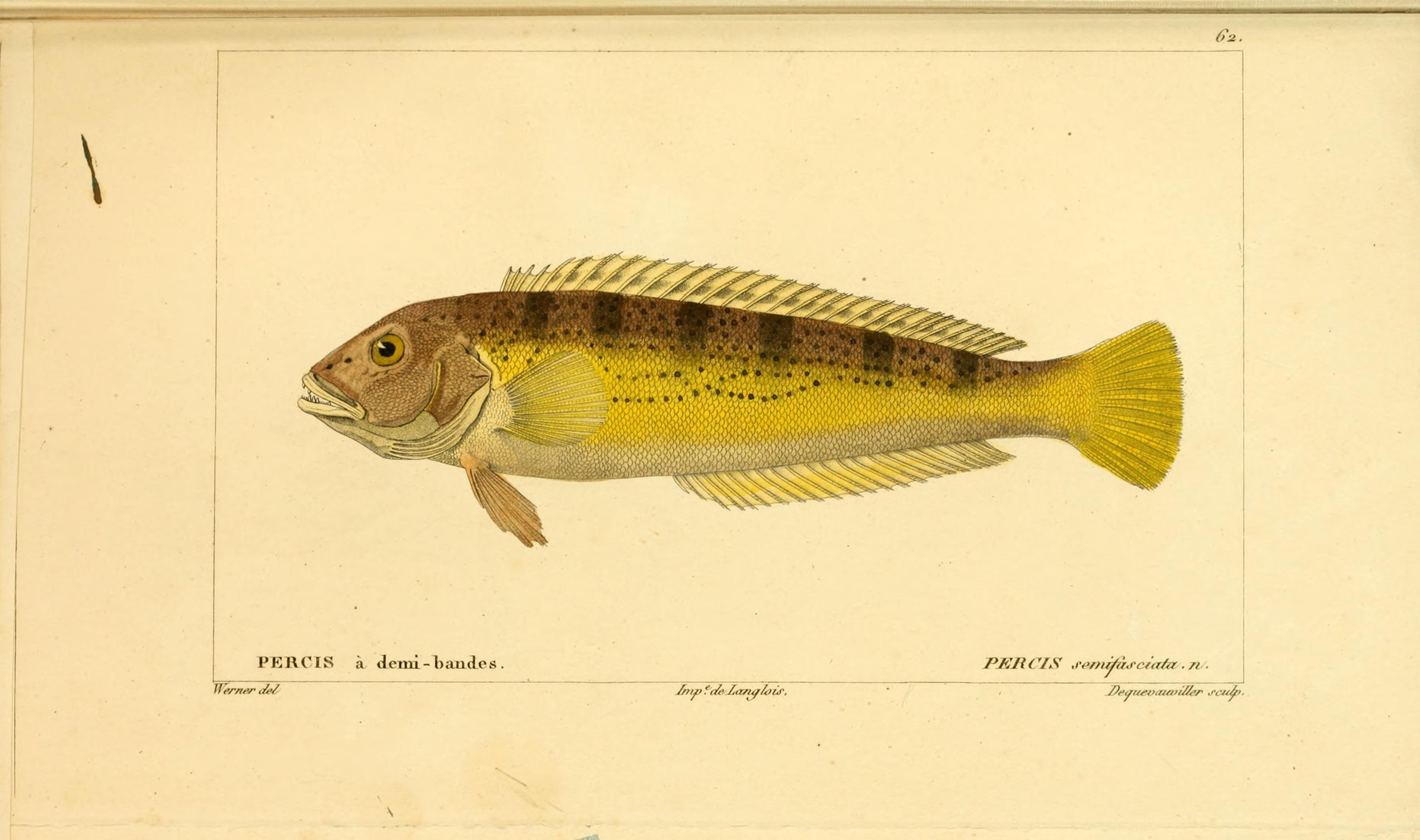
- Pseudopercis semifasciata

Scientific classification
- Kingdom: Animalia
- Phylum: Chordata
- Class: Actinopterygii
- Order: Labriformes
- Family: Pinguipedidae
- Genus: Pseudopercis; Miranda-Ribeiro, 1903

Type species
- Pseudopercis numida Miranda Ribeiro, 1903

= Pseudopercis =

Genus of ray-finned fishes

Pseudopercis is a genus of ray-finned fish which are part of the family Pinguipedidae, the sandperches. They are from the coastal waters of South America and are distinguished from other Neotropical sandperches in their more robust heads and bodies.

== Species ==
There are two recognised species in the genus Pseudopercis:

- Pseudopercis numida Miranda Ribeiro, 1903 - Namorado sandperch
- Pseudopercis semifasciata (Cuvier, 1829) - Argentinian sandperch
