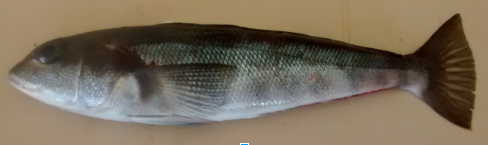

Scientific classification
- Kingdom: Animalia
- Phylum: Chordata
- Class: Actinopterygii
- Order: Labriformes
- Family: Pinguipedidae
- Genus: Prolatilus; Gill, 1865
- Species: P. jugularis

Binomial name
- Prolatilus jugularis Valenciennes, 1833

Synonyms
- Latilus jugularis Valenciennes, 1833; Parapercis chilensis Norman, 1937; Porteridia chilensis (Norman, 1937)

= Prolatilus =

Genus of ray-finned fishes

Prolatilus is a monotypic genus of labriform ray-finned fish from the family Pinguipedidae. The only species in the genus, Prolatilus jugularis, the Pacific sandperch, is found in the south eastern Pacific of the coast of Peru and Chile. It occurs over rocky and sandy bottoms and feeds on crustaceans, polychaetes and small fish. This species is considered to be good quality food fish and is commercially exploited.
