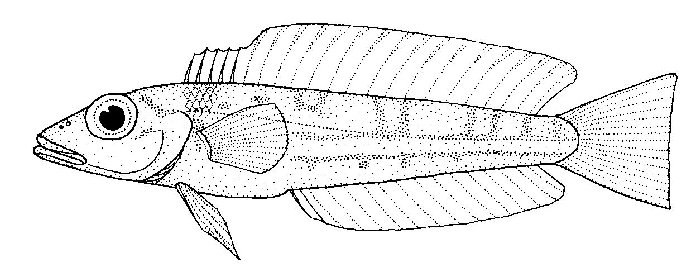
- Drawing by Dr Tony Ayling

Scientific classification
- Kingdom: Animalia
- Phylum: Chordata
- Class: Actinopterygii
- Division: Teleostei
- Order: Labriformes
- Family: Pinguipedidae
- Genus: Parapercis
- Species: P. gilliesii

Binomial name
- Parapercis gilliesii (Hutton, 1879)

Synonyms
- Percis gilliesii Hutton, 1879

= Yellow weaver (fish) =

Sandperch; a marine fish in the genus Parapercis from New Zealand

The yellow weaver, Parapercis gilliesii, is a sandperch, a species of marine ray-finned fish in the genus Parapercis found only around New Zealand. It was first described in 1879. It grows up to 25cm.
