= Ryukyupercis =

Scientific classification
- Kingdom: Animalia
- Phylum: Chordata
- Class: Actinopterygii
- Order: Labriformes
- Family: Pinguipedidae
- Genus: Ryukyupercis; Imamura & Yoshino, 2007
- Species: R. gushikeni

Binomial name
- Ryukyupercis gushikeni (Yoshino, 1975)

Synonyms
- Parapercis gushikeni Yoshino, 1975

Genus of ray-finned fishes

Ryukyupercis is a monotypic genus of percomorph fish from the family Pinguipedidae, the sandperches. The only species in the genus, Ryukyupercis gushikeni, the rosy grubfish, is found in the Indo-Pacific from Japan to north western Australia. The generic name is a compound of Ryukyu after the Ryukyu Islands where the type specimen was collected and "percis" a suffix for many of the genera in the Pinguipediae, the specific name honours Mr Soko Gushiken, a who gave the describer of the species, Tetsuo Yoshino, many specimens.
