= Kwang-Tsao Shao =

Taiwanese ichthyologist

Shao Kwang-tsao
- 邵廣昭
- Born: 17 May 1951 (age 75); Keelung, Taiwan Province, Republic of China
- Education: National Taiwan University – Department of Zoology, Division of Fisheries Biology; National Taiwan University – Institute of Oceanography (M.Sc.); Stony Brook University – Ph.D. in Ecology and Evolution
- Known for: Research on fish biodiversity in Taiwan; Project director of the Fish Database of Taiwan
- Scientific career
- Fields: Ichthyology
- Workplaces: Academia Sinica, Institute of Zoology – Deputy Director and Director; National Taiwan Ocean University, Institute of Marine Biology – Director; Biodiversity Research Center, Academia Sinica – Executive Director

Shao Kwang-tsao (Chinese: 邵廣昭; born May 17, 1951) is a Taiwanese ichthyologist from Keelung. He is currently the Executive Director of the Biodiversity Research Center, Academia Sinica.

== Biography ==
Shao was born in Keelung, Taiwan, in 1951. His ancestral home is in Wuxi, Jiangsu. He received his bachelor’s degree in Fisheries Biology from the Department of Zoology, National Taiwan University (the department has since merged into the Department of Life Science, and the graduate section became the Institute of Zoology). He then pursued a master’s degree in the Institute of Oceanography at NTU under Chang Kun-hsiung, conducting marine diving research, and obtained his M.Sc. in 1976. Shao later attended the Department of Ecology and Evolution at Stony Brook University in the United States, earning his Ph.D. in 1983.

After completing his Ph.D., he returned to Taiwan and joined the Institute of Zoology, Academia Sinica (now the Institute of Cellular and Organismic Biology, Academia Sinica). He served successively as deputy director and director of the institute, as well as director of the Institute of Marine Biology at the National Taiwan Ocean University. He is currently the Executive Director of the Biodiversity Research Center, Academia Sinica.

== Research ==
Shao’s research mainly focuses on the biodiversity of fishes in Taiwan, emphasizing biological systematics, marine ecology, fish taxonomy, fish ecology, and evolutionary biology. He is the principal investigator of the Fish Database of Taiwan project.

== Controversy ==
During his tenure as Executive Director of the Biodiversity Research Center at Academia Sinica, Shao was accused of falsifying employment records to increase the salary of an assistant surnamed Tsai. He allegedly listed Tsai’s mother as a “temporary worker” in official reports and diverted approximately NT$7,000 per month to supplement Tsai’s pay. Shao, Tsai, and Tsai’s mother were all indicted by prosecutors for document forgery.

== Publications ==
- Blue Movement: Rediscovering Taiwan’s Marine Life, Shao Kwang-tsao, Lien Ching Publishing, December 13, 2000. ISBN 9789570821628
- Introduction to Fishes, Shao Kwang-tsao, Chen Li-shu, Huang Kun-mou, and Lai Pai-hsien, Yuan-Liou Publishing, April 1, 2004. ISBN 9789573251767
- Illustrated Fish Book: Over 700 Common Fishes of Taiwan, Shao Kwang-tsao and Chen Ching-yi, Yuan-Liou Publishing, November 20, 2005. ISBN 9789573251064
- Taiwan’s Dragon Palace: Exploring the Wonders of Marine Life, Shao Kwang-tsao and Chen Li-shu, Yuan-Liou Publishing, May 26, 2010. ISBN 9789573266075
- Red Data Book of Freshwater Fishes of Taiwan, Chen Yi-hsiung, Tseng Ching-hsien, and Shao Kwang-tsao, Forestry Bureau, Council of Agriculture, 2012. ISBN 9789860330748

He has also published several hundred academic papers in both Chinese and English journals.

== Awards and honors ==
- 1991 – 29th Ten Outstanding Young Persons Award, Republic of China (Taiwan).
- 2005 – Hou Jin-dui Outstanding Research Award.
