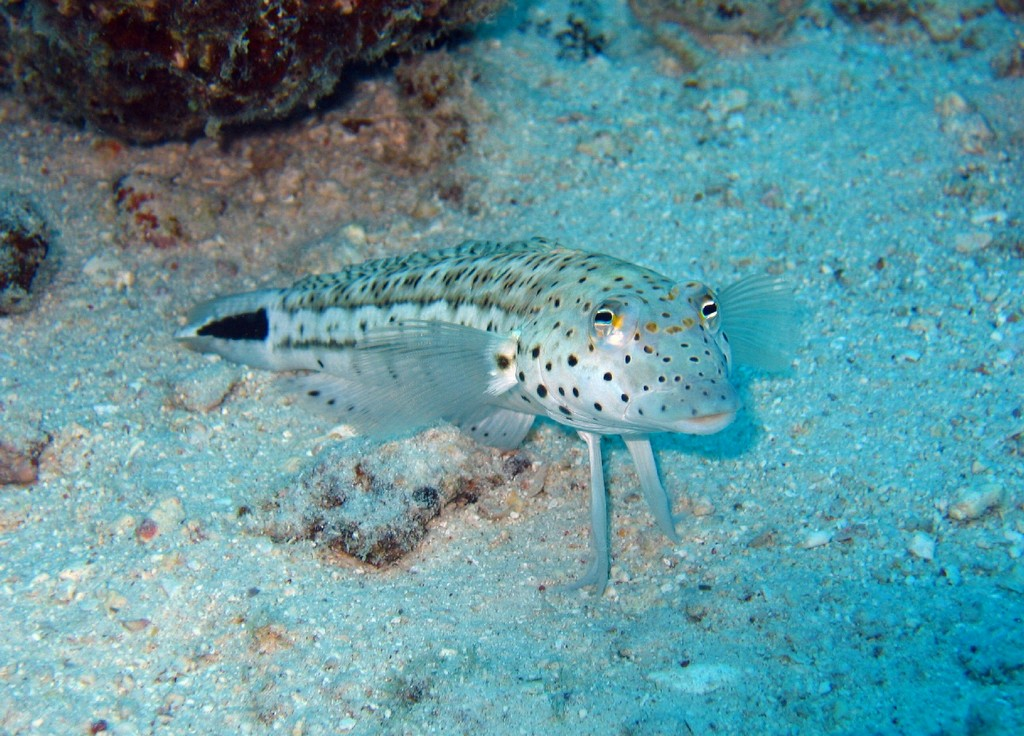
- Speckled sandperch, Parapercis hexophtalma

Scientific classification
- Kingdom: Animalia
- Phylum: Chordata
- Class: Actinopterygii
- Order: Labriformes
- Suborder: Uranoscopoidei
- Family: Pinguipedidae; Günther, 1860

Genera
- See text

Synonyms
- Parapercidae

= Sandperch =

Sandperches

Family of ray-finned fishes

The sandperches are a family, Pinguipedidae, of ray-finned fishes in the percomorph order Labriformes. Sandperches are benthic fish which normally occur over sand or rubble substrates in shallow seas. They are found off the coasts of South America, South Africa and in the Indo-Pacific as far east as Japan. There are 65 species, a few of which are used by humans for food.

== Characteristics ==
Some sandperches resemble wrasse in that they possess long dorsal and anal fins which may have a few spines and enlarged lips that appear to curl back with big canine teeth in the front of the jaws. They have elongated bodies which are flattened posteriorly and cylindrical towards the head. The body usually patterned with spots and bands, The eyes are positioned near top of head. They are relatively small in size, normally 60–90 centimetres (24–35 in) in length. These fish tend to sit on the sea bed, their bodies propped up by the widely separated pelvic fins. Some of the members of the speciose genus Parapercis, maybe all of them, are sequential hermaphrodites, all being female at sexual maturity and later changing into males which frequently have significantly different colourings and markings.

== Genera ==
The family Pinguipedidae contains seven genera with a total of 65 species. The genera are:

- Kochichthys Kamohara, 1961
- Parapercis Bleeker, 1863
- Pinguipes Cuvier in Cuvier and Valenciennes, 1829
- Prolatilus Gill, 1865
- Pseudopercis Miranda Ribeiro, 1903
- Ryukyupercis Imamura & Yoshino, 2007
- Simipercis Johnson & Randall 2006
