= Marsh harrier =

Group of birds

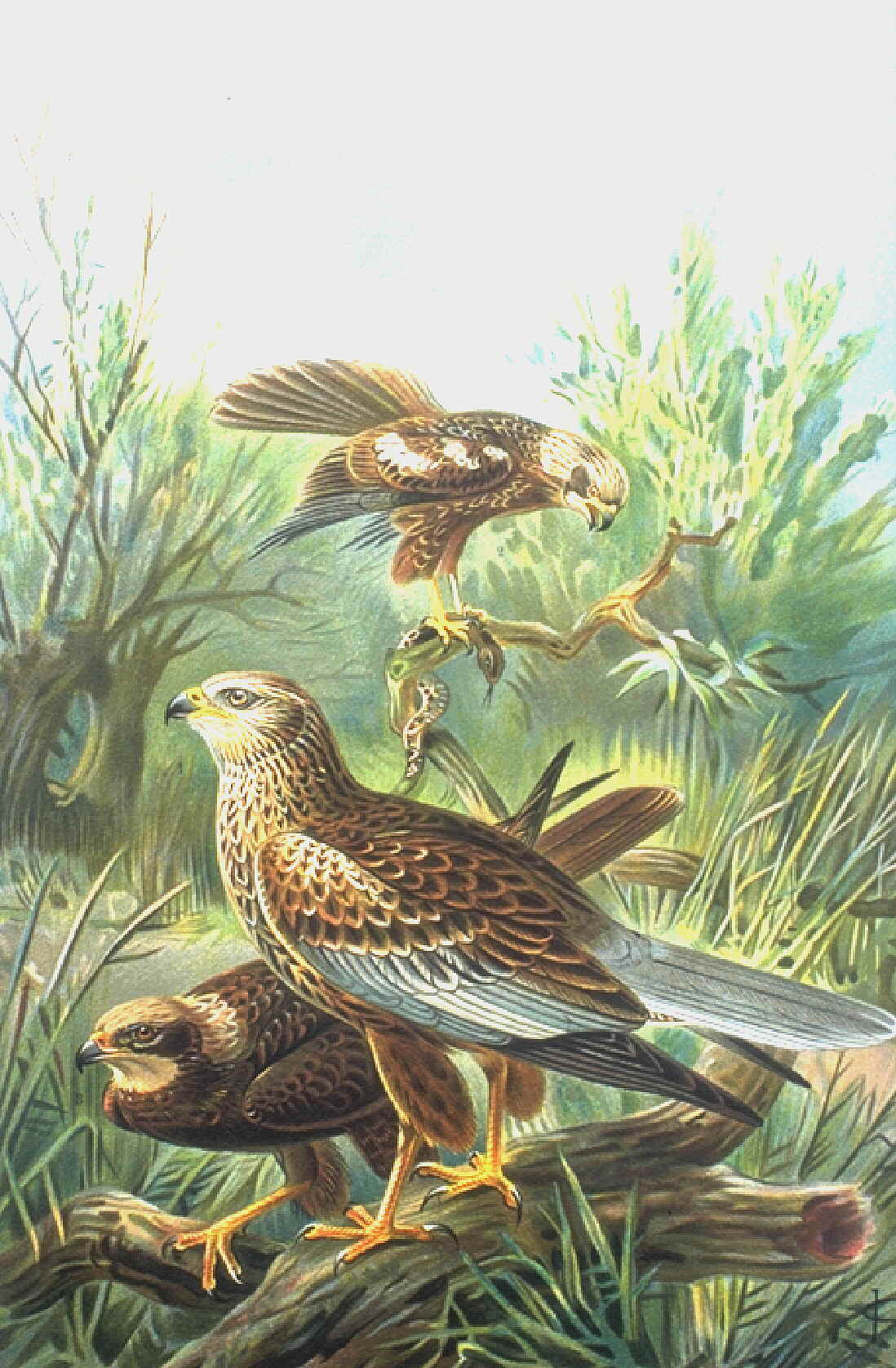
Western marsh harriers

The marsh harriers are birds of prey of the harrier subfamily. They are medium-sized raptors and the largest and broadest-winged harriers. Most of them are associated with marshland and dense reedbeds. They are found almost worldwide, excluding only the Americas.

Until recently, two species were generally recognized: the marsh harrier (Circus aeruginosus) and the African marsh harrier (C. ranivorus). The marsh harrier is now usually split into several species, sometimes as many as six. These are the western marsh harrier (C. aeruginosus), eastern marsh harrier (C. spilonotus), Papuan harrier (C. spilonotus spilothorax or C. spilothorax), swamp harrier (C. approximans), Réunion harrier (C. maillardi maillardi or C. maillardi) and Madagascar marsh harrier (C. maillardi macrosceles or C. macrosceles).

At the beginning of the 20th century, the marsh harrier was hunted to extinction in the United Kingdom. After being reintroduced from other regions, its population steadily increased until DDT threatened it, along with other raptors in the 1950s and 1960s. Since, the population has slowly and steadily increased.

== Species ==
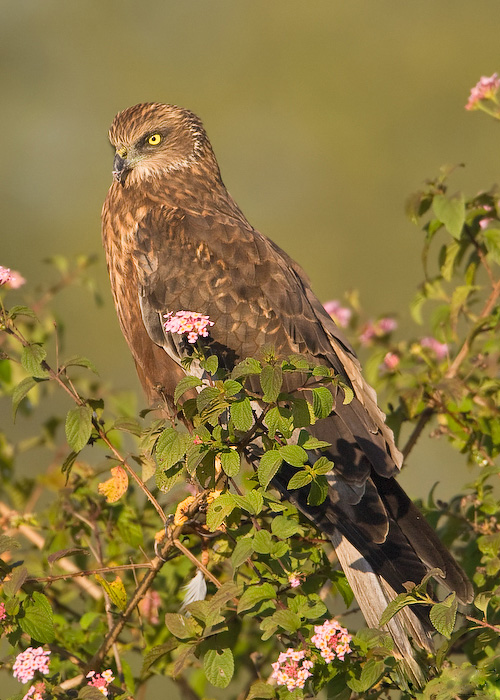
Western marsh harrier

The western marsh harrier (Circus aeruginosus), often simply called the marsh harrier, breeds widely across Europe and Asia. It is migratory except in the mildest regions, and winters mainly in Africa. It hunts small mammals, frogs, fish, insects and birds, surprising them as it drifts low over fields and reedbeds. Its long legs allow it to pluck frogs and fish from the water mid-swoop.

The western marsh harrier is a typical harrier, with long wings held in a shallow V in its low flight. It also resembles other harriers in having distinct male and female plumages, but its plumages are quite different from those of its relatives. The male has wings with grey and brown sections and black wingtips. Its head, tail and underparts are grey, except for the chestnut belly. The female is mainly brown with a cream crown and edge to her wings. It is 19–22 inches long and weighs 1–2 lbs.

The eastern marsh harrier (C. spilonotus) breeds in the grasslands and wetlands of southern Siberia, northern Mongolia, north-east China, Manchuria and Japan, and migrates for the northern winter to South-east Asia, the Philippines and northern Borneo.

Like all marsh harriers, it favours open, wet environments, and is frequently seen drifting low over rice fields, interspersing long, watchful circling glides with two or three slow, powerful wingbeats. Two subspecies are recognised: C. s. spilonotus of east Asia, and C. s. spilothorax, of New Guinea and the islands nearby, which is sometimes thought to be a separate species and is often called the Papuan harrier.

The swamp harrier (C. approximans) at about 50 to 58 cm is slightly larger than C. spilonotus, often a little darker, and has less heavily barred wings and tail. It is commonly found in suitable habitat anywhere in Australasia, particularly in the higher rainfall areas to the east, south-east, and south-west, of Australia and throughout New Zealand, but also in the tropical north of Australia and the island groups of New Caledonia, Vanuatu, Fiji, Tonga and the Society Islands. It is also known as the Australasian harrier or Pacific marsh harrier.

The Madagascar marsh harrier or Madagascar harrier (C. maillardi) is found on the Indian Ocean islands of Madagascar, Réunion and the Comoros. It is sometimes split into two species: Madagascar harrier (Circus macrosceles) and Réunion harrier (C. maillardi).

The African marsh harrier (C. ranivorus) is a distinct non-migratory species that has not usually been included as a subspecies of C. aeruginosus. It inhabits southern and eastern Africa.

== Gallery ==
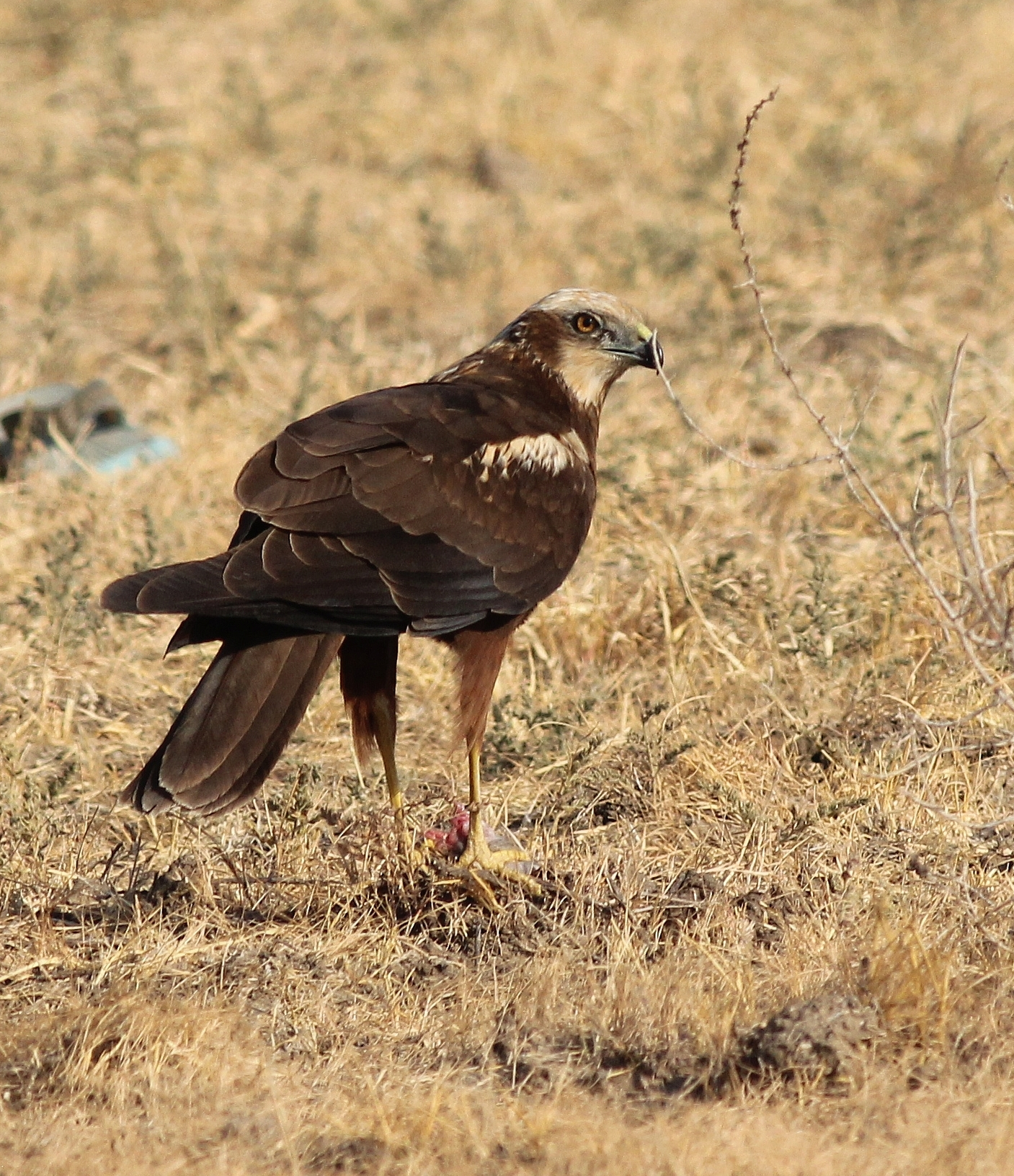
Western marsh harrier with prey, India

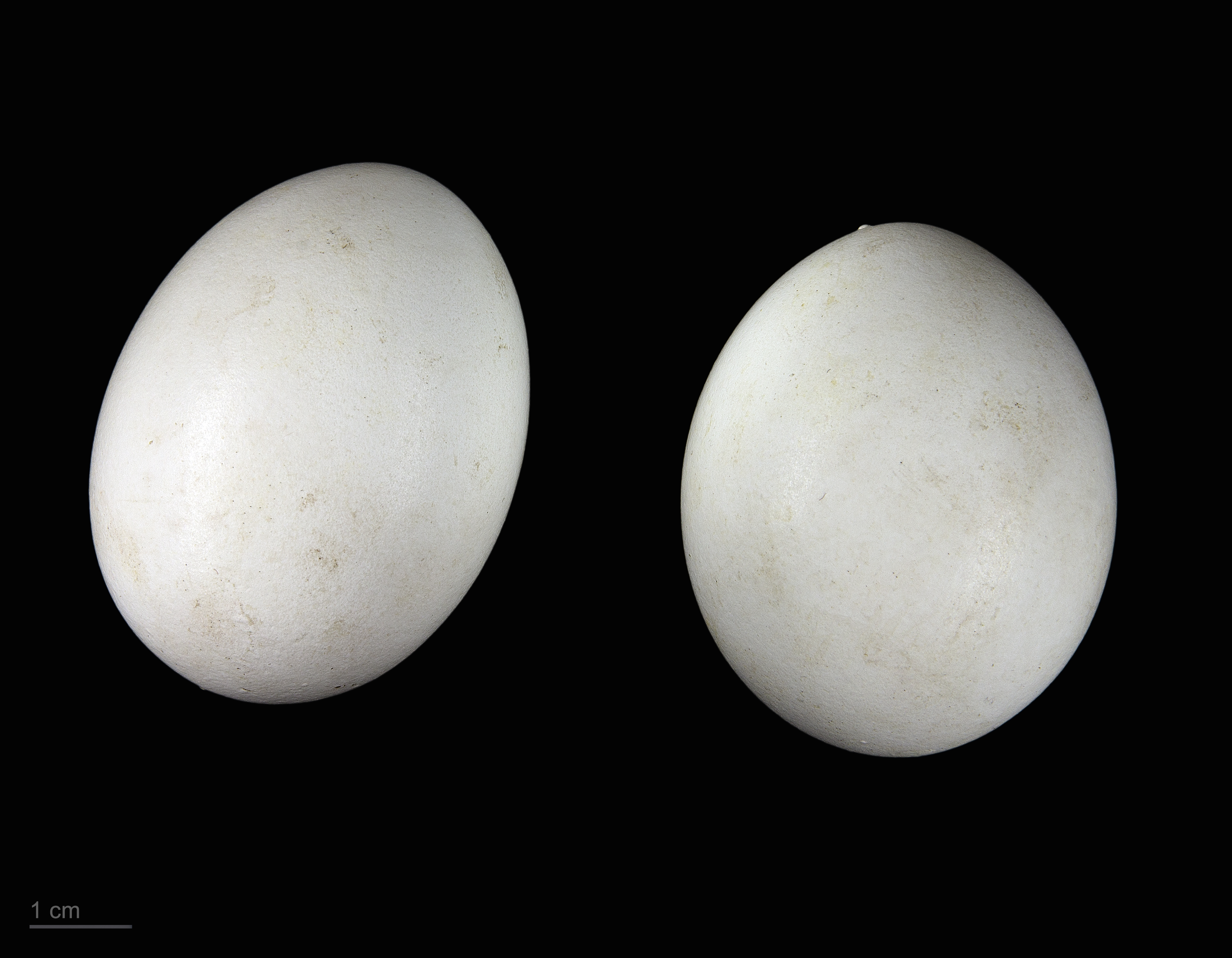
Circus aeruginosus - MHNT

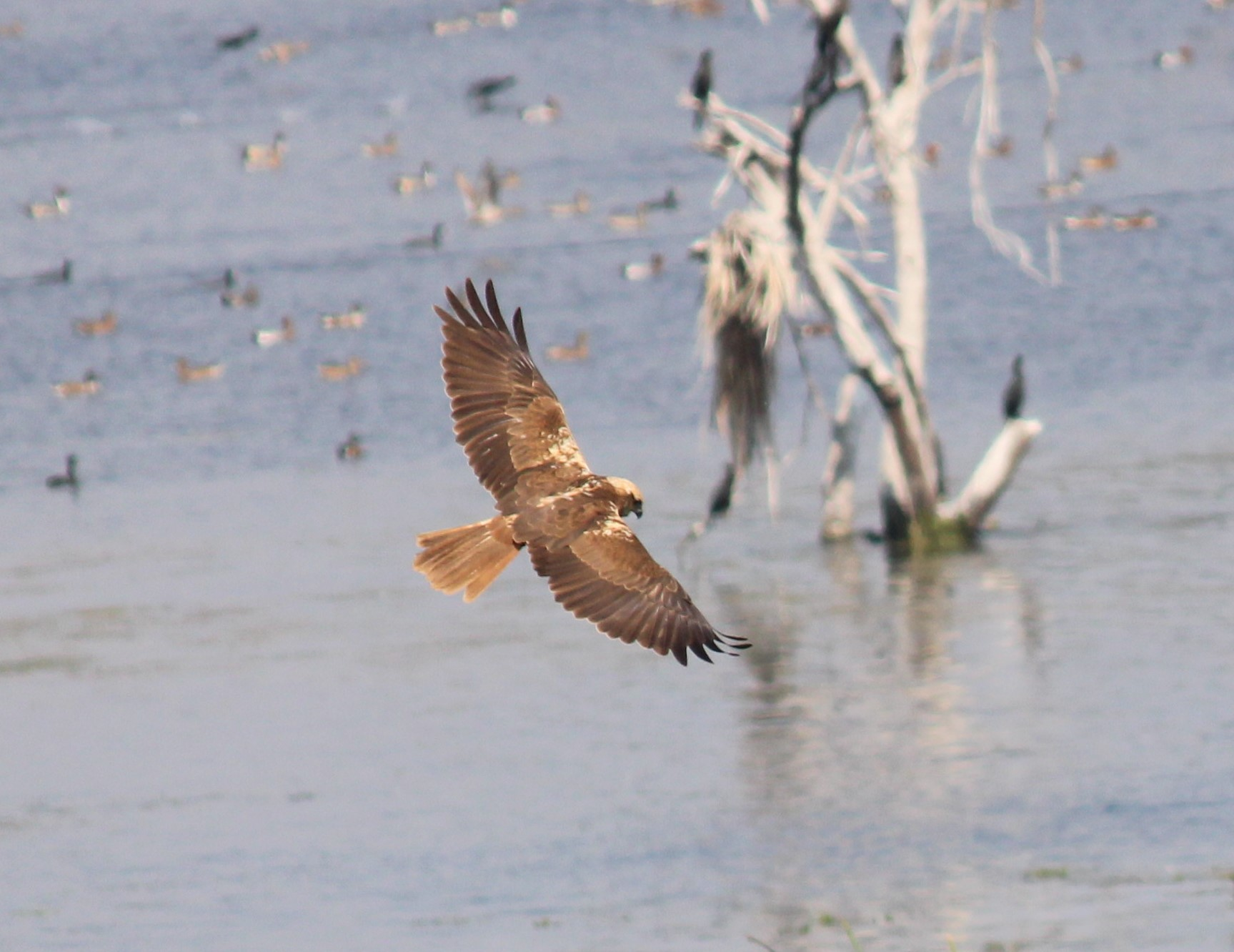
Marsh Harrier female

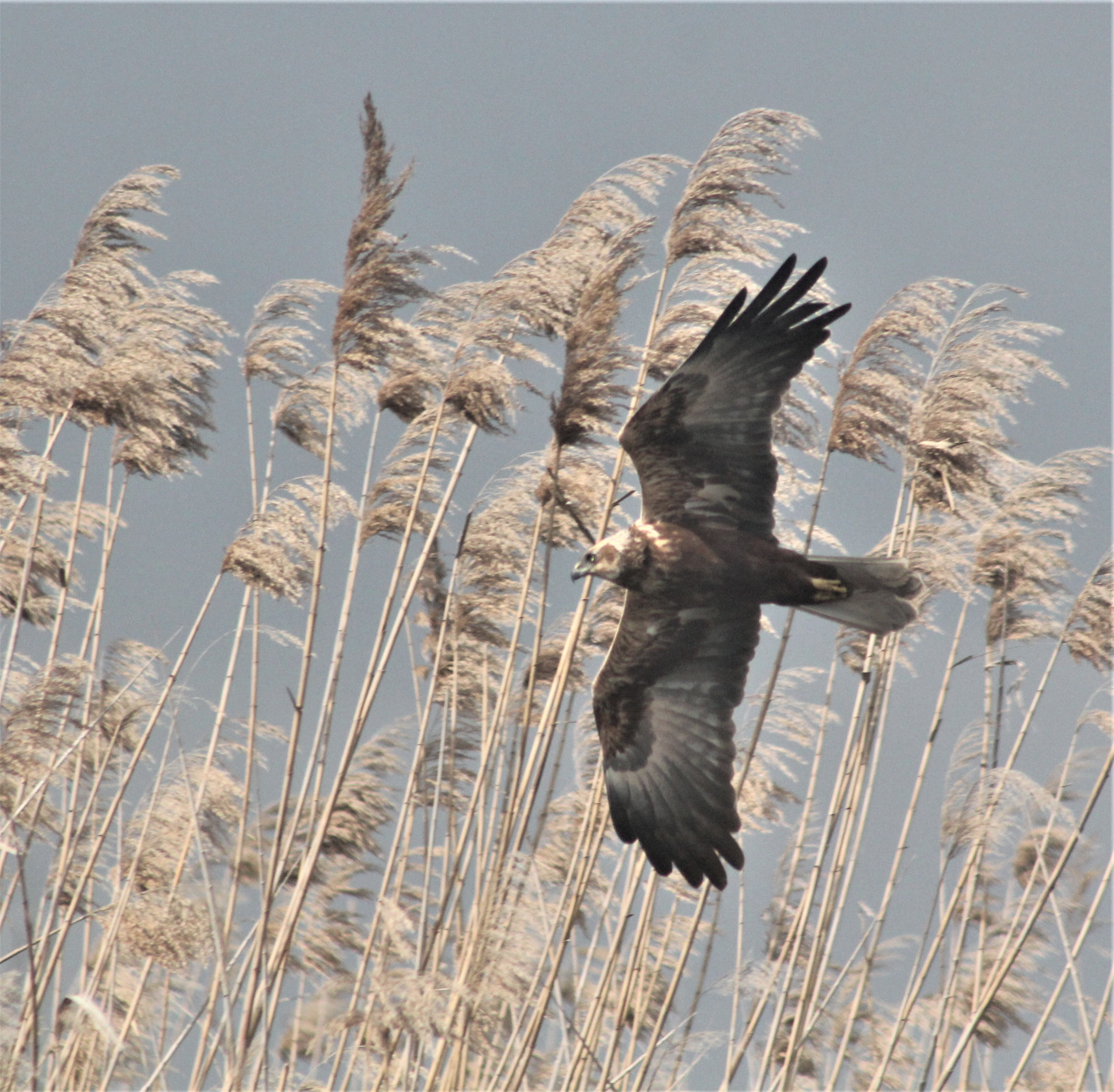
Marsh Harrier in Northern Israel
