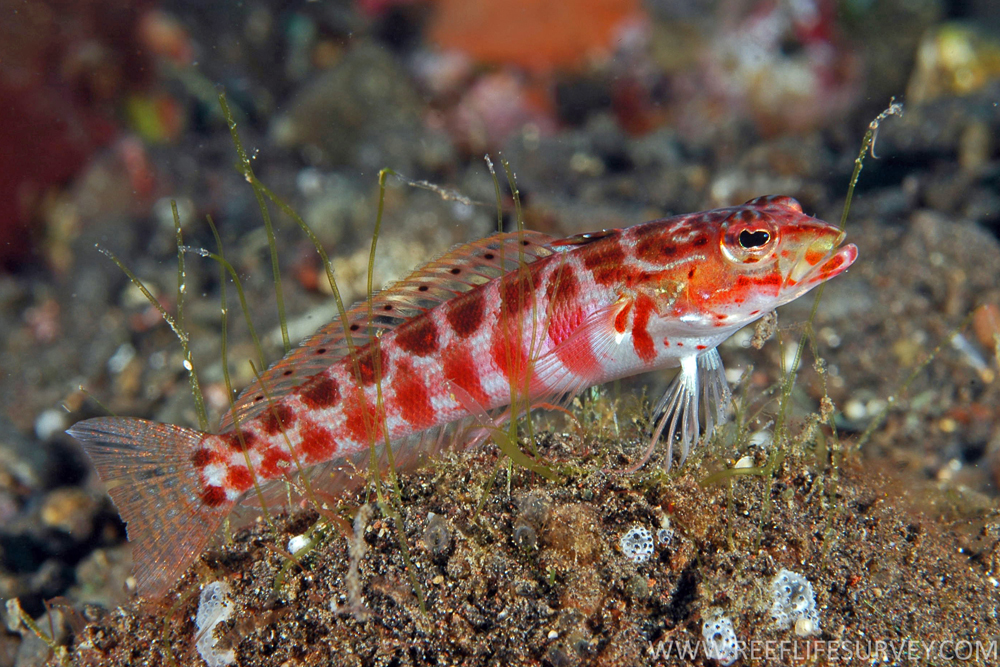
- Parapercis schauinslandii

Conservation status
- Least Concern (IUCN 3.1)

Scientific classification
- Kingdom: Animalia
- Phylum: Chordata
- Class: Actinopterygii
- Order: Labriformes
- Family: Pinguipedidae
- Genus: Parapercis
- Species: P. schauinslandii

Binomial name
- Parapercis schauinslandii (Steindachner, 1900)

Synonyms
- Percis schauinslandii Steindachner, 1900

= Parapercis schauinslandii =

Redspotted Sandperch

Species of ray-finned fish

Parapercis schauinslandii, commonly known as redspotted sandperch, lyretail grubfish or flagfin weever, is a species of marine ray-finned fish native to the Indian and Pacific Oceans. It is a member of the sandperch family Pinguipedidae, form the percomorph order Trachiniformes.

Parapercis snyderi is a strikingly coloured fish which has black or reddish to dark brown blotches on its dorsal sides, which alternate with reddish bars on the lower flanks. It has a spiny dorsal fin which is black near its base and is a deep reddish cour towards the tip. There is a second sot rayed dorsal fin with a row of dark spots. The base of the pectoral fin has two thin bright red bars and there are two dark spots on base of the caudal fin. The colour of this species varies geographically, with specimens from the Indian Ocean showing a lined pattern as opposed to a barred pattern.

This species occurs in open areas with sandy and rubble substrates on the deeper seaward and coastal slopes and on deep sandy reef flats, at depths between 9 metres (30 ft) and 170 metres (560 ft). The adults frequently swim up from the sea bed to catch prey. They mainly feed on zooplankton, and are often recorded feeding above the seabed with other fish species, or in small single species shoals of 10–50 fish. They are distributed throughout the Indo-Pacific from the coast of East Africa to Pitcairn Island, as far north as Japan and as far south as the Great Barrier Reef.

== Etymology ==
The specific name honours the German zoologist and director of the Ubersee-Museum, Bremen, Hugo Schauinsland (1857–1937) who collected in New Zealand in 1896–1897. This species is found in the aquarium trade.
