= Hugo Schauinsland =

German zoologist

Hugo Hermann Schauinsland (30 May 1857 – 5 June 1937) was a German zoologist born in Rittergut Dedawe (now in Polessky District), Kreis Labiau, Province of Prussia.

He studied natural sciences at the University of Geneva and zoology at the University of Königsberg, obtaining his doctorate in 1883. Following graduation he conducted research in Naples and Munich. In 1887 he became Gründungsdirektor (founding director) of the Städtischen Sammlungen für Naturgeschichte und Ethnographie, later to be known as the Übersee-Museum Bremen. Schauinsland served as director of the museum until his retirement in 1933. (succeeded by Carl Friedrich Roewer, 1881–1963).

In 1896–97 he conducted scientific research in the Pacific (including the Hawaiian Islands). The Hawaiian monk seal (Monachus schauinslandi) and the Redspotted sandperch (Parapercis schauinslandii) are named in his honour, as are a number of smaller creatures; (Pseudaneitea schauinslandi, Maorichiton schauinslandi, Caconemobius schauinslandi, Dolomedes schauinslandi).

During his time in the Pacific he also visited New Zealand. He was subsequently linked to a collection of Moriori and Māori ancestral remains taken from the Chatham Islands during that time. These remains were repatriated back to New Zealand in 2017.

== Selected writings ==
- "Beitrag zur Kenntniss der Embryonalentwicklung der Trematoden" [Contribution to the Knowledge of the Embryonic Development of the Trematodes]. Zeitschrift für Naturwissenschaft (in German). 16. Jena, Germany: 465–527. 1883. hdl:2027/hvd.32044107338253. OCLC 902987746.
- Beiträge zur Biologie der Hatteria [Contributions to the Biology of Hatteria] (in German). Berlin. 1898. OCLC 602271906, 83619694.
- Drei Monate auf einer Koralleninsel(Laysan) [Three Months on a Coralline Island (Laysan)] (in German). Bremen, Germany: M. Nössler. 1899. OCLC 796664506 – via Google Books.
  - Schauinsland, Hugo H. (1996) [1899]. "Three Months on a Coral Island (Laysan)" (PDF). Atoll Research Bulletin. 432. Translated by Udvardy, Miklos D.F. doi:10.5479/si.00775630.432.1. OCLC 966630935 – via Smithsonian Research Online. - English translation of Drei Monate auf einer Koralleninsel(Laysan)
- Ein Besuch auf Molokai, der Insel der Aussätzigen [A Visit to Molokai, Island of Lepers] (in German). Bremen, Germany: M. Nössler. 1900. OCLC 313976469.
- Beiträge zur Entwicklungsgeschichte und Anatomie der Wirbeltiere [On the evolution and anatomy of vertebrates] (in German). Stuttgart, Germany: Verlag von Erwin Nägele. 1903. OCLC 809921651 – via Biodiversity Heritage Library.
- Das Städtische Museum für Natur- Völker- und Handelskunde in Bremen [The Municipal Museum of Natural History and Trade in Bremen] (in German). Berlin: Centralstelle für Arbeiter-Wohlfahrtseinrichtungen. 1904. OCLC 55080921.
- Darwin und seine Lehre nebst kritischen Bemerkungen [Darwin and His Doctrine Together with Critical Remarks] (in German). Bremen, Germany: F. Leuwer. 1909. hdl:2027/mdp.39015064465225. OCLC 555206848.

== Taxon named in his honor ==
- The redspotted sandperch Parapercis schauinslandii is named after him.

== See also ==
- Ludwig Cohn
