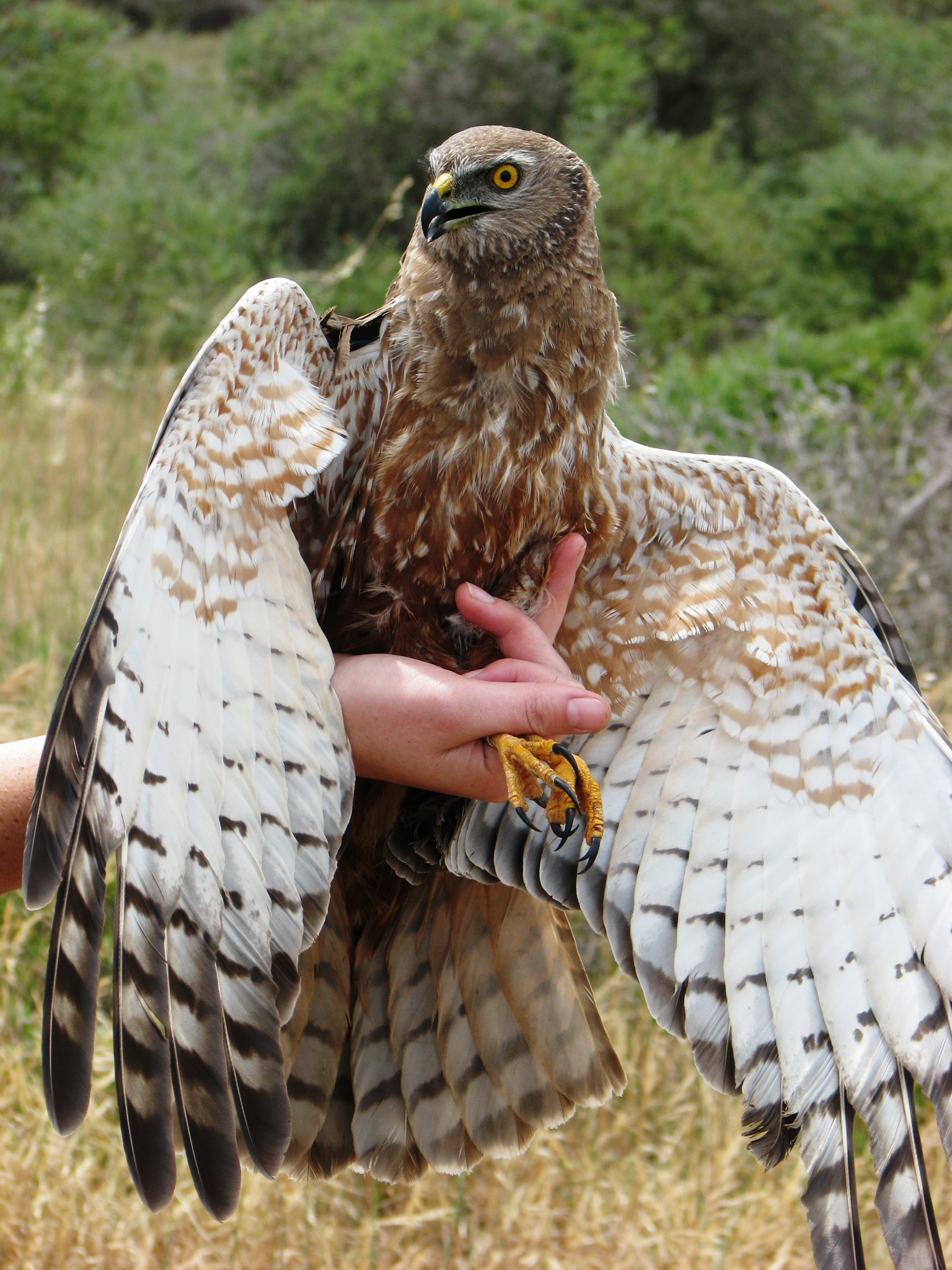

Conservation status
- Least Concern (IUCN 3.1)

Scientific classification
- Kingdom: Animalia
- Phylum: Chordata
- Class: Aves
- Order: Accipitriformes
- Family: Accipitridae
- Genus: Circus
- Species: C. ranivorus

Binomial name
- Circus ranivorus (Daudin, 1800)
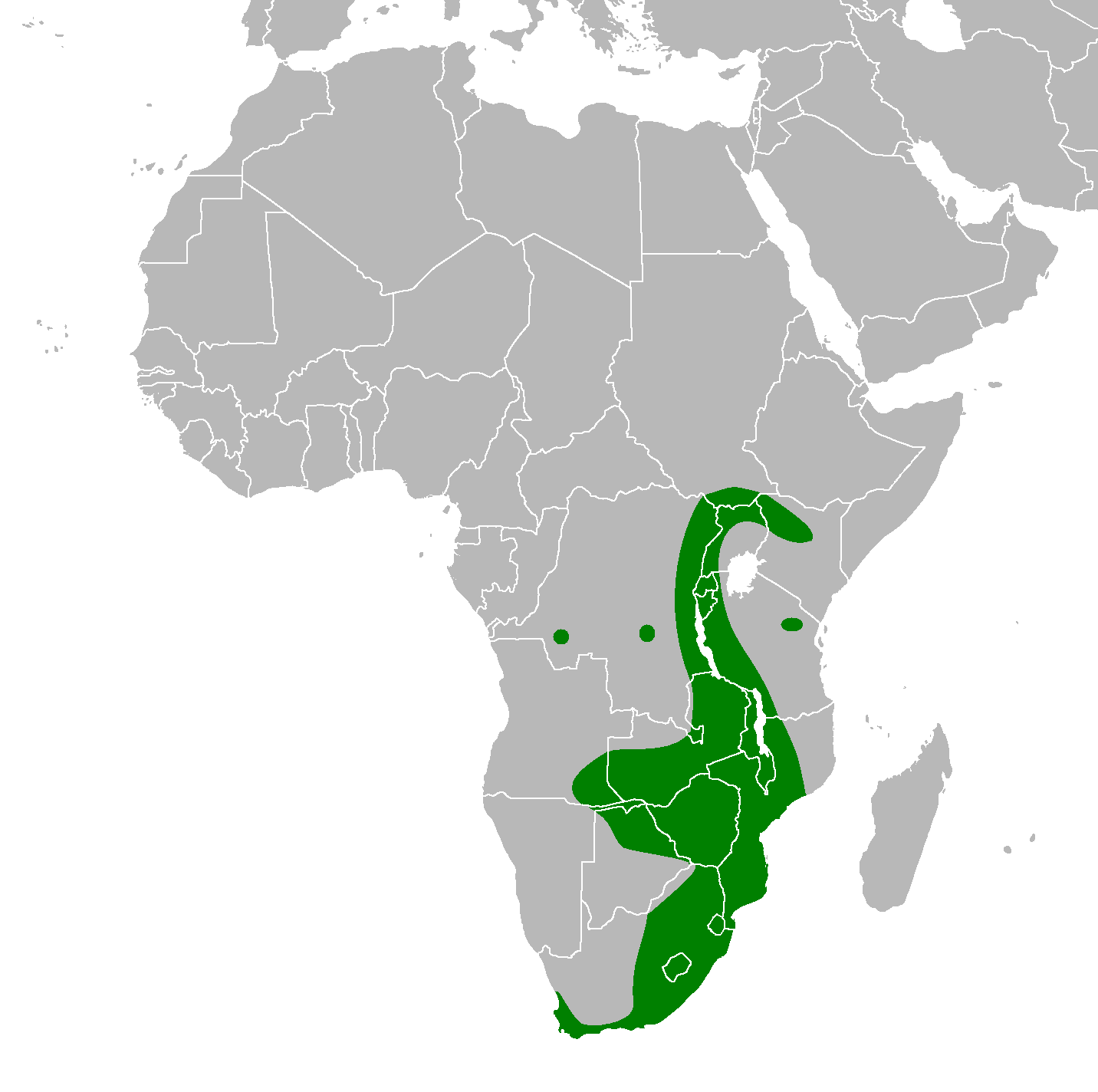

= African marsh harrier =

Species of bird

The African marsh harrier (Circus ranivorus) is a bird of prey belonging to the harrier genus Circus. It is largely resident in wetland habitats in southern, central and eastern Africa from South Africa north to South Sudan.

== Description ==
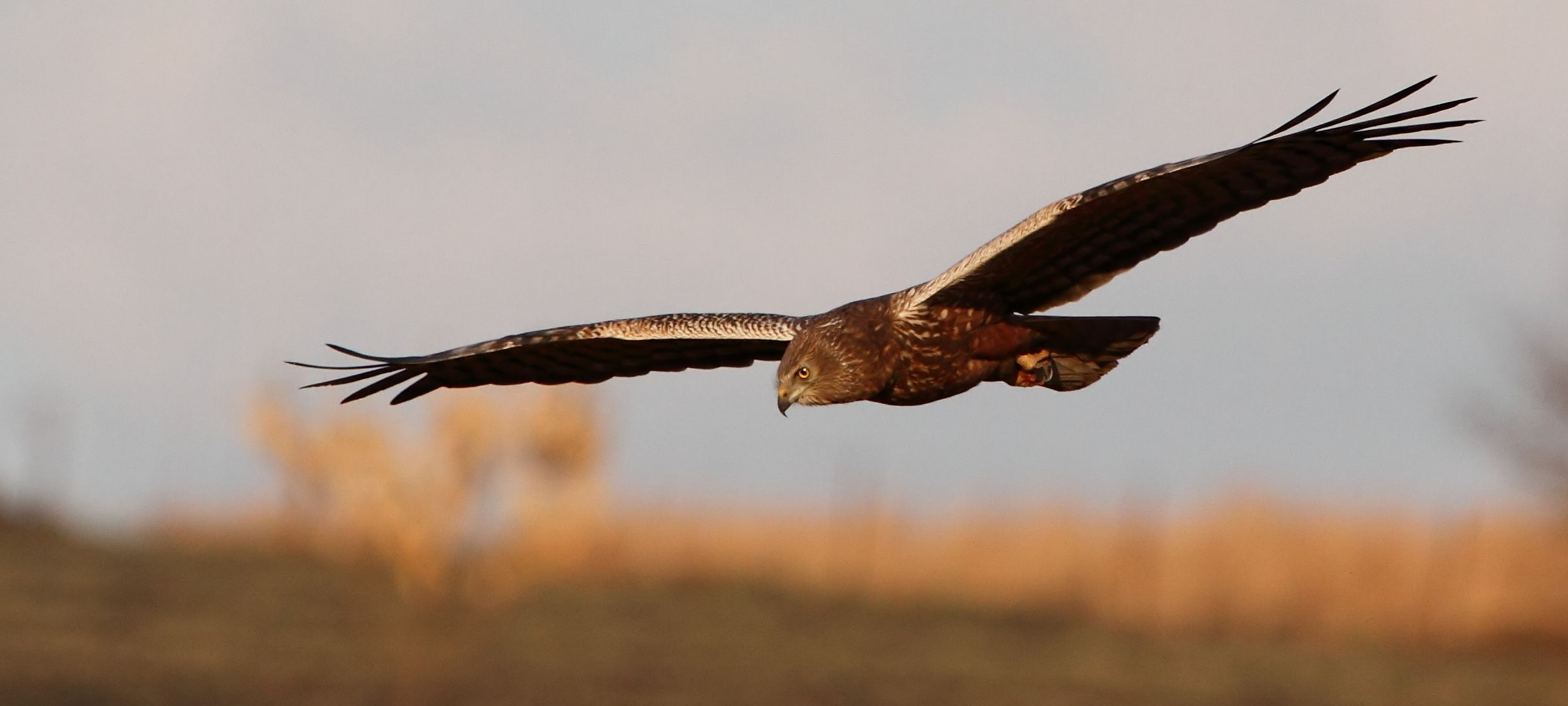
African marsh harrier, KwaZulu-Natal

African Marsh harrier females are larger than males and they are 44–47 centimetres (17–19 in) in length, with females being about 30% heavier than males (Simmons and Simmons 2000). Adults, (like the male bird right) have yellow eyes, but brown eyes when immature. Both sexes are mostly brown with pale streakings on the head, breast, forewing and rufous on the thighs and the belly. Adult males differ from females in that they have a pale grey wash to the dorsal secondaries and primaries. The female's are brown. The juvenile is dark brown and may have a pale breastband and pale markings on the head. The tail and flight feathers have dark barring at all ages, but this is rarely visible in the juvenile birds.

It resembles a small Eurasian marsh harrier but is slimmer and paler brown. It could be mistaken for an immature Montagu's harrier or pallid harrier, but the African marsh harrier can be readily distinguished from them by its lack of a white rump.

It is usually silent but the male has a high-pitched, two-note display call, and only the female has the far-carrying pseeew-pseeew food and copulation call during breeding.

== Habitat ==
The African marsh harrier is generally found in marshes or reedbeds in east Africa and hunts over open grasslands and cultivation near wetlands. Found from sea level up to 3,000 metres (9,800 ft), it predominantly occurs above 1,500 metres (4,900 ft).

== Distribution ==
The African Marsh harrier is mainly resident in the moister regions of southern and eastern Africa, from the Western Cape northwards through eastern South Africa, Lesotho, Eswatini, eastern Zimbabwe, south and western Mozambique, Malawi, southwestern Tanzania, western and central Zambia, south eastern Angola into northern Botswana, especially in the Okavango Delta, and north eastern Namibia. Disjunct populations occur in northern Tanzania, another two in the south of Democratic Republic of Congo, another in eastern Democratic Republic of Congo, Rwanda and south eastern Uganda; and the northernmost in north western Kenya, far north Uganda and South Sudan.

== Habits and ecology ==
The African marsh harrier has a varied diet which includes small mammals (70% of items) and adult birds, fledglings, lizards, frogs and large insects. It can sometimes consume birds up to the size of the Red-billed teal and the speckled pigeon. A favoured prey in some areas are doves, especially laughing doves. African marsh harriers are not found in areas with less than 300 millimetres (12 in) in annual rainfall as wetlands are sparse in regions with less rainfall, its main prey in southern Africa, the striped mouse Rhabdomys pumilio, is also restricted to this isohyet. It will also feed on larger animals such as flamingo carrion left by, for example, African fish eagles. Most prey is caught on the ground but birds and insects are often caught on the wing.

Unlike many harriers, it is monogamous and remains on the breeding territory for most of the year. In the southern Cape, birds leave for a few months post-breeding, returning in May–June. The nest is usually built in a reedbed, sometimes well above the water and two to four white eggs are laid from July to November. All eggs start out with a blue wash allowing newly laid eggs to be identified.

The African marsh harrier does not form communal roosts, unlike other harriers and normally roosts solitarily. It leaves the roost early in the morning and then flies slowly over the ground. It hunts in typical harrier fashion, usually less than 10 metres above the ground, over wetlands and adjacent drier ground.

== Conservation ==
African marsh harriers are reported to be common at many wetland sites in both eastern and southern Africa, especially in Uganda, Botswana and Zambia. In South Africa, an estimated 3,000-6,000 pairs remain, but some populations are declining and the species is regarded as regionally endangered. Outside South Africa there are still large areas of suitable habitat, e.g. the Okavango Delta in Botswana and over much of Zambia, and the species is still locally common . The population is preliminarily estimated to number between 10,000 and 100,000 individuals.

Populations are declining due to drainage and damming of wetland habitats, over-grazing and human disturbance and, possibly, pesticide poisoning.
