= Cladotaenia =

Scientific classification
- Kingdom: Animalia
- Phylum: Platyhelminthes
- Class: Cestoda
- Order: Cyclophyllidea
- Family: Taeniidae
- Genus: Cladotaenia; Cohn, 1901

Genus of flatworms

Cladotaenia is a genus of flatworms belonging to the family Taeniidae.

The genus has almost cosmopolitan distribution.

Species:

- Cladotaenia accipitris Yamaguti, 1935
- Cladotaenia circi Yamaguti, 1935
- Cladotaenia cylindracea (Bloch, 1782) Cohn, 1901
- Cladotaenia feuta Meggitt, 1933
- Cladotaenia foxi McIntosh, 1940
- Cladotaenia globifera (Batsch, 1786)
- Cladotaenia micracantha Kornyushin, 1989
- Cladotaenia spasskii Kobyshev, 1971
- Cladotaenia vulturi
