= Cladotaenia circi =

Scientific classification
- Kingdom: Animalia
- Phylum: Platyhelminthes
- Class: Cestoda
- Order: Cyclophyllidea
- Family: Taeniidae
- Genus: Cladotaenia
- Species: C. circi

Binomial name
- Cladotaenia circi Yamaguti, 1935

Species of flatworm

Cladotaenia circi is a tapeworm of the genus Cladotaenia that has birds of prey as its definitive host, such as the western marsh harrier (Circus aeruginosus), hen harrier (Circus cyaeneus), and peregrine falcon (Falco peregrinus) in Europe. It has been found at low frequencies in small mammals, such as the bank vole (Myodes glareolus) and common vole (Microtus arvalis) in Hungary and the marsh rice rat (Oryzomys palustris) in Florida.

== Literature cited ==
- Kinsella, J.M. 1988. Comparison of helminths of rice rats, Oryzomys palustris, from freshwater and saltwater marshes in Florida. Proceedings of the Helminthological Society of Washington 55(2):275–280.
- Schmidt, S. 2001. Untersuchungen zum Vorkommen von Capillaria hepatica und Metazestoden der Cyclophyllida bei Wildmäusen in Deutschland. Dr. med. vet. thesis, University of Leipzig.
