= Diplodiscidae =

Scientific classification
- Kingdom: Animalia
- Phylum: Platyhelminthes
- Class: Trematoda
- Order: Plagiorchiida
- Suborder: Echinostomata
- Family: Diplodiscidae; Cohn, 1904

Family of flukes

Diplodiscidae is a family of flatworms belonging to the order Plagiorchiida.

Genera:

- Catadiscus Cohn, 1904
- Diplodiscus Diesing, 1836
- Homalogaster Poirier, 1883
- Pseudodiplodiscus Manter, 1962
