= Wiebke Ahrndt =

German ethnologist and university lecturer

Wiebke Ahrndt (born November 6, 1963 in Braunschweig) is a German ethnologist and university lecturer. She has been director of the Überseemuseum in Bremen since 2002. She has been a professor at the University of Bremen in the Institute for Art Studies and Art Education since 2006.

== Life ==
After two semesters in Braunschweig, Wiebke Ahrndt studied Ethnology at the Georg-August-Universität Göttingen from 1984. Ethnology, Ancient History as well as Prehistory and Early History. This was followed by a year of study at the University of California Los Angeles. Ahrndt completed his studies in Bonn with a master's degree. She received her doctorate in 1995. Her studies focused on the ethnology of ancient America. From 1996, she completed a scientific traineeship at the Museum für Völkerkunde in Hamburg. She deepened her knowledge of America during an exchange program of the German Research Foundation in Mexico. She then worked in Basel as a freelancer on exhibition concepts and as a permanent curator. In 2002, she moved to the Übersee-Museum in Bremen. On May 11, 2022, she was elected President of the Deutscher Museumsbund.

== Works ==
- with Ilka Backmeister-Collacott, Peter-René Becker, Dunja Brill, Dorothea Deterts, Wolfgang Freund: All about Evil - Das Böse. Catalog of the exhibition of the Überseemuseum Bremen, 2007-2008. (ed.: Silke Seybold)
- with Andreas Lüderwaldt and Peter-Rene Becker: Asia. Continent of contrasts. Catalog for the permanent exhibition at the Übersee-Museum Bremen from 2006. von Zabern, Mainz am Rhein 2006
- (Editor:) Oceania. Lifeworlds in the South Seas. Exhibition texts. Überseemuseum Bremen. Überseemuseum, Bremen 2003
- (Collective of authors:) Indians of the Plains and Prairies. Texts and photos. [Exhibition at the Museum für Völkerkunde, Hamburg, from October 31, 1996 - August 31, 1997], ed.: Museum für Völkerkunde Hamburg, Museum für Völkerkunde, Hamburg 1997
- Red Cloud, Blue Horse. Pictures from the life of the Sioux. [Exhibition: Museum für Völkerkunde, Hamburg]. Christians, Hamburg 1997, ISBN 3-7672-1277-3.
