= Smithsonian Research Online =

Smithsonian Research Online is a database of bibliographic citations and full texts of publications by Smithsonian Institution scholars. It is managed by the Smithsonian Institution Libraries. Access to the database is free.

The database contained some 10,000 citations as of 2011. An increasing proportion of the citations includes full texts.

Purposes of the database include facilitating discovery of Smithsonian research publications and "assisting in measuring and communicating the magnitude, value, and impact of Smithsonian research."
