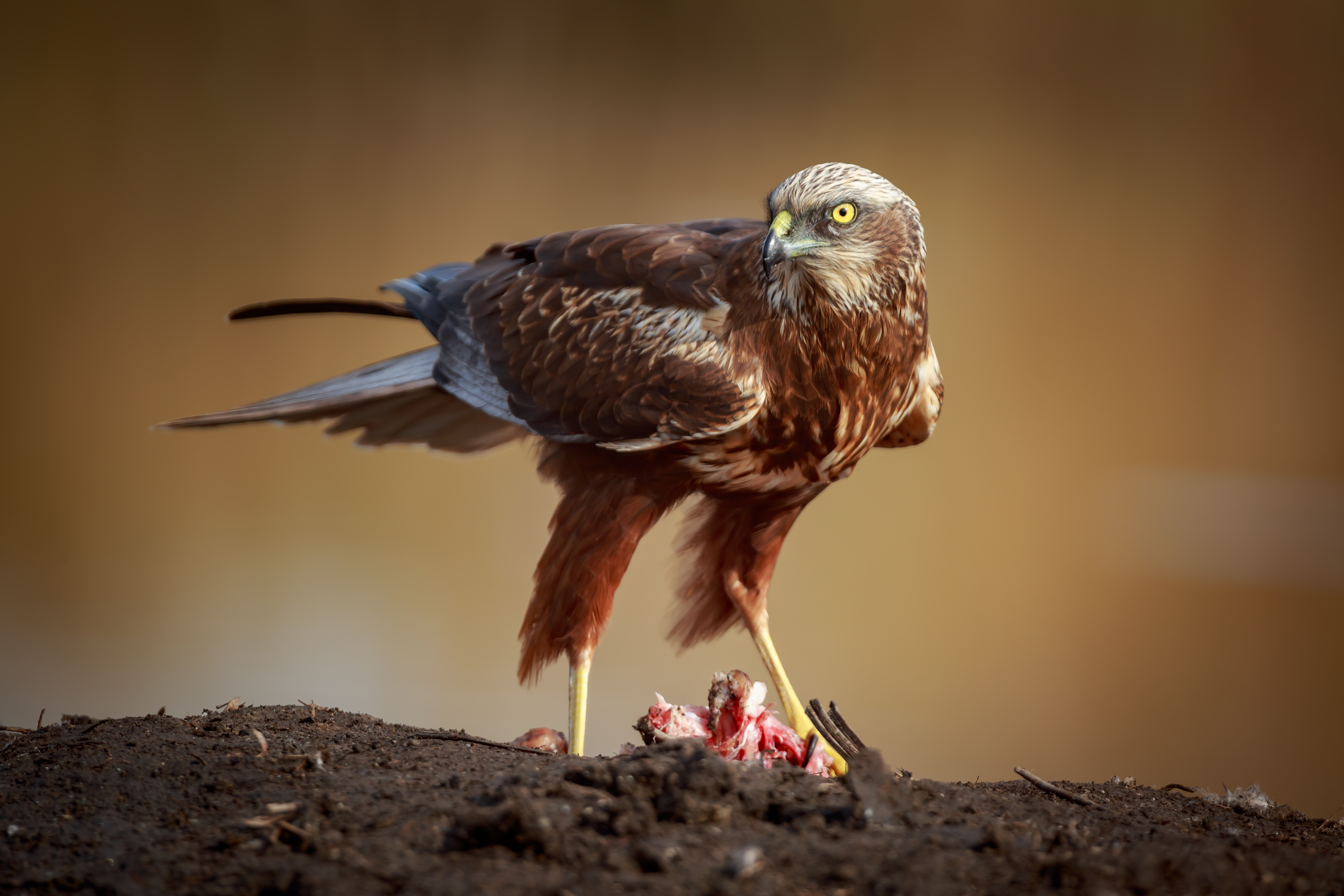
- Western marsh harrier

Scientific classification
- Kingdom: Animalia
- Phylum: Chordata
- Class: Aves
- Order: Accipitriformes
- Family: Accipitridae
- Subfamily: Accipitrinae
- Genus: Circus; Lacépède, 1799

Type species
- Circus aeruginosus Linnaeus, 1758

Species
- See text

= Harrier (bird) =

Circus

Genus of birds

A harrier is a member of the genus Circus in Accipitridae, a family of birds of prey. Harriers characteristically hunt by flying low over open ground, feeding on small mammals, reptiles, or birds. The young of the species are sometimes referred to as ring-tail harriers. They are distinctive with long wings, a long narrow tail, the slow and low flight over grasslands and skull peculiarities. The harriers are thought to have diversified with the expansion of grasslands and the emergence of C_{4} grasses about 6 to 8 million years ago during the Late Miocene and Pliocene.

== Taxonomy ==
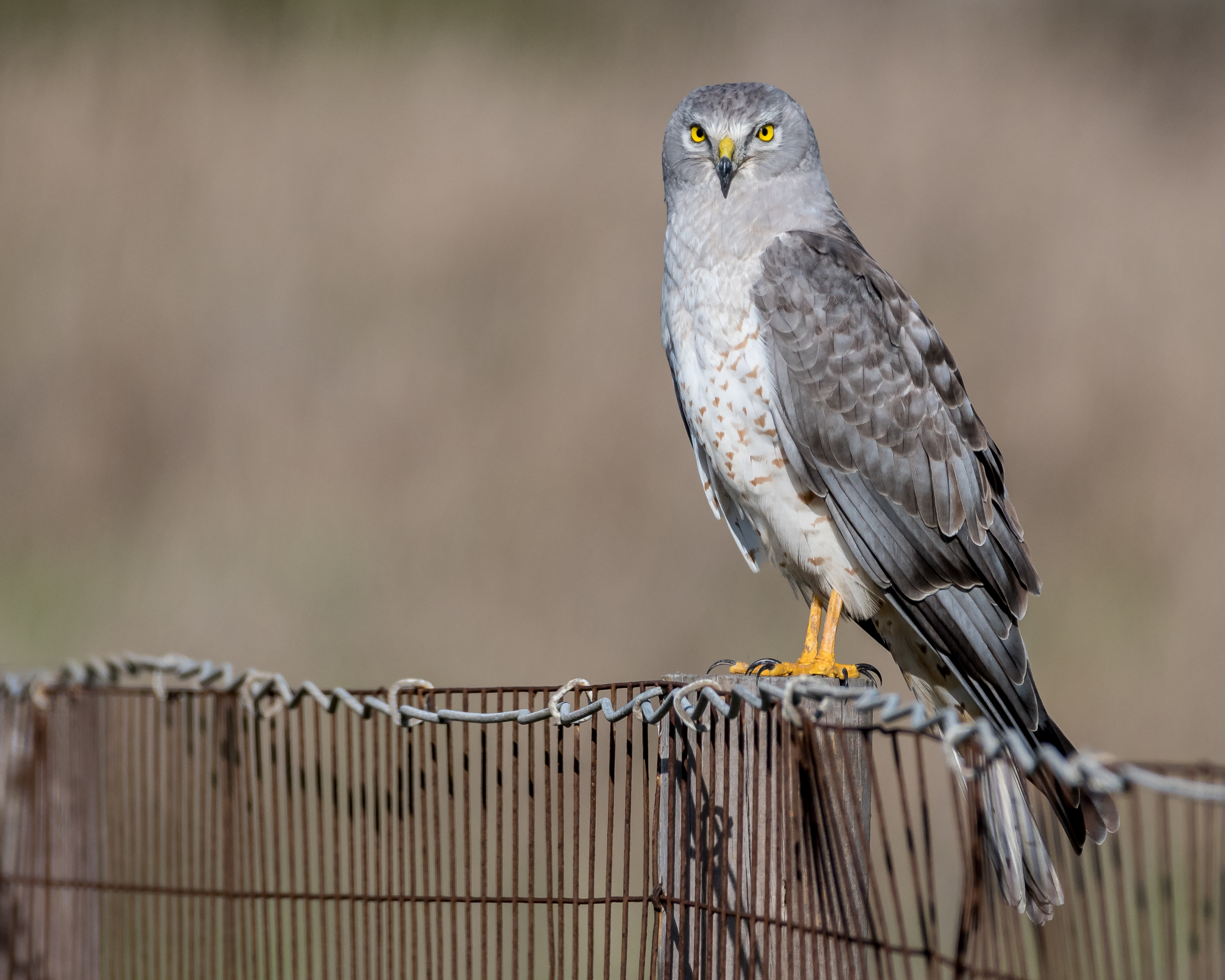
Northern harrier, adult male

The genus Circus was introduced by the French naturalist Bernard Germain de Lacépède in 1799. The type species was subsequently designated as the western marsh harrier. Most harriers are placed in this genus. The word Circus comes from the Ancient Greek κρέξ (kréx) referring to a long legged bird, and is possibly ultimately derived from an onomatopoeia. The name harrier is thought to have been derived either from the dog breed of the same name, or by a corruption of harrower, or directly from harry.

The genera Circus has in the past been placed in the subfamily Circinae but molecular phylogenetic studies have shown that this grouping is polyphyletic, nested within the Accipitrinae. The harrier-hawks in the genus Polyboroides are not closely related and are placed in their own subfamily Polyboroidinae

=== Ring-tails ===
Ring-tail is an informal term used by birders for the juveniles and females of several harrier species when seen in the field and not identifiable to an exact species. Ring-tail harriers include the juveniles and females of Montagu's harrier (Circus pygargus), hen harrier (Circus cyaneus), and pallid harrier (Circus macrourus).

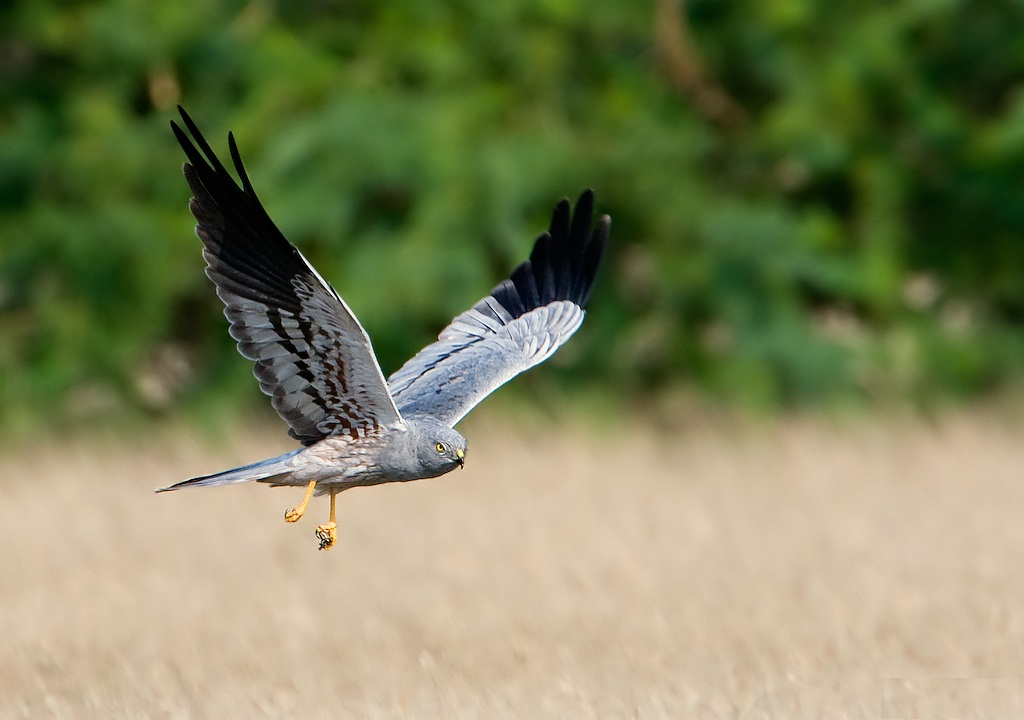
A male Montagu's harrier displays the signature upswept wings and grassland habitat.

== Species ==
The genus contains 16 species:

Genus Circus – Lacépède, 1799 – sixteen species
Common name	Scientific name and subspecies	Range	Size and ecology	IUCN status and estimated population
Montagu's harrier	Circus pygargus (Linnaeus, 1758)	Eurasia, winters in Africa and India	Size: Habitat: Diet:	LC
Hen harrier	Circus cyaneus (Linnaeus, 1766)	Eurasia	Size: Habitat: Diet:	LC
Northern harrier	Circus hudsonius (Linnaeus, 1766)	North America	Size: Habitat: Diet:	LC
Western marsh harrier	Circus aeruginosus (Linnaeus, 1758) Two subspecies: C. a. aeruginosus (Linnaeus, 1758); C. a. harterti Zedlitz, 1914	Europe, western Asia; winter range includes Africa and India.	Size: Habitat: Diet:	LC
Eastern marsh harrier	Circus spilonotus Kaup, 1847	Asia (migratory)	Size: Habitat: Diet:	LC
African marsh harrier	Circus ranivorus (Daudin, 1800)	southern and central Africa	Size: Habitat: Diet:	LC
Swamp harrier	Circus approximans Peale, 1849	New Zealand, Australia, Pacific islands	Size: Habitat: Diet:	LC
Papuan harrier	Circus spilothorax Salvadori & D'Albertis, 1875	New Guinea	Size: Habitat: Diet:	LC
Malagasy harrier	Circus macrosceles Newton, 1863	Indian Ocean (Madagascar and the Comoro Islands)	Size: Habitat: Diet:	EN
Réunion harrier	Circus maillardi J. Verreaux, 1862	(Indian Ocean) Réunion Island	Size: Habitat: Diet:	EN
Long-winged harrier	Circus buffoni (Gmelin, JF, 1788)	South America	Size: Habitat: Diet:	LC
Spotted harrier	Circus assimilis Jardine & Selby, 1828	Australia, Indonesia	Size: Habitat: Diet:	LC
Black harrier	Circus maurus (Temminck, 1828)	southern Africa	Size: Habitat: Diet:	EN
Cinereous harrier	Circus cinereus Vieillot, 1816	South America	Size: Habitat: Diet:	LC
Pallid harrier	Circus macrourus (S. G. Gmelin, 1770)	migratory: eastern Europe, Asia, Africa (winter)	Size: Habitat: Diet:	LC
Pied harrier	Circus melanoleucos (Pennant, 1769)	Asia	Size: Habitat: Diet:	LC

=== Fossils ===
- † Eyles's harrier, Circus teauteensis (prehistoric)
- † Wood harrier, Circus dossenus (prehistoric)
