= Ludwig Cohn =

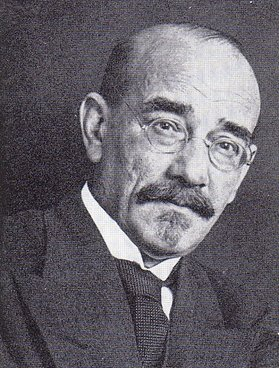
Ludwig Cohn (1873-1935)

Ludwig Cohn (1873 – 1935) was a German naturalist and zoologist.

Beginning in 1904 he worked as a zoological assistant at the Städtischen Museum für Natur-, Völker- und Handelskunde (Municipal Museum of natural history, ethnology and trade history) in Bremen, under the direction of Hugo Schauinsland (1857–1937). In 1920 he was promoted to head of the natural history department at the museum. He is known for two scientific trips to what is now part of Papua New Guinea, being sponsored by the Bremen museum.

His first journey (1908/09) was to the Solomon Islands. With explorer Karl Nauer (1874–1962), he performed scientific research on Buka and Bougainville, collecting an array of natural and ethnographic objects. As a result of the expedition, a Junggesellenhaus (bachelor dwelling) from the island of Tijob, and a Familienwohnhaus (family house) from the settlement of Toboroi, became centerpieces at the opening of the South Seas Exhibition (1911) at the Bremen museum.

His second expedition (1911/12) was to the Admiralty Islands, where along with zoological items, he acquired a number of ethnographic objects, including a collection of carvings that became an important part of the ethnographic "Oceania collection" at the museum. Many of Cohn's museum artifacts were lost during World War II.
