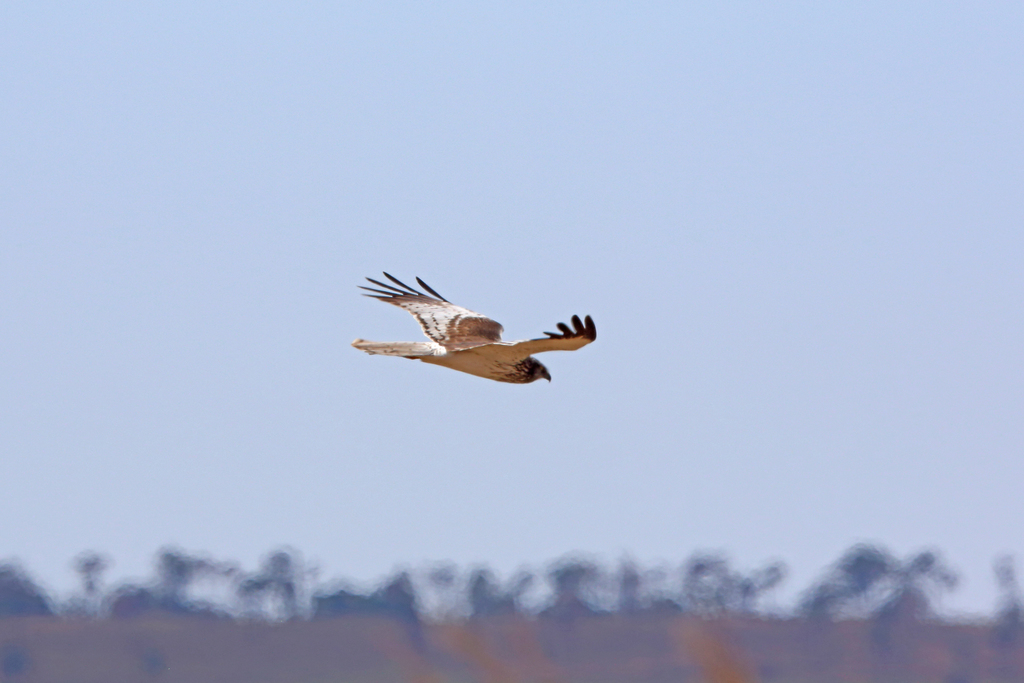

Conservation status
- Endangered (IUCN 3.1)

Scientific classification
- Kingdom: Animalia
- Phylum: Chordata
- Class: Aves
- Order: Accipitriformes
- Family: Accipitridae
- Genus: Circus
- Species: C. macrosceles

Binomial name
- Circus macrosceles Newton, 1863

Synonyms
- Circus maillardi macrosceles

= Malagasy harrier =

Species of bird

The Malagasy harrier (Circus macrosceles) is a bird of prey belonging to the marsh harrier group of harriers. It inhabits Madagascar and the Comoro Islands in the Indian Ocean. It was formerly regarded as a subspecies of the Réunion harrier (C. maillardi) but is increasingly treated as a separate species. It is also known as the Madagascar harrier, Madagascar marsh harrier or Malagasy marsh harrier.

== Description ==
It is about 42–55 cm (17–22 in) long; the female is up to 13% larger than the male. The male has a blackish back and a greyer head with dark streaks. The underparts and rump are whitish and the tail is grey with dark bars. The forewings and wingtips are blackish while the secondaries are grey with dark bars. Females are browner than the males.

The Réunion harrier is smaller and darker with shorter legs and shorter, more rounded wings. Males have a blacker head and plainer secondaries and tail.

== Distribution and habitat ==
In Madagascar it is found in marshland and grassland across the island except for the south. It is generally scarce with the largest numbers in the north-west. It occurs from sea-level up to 1,800 m (5,900 ft). On the Comoros it is more often found in drier habitats and in forested areas. It has occurred on all four main islands, but there are no recent records from Mayotte.

Its population size is estimated to be between 100 – 499 mature individuals. It is thought to be declining as a result of hunting and habitat destruction and is classed as endangered by BirdLife International.

== Behaviour ==
It feeds mainly on birds such as the Madagascar partridge and also takes reptiles, amphibians, rodents and insects. It typically feeds by flying low over the ground and dropping down rapidly when it spots its prey. It will also hunt over the canopy of forests.

It breeds in marshland, building a nest of grass and stems on the ground or low in a bush. The white eggs are incubated for about 32–34 days and the young birds fledge after 42–45 days.
