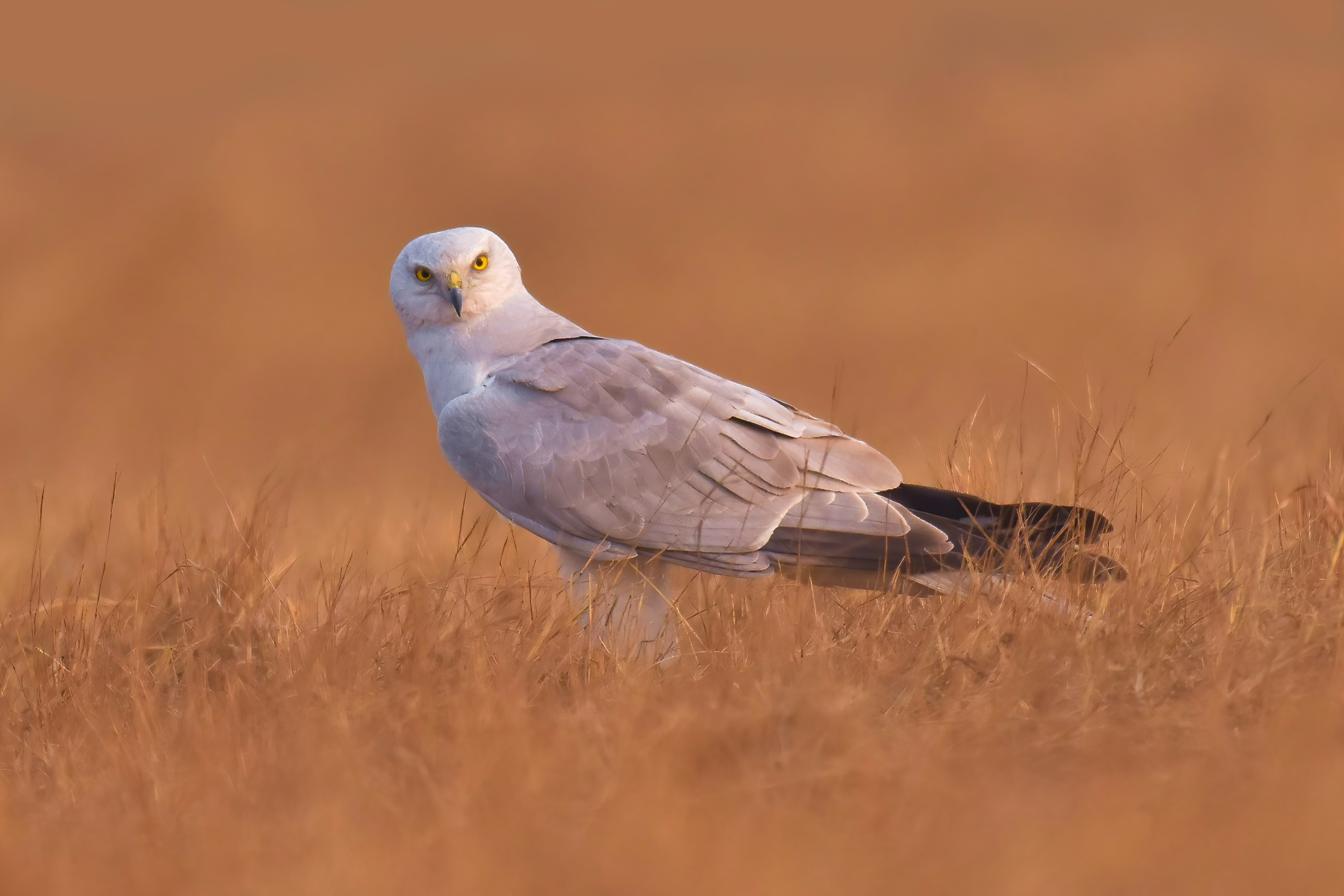
- Male
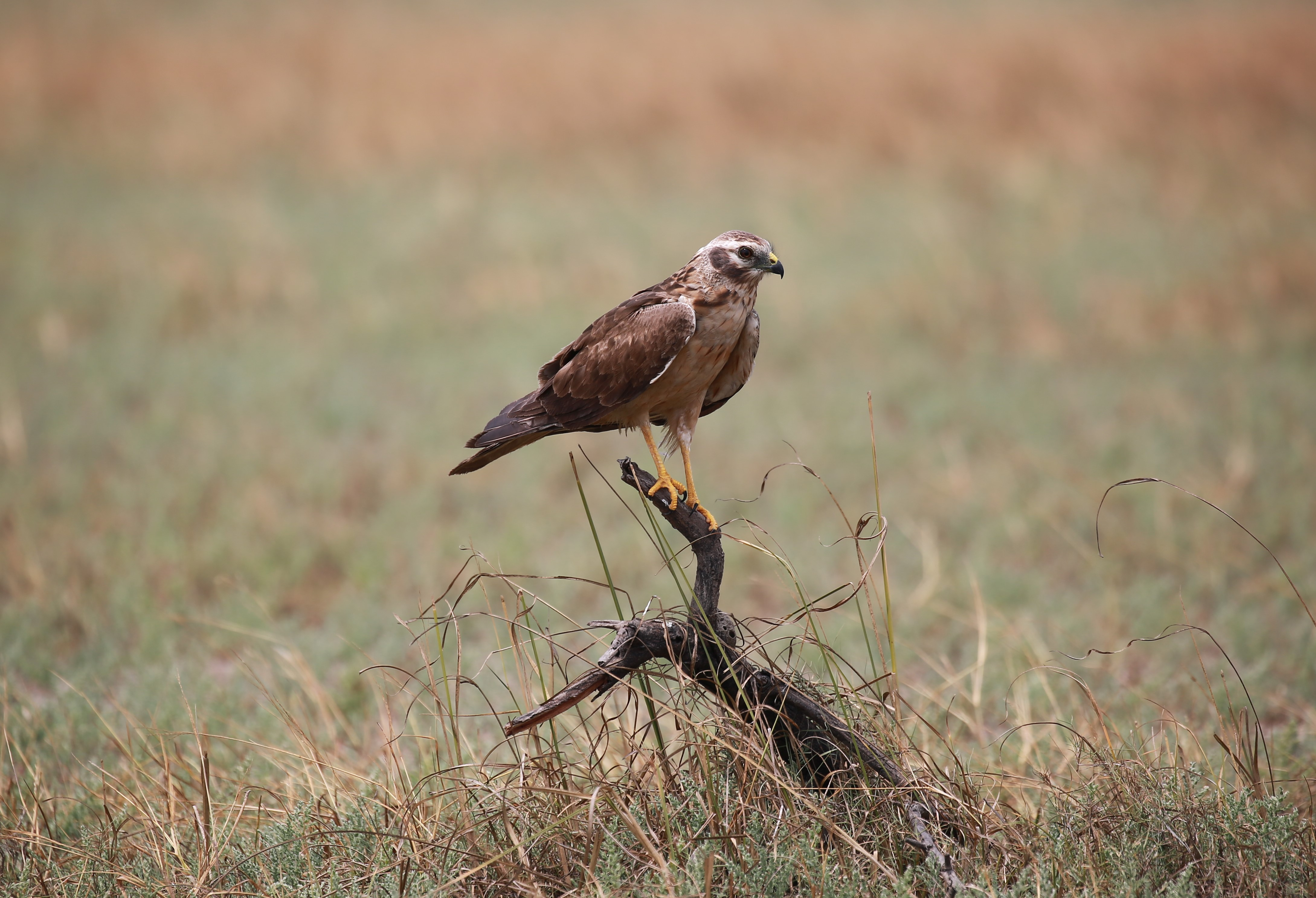
- Female

Conservation status
- Near Threatened (IUCN 3.1)

Scientific classification
- Kingdom: Animalia
- Phylum: Chordata
- Class: Aves
- Order: Accipitriformes
- Family: Accipitridae
- Genus: Circus
- Species: C. macrourus

Binomial name
- Circus macrourus (Gmelin, SG, 1770)
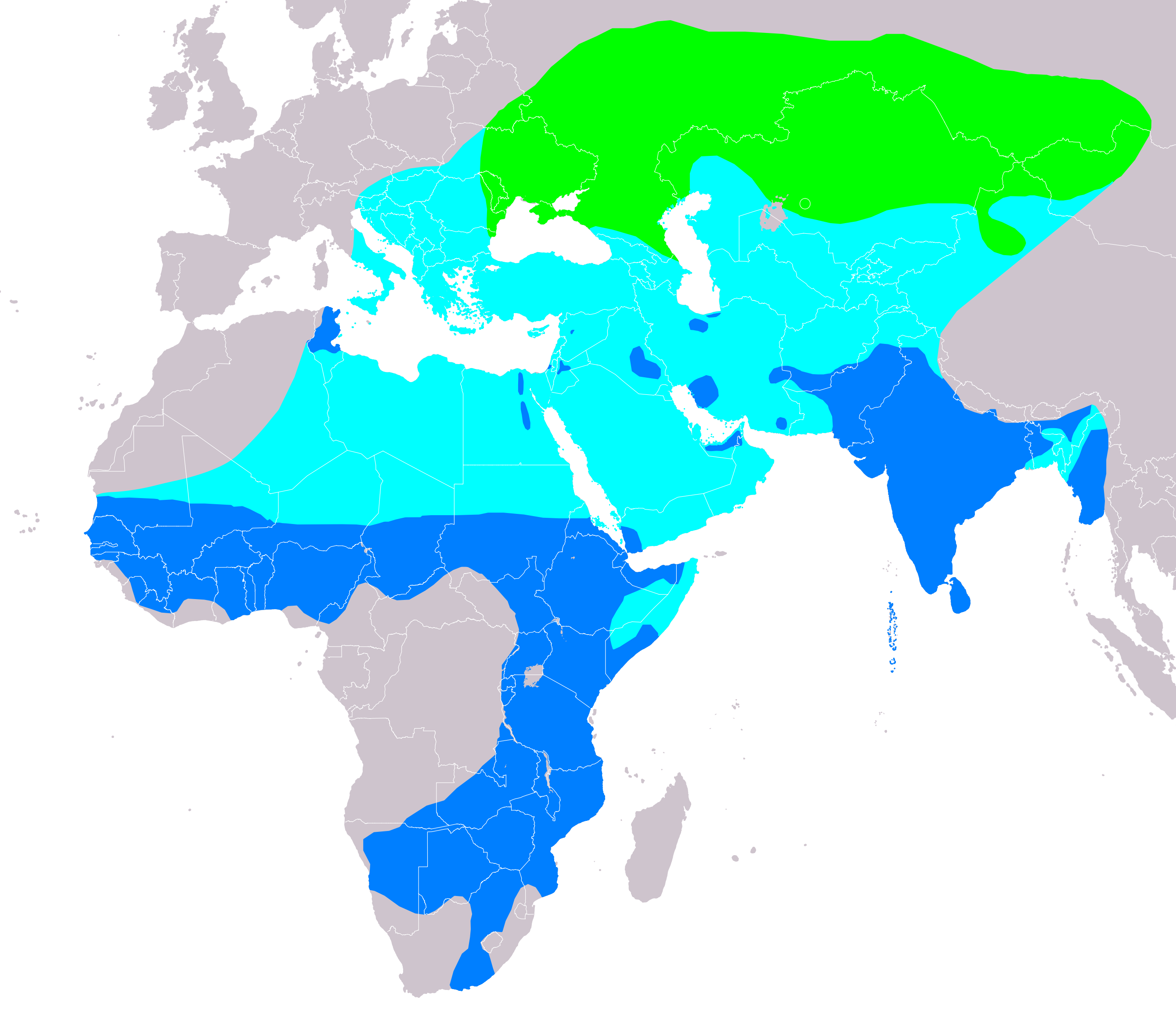
- Range of C. macrourus Breeding Passage Non-breeding

= Pallid harrier =

Species of bird

The pallid harrier (Circus macrourus) is a species of harrier, a bird of prey in the family Accipitridae. It breeds in southern parts of eastern Europe and central Asia and Iran and winters mainly in India and southeast Asia. It is a rare but increasing vagrant to Great Britain and western Europe. In 2017 a pair of pallid harriers nested in a barley field in the Netherlands; they raised four chicks, the first recorded breeding of the species in the country. In 2019, a pair bred in Spain for the first time.

This medium-sized raptor breeds on open plains, bogs and heathland. In winter it is a bird of open country.

== Taxonomy ==
The scientific name is Ancient Greek. Circus is from kirkos (circle), referring to a bird of prey named for its circling flight ('probably the hen harrier), and macrourus is "long-tailed", from makros (long) and -ouros (-tailed).

== Description ==
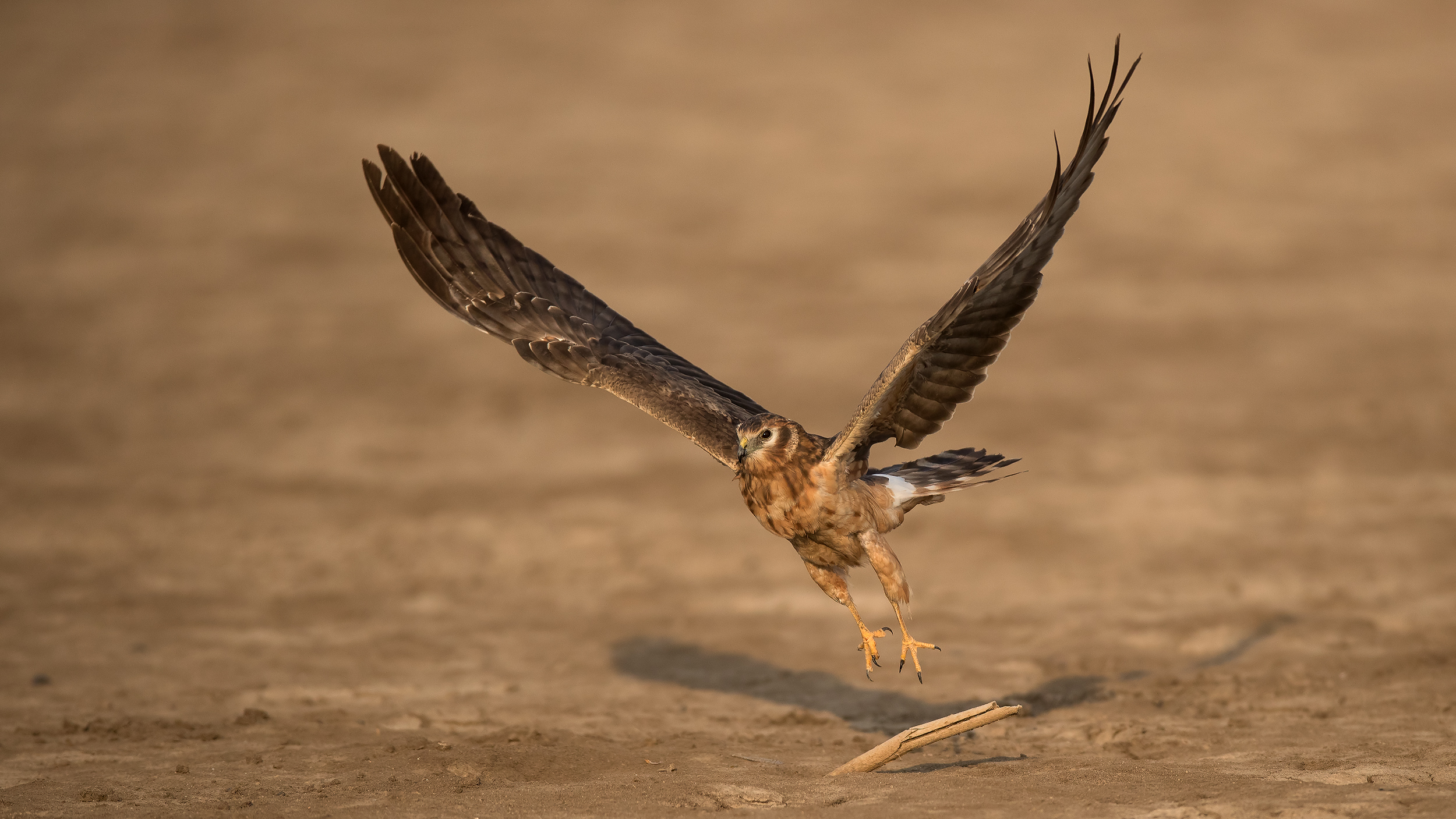
Pallid harrier in Little Rann of Kutch

This is a typical harrier, with long wings held in a shallow V in its low flight. It also resembles other harriers in having distinct male and female plumages. Adults measure 40–48 cm (16–19 in) long with a wingspan of 95–120 cm (37–47 in). Males weigh 315 g (11.1 oz) while the slightly larger females weigh 445 g (15.7 oz). The male is whitish grey above and white below, with narrow black wingtips. It differs from the hen harrier in its smaller size, narrower wings, paler colour, and different wing tip pattern. The female is brown above with white upper tail coverts, hence females and the similar juveniles are often called "ringtails". Her underparts are buff streaked with brown. It is very similar to the female Montagu's harrier, but has a paler belly and a well defined facial pattern.

== Behaviour and ecology ==
Pallid harriers primarily hunt small mammals and birds, surprising them as they drift low over fields and moors. Other food sources include large insects (typically grasshoppers and locusts), lizards and frogs. The nest of this species is on the ground. Three to six, but typically four to five whitish eggs are laid.
