= Overseas Museum, Bremen =

Natural History and ethnographic museum in northern Germany

Overseas Museum Übersee-Museum Bremen
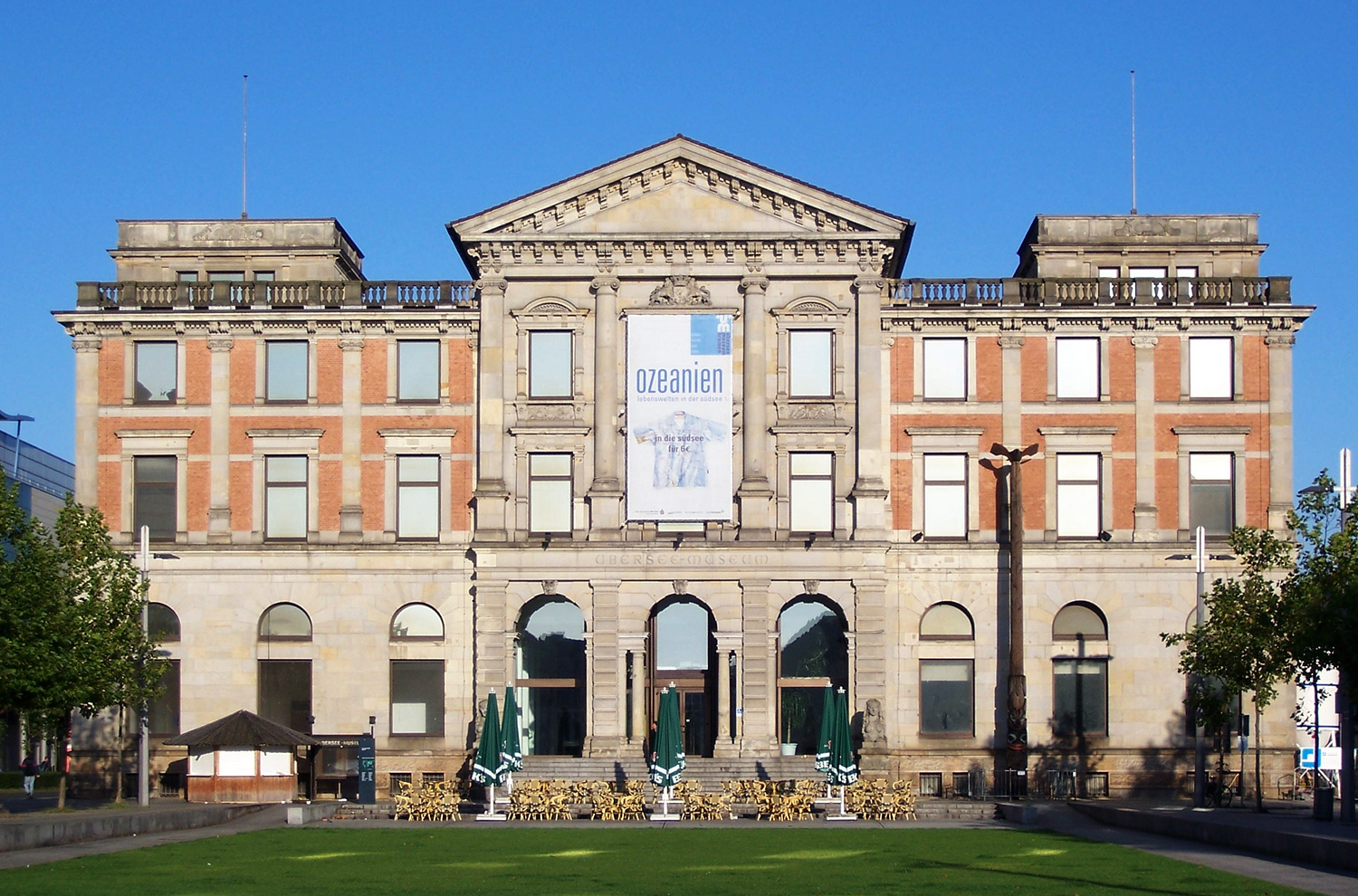
- The museum
- Former name: German Colonial Museum (German: Deutsches Kolonialmuseum)
- Established: 1887
- Location: Bremen
- Coordinates: 53°05′00″N 8°48′38″E
- Collection size: Natural History
- Director: Wiebke Ahrndt
- Website: www.uebersee-museum.de

The Overseas Museum in Bremen (German: Übersee Museum Bremen) is a Natural History and ethnographic museum in northern Germany. In an integrated exhibition of Nature, Culture and Trading, the museum presents aspects of overseas regions with permanent exhibitions relating to Asia, South Pacific/Oceania, Americas and Africa. The building is protected by the monument protection act.

== History ==
In 1875, the collections of the Bremen Natural History Society became the property of the city of Bremen.

== Directors ==
- 1887 to 1933 Hugo Schauinsland, zoologist
- 1933 to 1945 Carl Friedrich Roewer (1881–1963), zoologist
- 1950 to 1962 Helmuth O. Wagner (1897–1977), ornithologist
- 1962 to 1971 Hermann Friedrich (1906–1997), biologist
- 1971 to 1975 Herbert Abel (1911–1994),
- 1975 to 1992 Herbert Ganslmayr (1937–1991), ethnologist
- 1992 to 2001 Viola König (born 1952)
- from 2002 Wiebke Ahrndt (born 1963)
