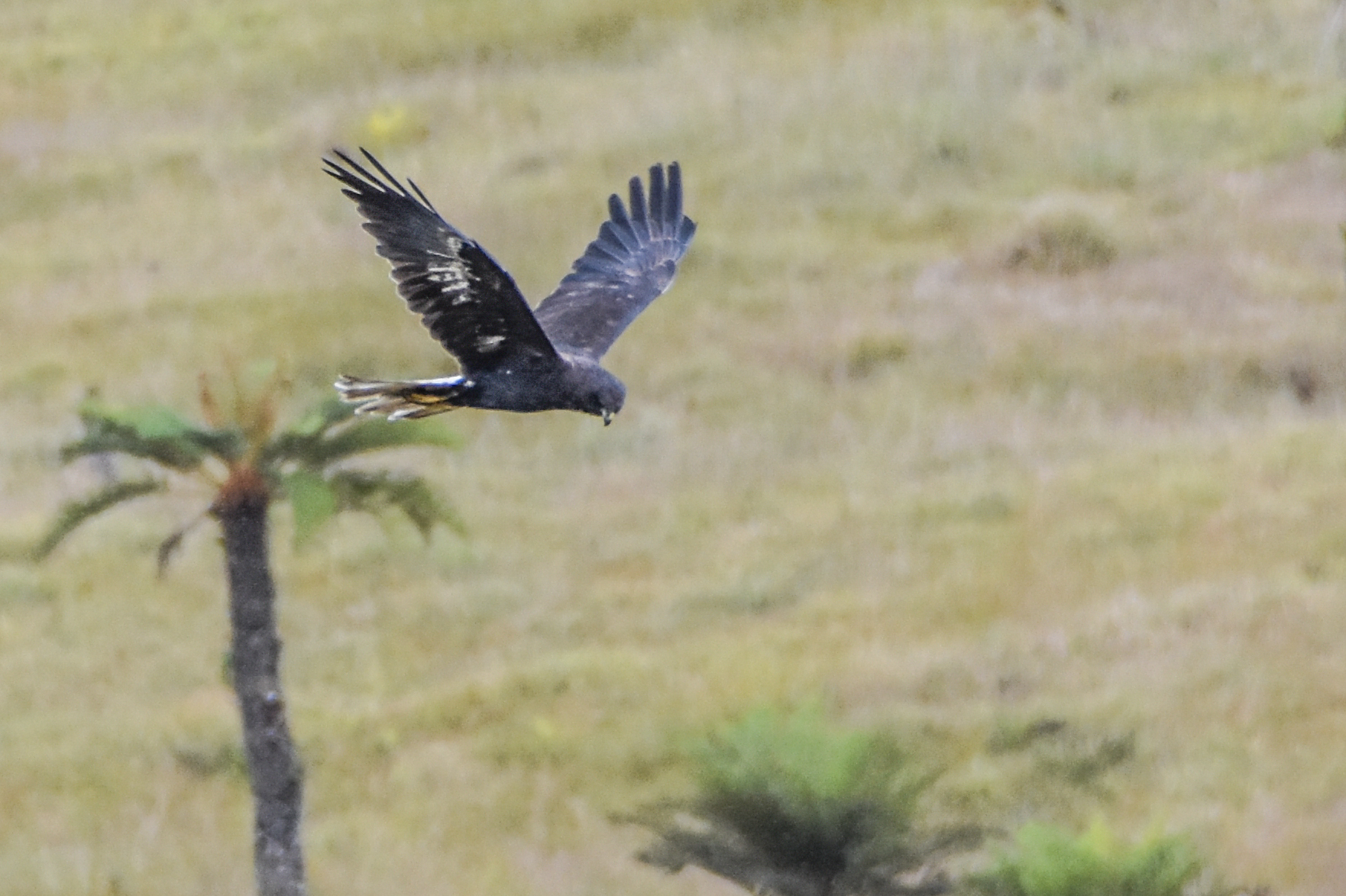

Conservation status
- Least Concern (IUCN 3.1)

Scientific classification
- Kingdom: Animalia
- Phylum: Chordata
- Class: Aves
- Order: Accipitriformes
- Family: Accipitridae
- Genus: Circus
- Species: C. spilothorax

Binomial name
- Circus spilothorax Salvadori & D'Albertis, 1875
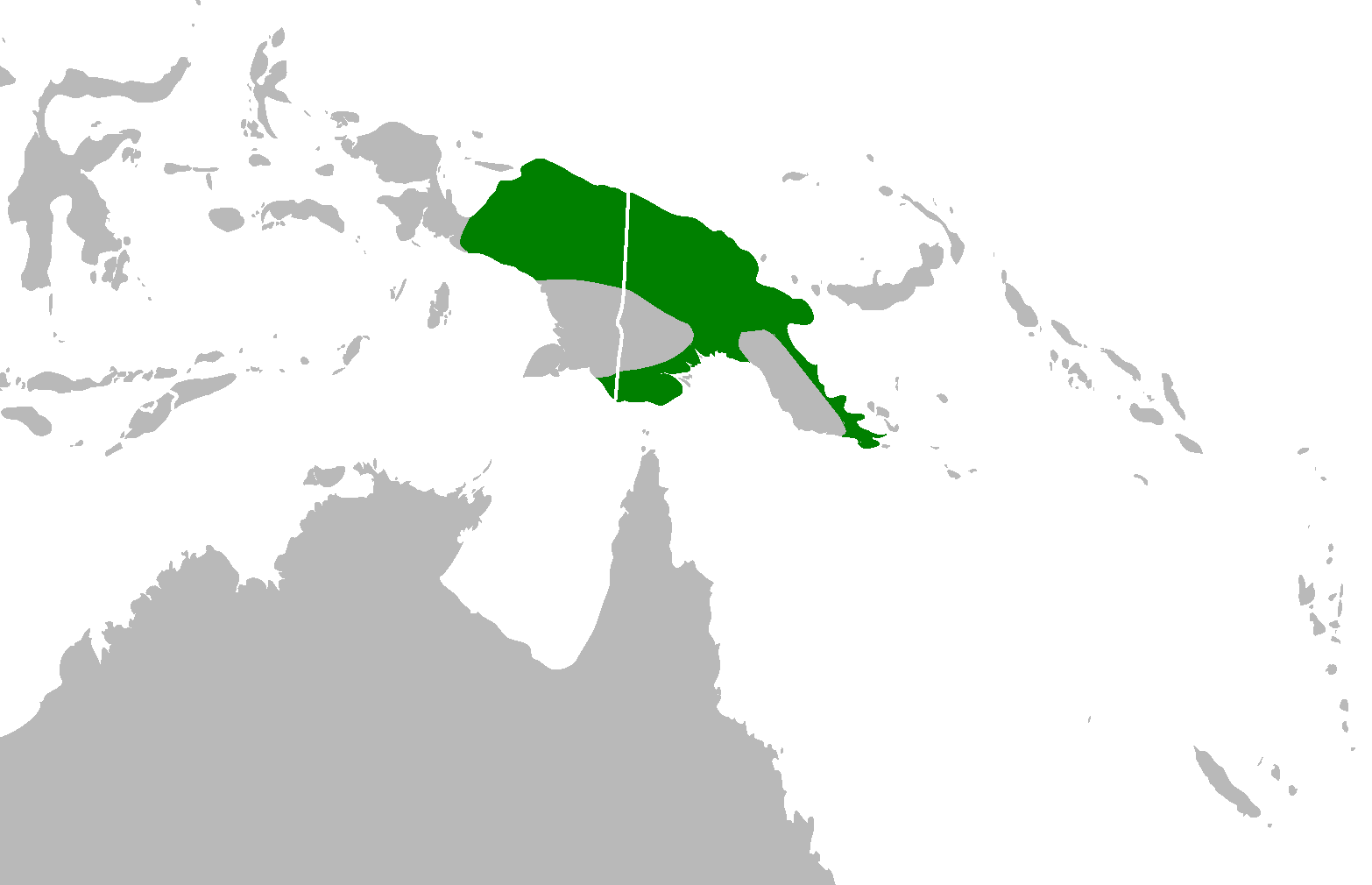

= Papuan harrier =

Species of bird

The Papuan harrier (Circus spilothorax) is a bird of prey native to New Guinea which belongs to the harrier genus Circus. It was classified as a subspecies of the eastern marsh harrier (Circus spilonotus) of eastern Asia.

It is thinly scattered across the whole of New Guinea except for the Vogelkop peninsula in the west. There are several unconfirmed reports from Australia but the bird can easily be confused with the swamp harrier. It inhabits grassland and wetlands up to 3800 m above sea-level. It hunts low over open ground searching for small mammals, birds and lizards.

The adult male is usually silvery-grey with black head, throat, back and wing-markings and white underparts. Adult females are brown with a pale rump, barred tail and streaked underparts. Juveniles are blackish-brown with cream-coloured markings on the head, more extensive in the female. The length of the bird varies from 47 to 54 cm; females are larger than the males.

In the central highlands and the Sepik valley there is a dark morph; males of this form are mostly blackish with a grey tail and the females are mostly dark brown.
