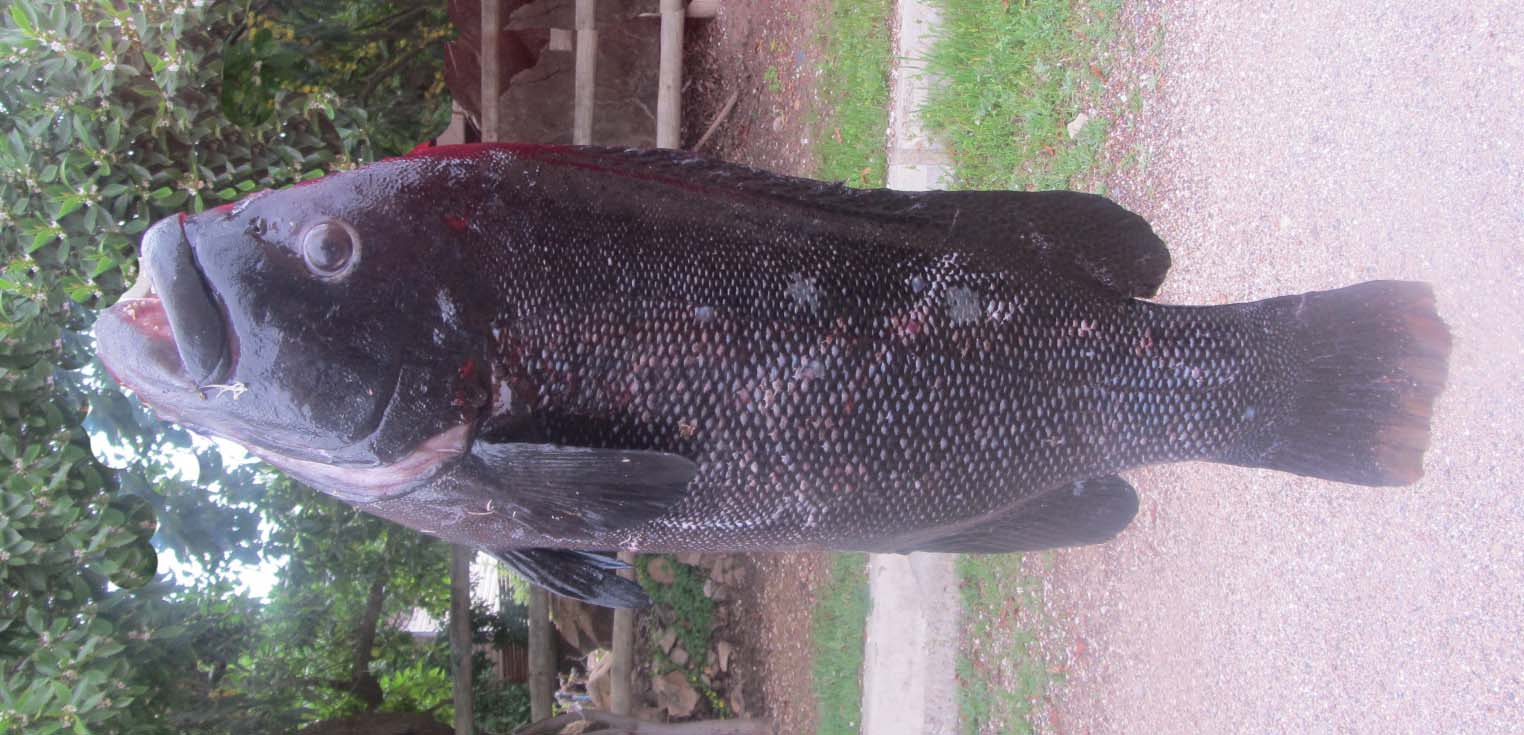
- Graus nigra

Scientific classification
- Domain: Eukaryota
- Kingdom: Animalia
- Phylum: Chordata
- Class: Actinopterygii
- Order: Centrarchiformes
- Family: Girellidae
- Genus: Graus; Philippi, 1887
- Species: G. nigra

Binomial name
- Graus nigra Philippi, 1887

= Graus nigra =

Species of ray-finned fish

Graus nigra is a species of ray-finned fish endemic to the Pacific coast of South America, ranging from Valdivia in Chile to southern Peru. This species grows to a total length of 64.6 cm (25.4 in) and is popular as a game fish. This species is the only known member of its genus, and is known locally as vieja negra (meaning “old black” in Spanish).

== Ecology ==
Graus nigra is found in Chile and Peru, often in forests of giant kelp. Associated with it in this habitat are the Chilean abalone (Concholepas concholepas), keyhole limpets (Fissurella spp.), the Chilean sea urchin Loxechinus albus, and the labrid fish Galápagos sheephead (Semicossyphus darwini). Other carnivorous fish in the kelp forest include the Peruvian morwong (Cheilodactylus variegatus), the Chilean sandperch (Pinguipes chilensis) and the Cape redfish (Sebastes capensis); also present in this habitat is the herbivorous Aplodactylus punctatus. These fish are present in the dense lower storey of the kelp forest where they feed on the benthos. If for some reason the kelp is removed or thinned, the predacious fish feed in the water column instead.

== Uses ==
Graus nigra is a game fish, targeted by spear-fishers, both recreational fishermen and artisanal hunters. From around 1985 to 2005, the total tonnage caught of this species has dwindled by about 90% and the average size of fish has also shrunk. Another target species, Medialuna ancietae , once abundant, has become so rare that most younger spear-fishers have never seen one. These changes in abundance of some of the dominant carnivorous fish in the giant kelp forest has had a marked effect on the biodiversity of their habitats.
