= Blue perch =

Blue perch can refer to several species of fish:

- Blue badis (Badis badis), a chameleonfish from freshwater of Asia
- Cunner (Tautogolabrus adspersus), a wrasse from the northwestern Atlantic Ocean
- Halfmoon (Medialuna californiensis), a sea chub from the northeastern Pacific Ocean
