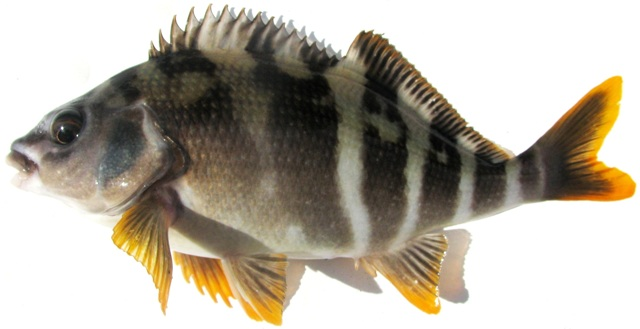

Scientific classification
- Kingdom: Animalia
- Phylum: Chordata
- Class: Actinopterygii
- Order: Centrarchiformes
- Family: Latridae
- Genus: Chirodactylus
- Species: C. variegatus

Binomial name
- Chirodactylus variegatus (Valenciennes, 1833)

Synonyms
- Chielodactylus variegatus Valenciennes, 1833; Cheilodactylus antonii Valenciennes, 1833

= Chirodactylus variegatus =

Peruvian morwong

Species of fish

Chirodactylus variegatus, the Peruvian morwong or bilagai, is a species of marine ray-finned fish traditionally regarded as belonging to the family Cheilodactylidae, the members of which are commonly known as morwongs. It is found in the southeastern Pacific Ocean off the western coast of South America.

== Taxonomy ==
Chirodactylus variegatus was first formally described in 1833 as Cheilodactylus variegatus by the French zoologist Achille Valenciennes, with the type locality given as Valparaíso in Chile. When the American ichthyologist Theodore Nicholas Gill initially described the genus Chirodactylus in 1962 he included Cheilodactylus antonii as its type species, which is considered to be a junior synonym for C. variegatus. Genetic and morphological analyses strongly support the validity of Chirodactylus as a genus, which should be placed in the family Latridae. The 5th edition of Fishes of the World, however, retains the genus within the family Cheilodactylidae.

== Description ==
Chirodactylus variegatus is a medium-sized fish with a robust, slightly compressed body, the depth of the body is one third of the total length. The body is totally covered with ctenoid scales. It has a rather small head with small eyes and a small, subterminal mouth with thick lips. The overall colour of the body is greyish, darker dorsally and shading to blackish on the flanks and the belly is pale with a reddish tint. The sides are marked with 6-7 pale vertical bands there are similar coloured spots on and around the caudal peduncle. The fins are a vivid red-orange colour. It has thick, short pectoral fins, a continuous dorsal fin and a small anal fin with two spines free of the fin membrane. The caudal fin is forked. The Peruvian morwong reaches a maximum total length of 44 cm (17 in) and weight of 1.0 kg (2.2 lb).

== Distribution ==
C. variegatus is endemic to the subtropical southeastern Pacific Ocean, within the area bounded by 5°S to 37°S, and 81°W to 71°W . Its range extends southwards along the coast of South America, from Paita in Peru to Talcahuano in Chile.

== Ecology ==
C. variegatus occurs in small schools within kelp forests (Macrocystis integrifolia) which grow on rocks in the shallow subtidal zone and the lower intertidal zone on the coast of Chile.

In a survey of the inhabitants of these kelp forests, there was found to be a wide diversity of molluscs and crustaceans, with the sea urchin Tetrapygus niger and the gastropod Tegula tridentata being dominant. The most common fish was the herbivorous Aplodactylus punctatus. The main carnivorous fish were the Peruvian morwong, the Chilean sandperch (Pinguipes chilensis), the Cape redfish (Sebastes capensis) and the sea chub (Graus nigra).

== Uses ==
The Chinchorro culture which inhabited the arid coast of Chile some 3500 years BP built their culture around fishing, and had sophisticated fishing equipment. Their middens show abundant remains of C. variegatus, along with those of the clingfish Sicyases sanguineus, the Chilean sheepshead wrasse Semicossyphus darwini, and Labrisomids.
