= Microcotyle nemadactylus =

Scientific classification
- Kingdom: Animalia
- Phylum: Platyhelminthes
- Class: Monogenea
- Order: Mazocraeidea
- Family: Microcotylidae
- Genus: Microcotyle
- Species: M. nemadactylus

Binomial name
- Microcotyle nemadactylus Dillon & Hargis, 1965

Synonyms
- Paramicrocotyle nemadactylus (Dillon & Hargis, 1965) Caballero & Bravo-Hollis, 1972

Species of worm

Microcotyle nemadactylus is a species of monogenean, parasitic on the gills of a marine fish. It belongs to the family Microcotylidae.

== Taxonomy ==
Microcotyle nemadactylus was first described and redescribed by Dillon & Hargis. Caballero y Caballero and Bravo-Hollis erected the genus Paramicrocotyle to describe Paramicrocotyle tampicensis and Paramicrocotyle atriobursata off Mexico; they placed within this genus 16 species previously assigned to the genus Microcotyle including nemadactylus. However, Microcotyle nemadactylus was returned to the genus Microcotyle and Paramicrocotyle is considered a junior subjective synonym of Microcotyle.

== Description ==
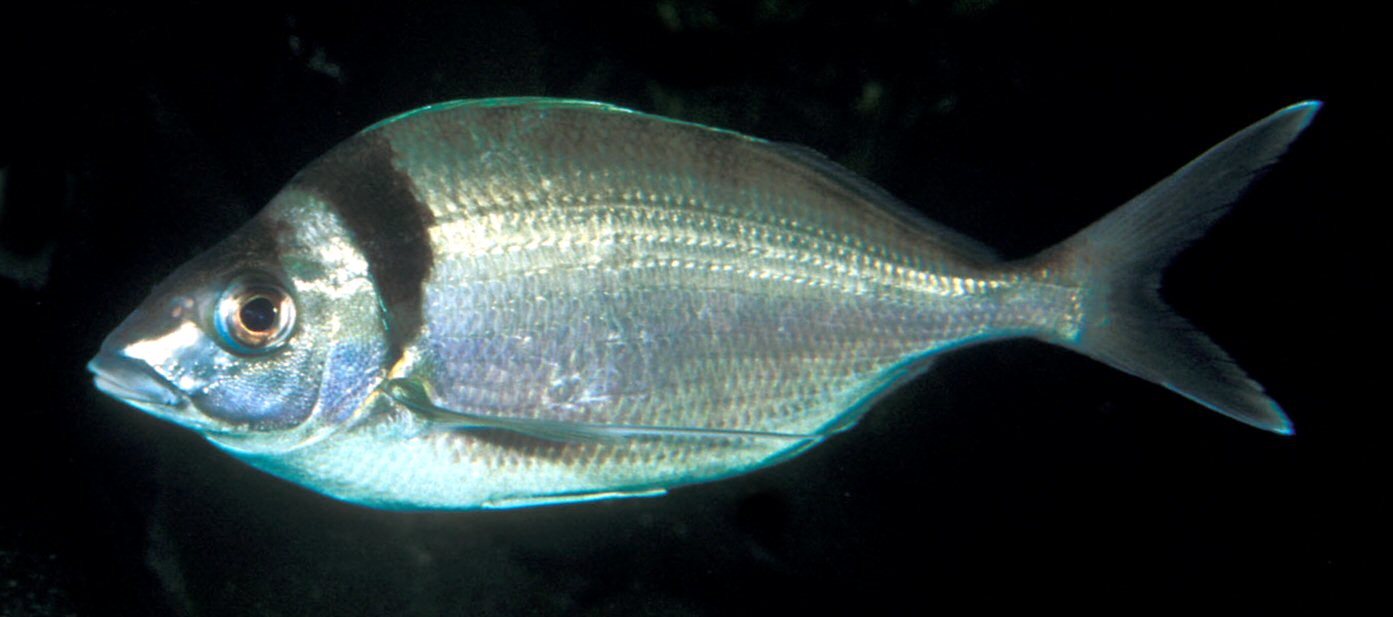
The tarakihi Nemadactylus macropterus is the type-host of Microcotyle nemadactylus

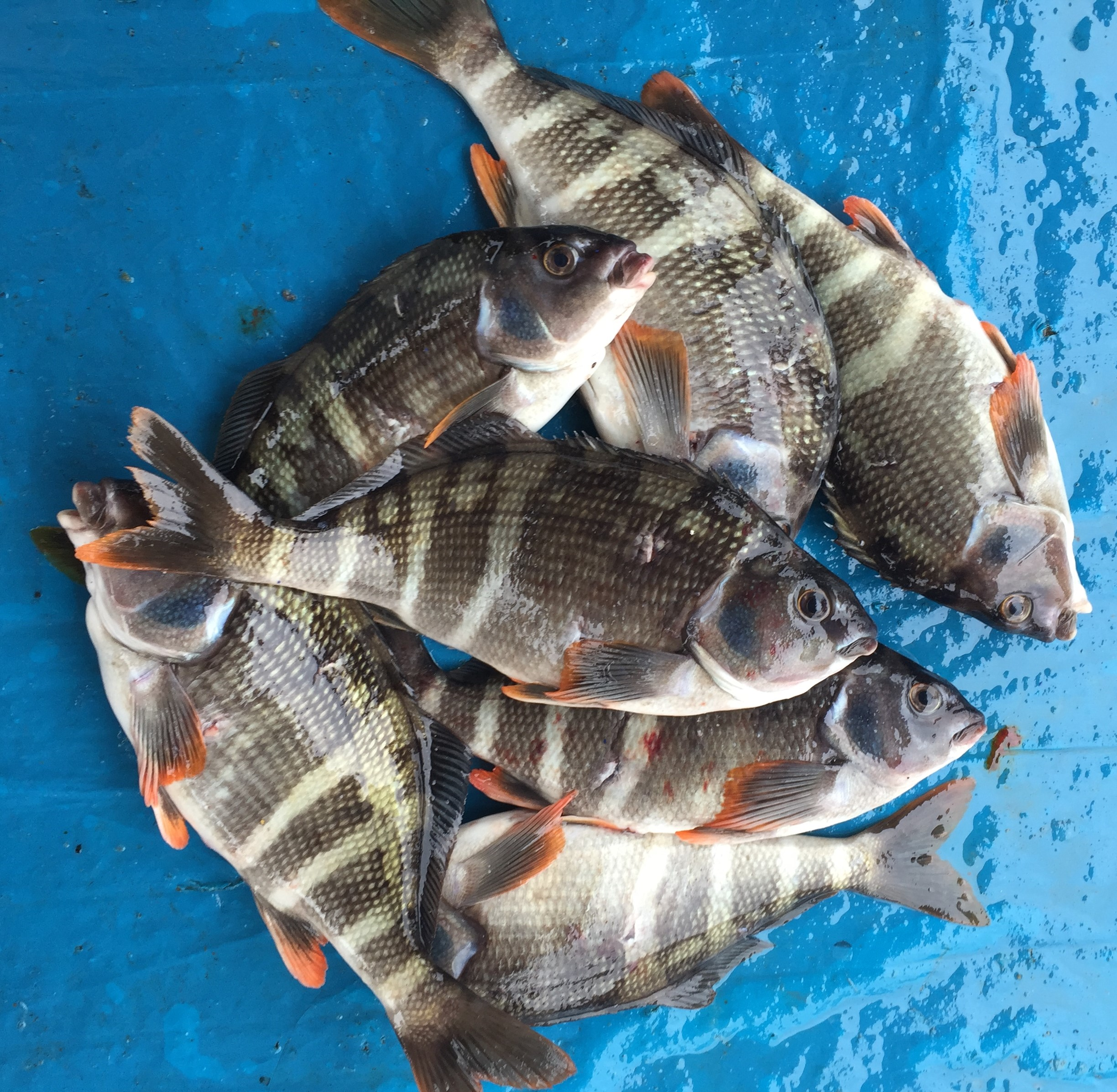
The Peruvian morwong Cheilodactylus variegatus is also host of Microcotyle nemadactylus

Microcotyle nemadactylus has the general morphology of all species of Microcotyle, with a flat elongated fusiform body comprising an anterior part which contains most organs and a posterior part called the haptor. The haptor is symmetrical and weakly delineated from body proper, bears 94–102 clamps similar in shape and dissimilar in size, arranged as two rows, one on each side. The clamps of the haptor attach the animal to the gill of the fish. There are also two small buccal suckers located at the anterior extremity, and with a rim armed with small, sclerotized, toothlike papillae. The digestive organs include an anterior, terminal mouth, a fairly short esophagus, extending to the posterior margin of the genital atrium, a muscular pharynx, and a posterior intestine with two lateral blind-ending branches. Each adult contains male and female reproductive organs. The reproductive organs include an anterior genital atrium consisting of an outer muscular rim of radiating fibers and an inner portion armed with numerous spines, with spines, a dorsal vagina, a single tubular folded ovary, and 16–25 follicular testes which are posterior to the ovary. The eggs are fusiform, with filaments at both end.

== Differential diagnosis ==
Microcotyle nemadactylus resembles Microcotyle bassensis from the gills of Platycephalus bassensis off Australia. They differ in measurements and arrangement of the genital atrium and atrial spines.

== Etymology ==
The specific name of this species, nemadactylus, relates to the generic name of the type host fish, Nemadactylus macropterus.

== Hosts and localities ==
The tarakihi Nemadactylus macropterus (Cheilodactylidae) is the type-host of Microcotyle nemadactylus. The species has been first described from fish caught off New Zealand (Timaru, Canterbury and Dunedin, Otago, South Island). It has also been recorded from the type-host from Lakes Entrance, eastern Victoria, Australia and from the Peruvian morwong Cheilodactylus variegatus (Cheilodactylidae).
