= Medialuna ancietae =

Scientific classification
- Domain: Eukaryota
- Kingdom: Animalia
- Phylum: Chordata
- Class: Actinopterygii
- Order: Centrarchiformes
- Family: Kyphosidae
- Genus: Medialuna
- Species: M. ancietae

Binomial name
- Medialuna ancietae Chirichigno F., 1987

Species of fish

Medialuna ancietae is a species of sea chub native to the Pacific coast of South America where it inhabits the giant kelp forests. It is known locally as acha, mero del sur or chino.

== Description ==
Sea chubs are medium-sized fish with small heads, blunt snouts and laterally compressed bodies. The small mouth contains a row of short teeth with hockey-stick shaped tips. The dorsal fin is continuous and has 11 to 14 spines, which can be folded down into a groove, and 11 to 13 soft rays. The anal fin has three spines and 11 to 13 soft rays. The body is clad in small scales which are thick and feel rough. The colour is mainly drab, the belly being paler than the upper parts. M. ancietae can grow to a maximum weight of 15 kg (33 lb).

== Distribution and habitat ==
M. ancietae is native to the subtropical southeastern Pacific Ocean where it is found on the coasts of Peru and Chile. Its habitat is the forests of giant kelp that line the rocky shore subtidally. The dominant species of kelp along this coast are Lessonia trabeculata subtidally and Lessonia nigrescens intertidally; these can grow to a length of 2.5 m (8 ft) and provide a dense tangled environment.

== Uses ==
Medialuna ancietae is esteemed as a sport fish and is the subject of both recreational and artisanal spear-fishing. Historically, along with Graus nigra and the Chilean sheepshead (Semicossyphus darwini), M. ancietae constituted more than 98% of the fish caught by spear-fishing. However, unregulated fishing has reduced the numbers of these fish to such an extent that by 2015, M. ancietae was rarely seen; the community structure of the kelp forest has been affected by this reduction in the populations of carnivorous fishes.
