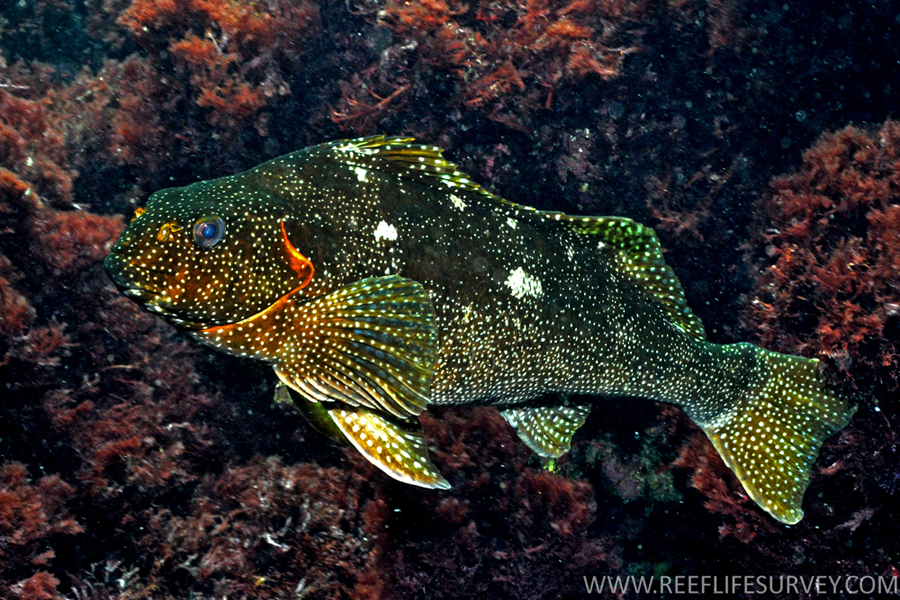
- Lord Howe Island

Scientific classification
- Kingdom: Animalia
- Phylum: Chordata
- Class: Actinopterygii
- Order: Centrarchiformes
- Family: Aplodactylidae
- Genus: Aplodactylus
- Species: A. etheridgii

Binomial name
- Aplodactylus etheridgii (J. D. Ogilby, 1889)

Synonyms
- Haplodactylus etheridgii Ogilby, 1889

= Notchheaded marblefish =

Species of fish

The notchheaded marblefish (Aplodactylus etheridgii) is a species of marine ray finned fish, one of the marblefishes belonging to the family Aplodactylidae. It is found in the southwestern Pacific Ocean.

== Taxonomy ==
The notchheaded marblefish was first formally described in 1889 as Haplodactylus etheridgii by the Northern Ireland born Australian herpetologist and ichthyologist James Douglas Ogilby with the type locality given as the Admiralty Islets off Lord Howe Island. The specific name of this fish honours the British geologist and paleontologist Robert Etheridge Jr., the leader of the expedition on which the type was collected.

== Description ==
The notchheaded marblefish has an elongate body which has a depth equivalent to roughly a quarter of its standard length. The largest individuals have a bony ridge above the eye, with the space between the eyes being concave. It has a short snout and a rounded head which has a small mouth which is slightly downturned and has fleshy lips, the upper lip projecting. The jaws have small, mostly multicuspid teeth with a few tricuspid ones too and they are set on 3-4 rows in the jaws. The outermost row has the largest teeth and there are two patches of vomerine teeth. There are two pairs of nostrils, the front pair have fleshy flap with cirri on the front and rear margins. There is a wide, flattened spine embedded in the operculum which does not reach the margin. The dorsal fin has a long base but it is nearly split in two by a deep and wide incision between the spiny and soft rayed parts. The profile of the head shows a notch to the rear of the eye. The dorsal fin contains 15-17 spines and 19-20 soft rays while the anal fin has 3 spines and 6-7 soft rays. It has large pectoral fins which may be longer than the head and the lowest 5-6 rays are unbranched and fleshy. The body is covered in small, cycloid scales which are embedded in the skin, these extend on to the cheeks and operculum and create a sheath along base of the spiny portion of the dorsal fin. The largest total length recorded is 45 cm (18 in). This species has a brown body covered in very small white spots and it has large white patches along the flanks and an orange rear edge to the operculum. It has a grey belly while the fins are brown, apart from the outer parts of the lower pectoral fin rays which are yellowish.

== Distribution and habitat ==
The notchheaded marblefish is found only around islands in the Tasman Sea in the southwestern Pacific Ocean. In Australian waters it is found off Lord Howe Island and Norfolk Island while in New Zealand it occurs at the Kermadec Islands and the northern coast of New Zealand's North Island. It is found on coastal reefs at depths between 6 and 20 m (20 and 66 ft).

== Biology ==
The notchheaded marblefish is a herbivorous species which grazes on algae.
