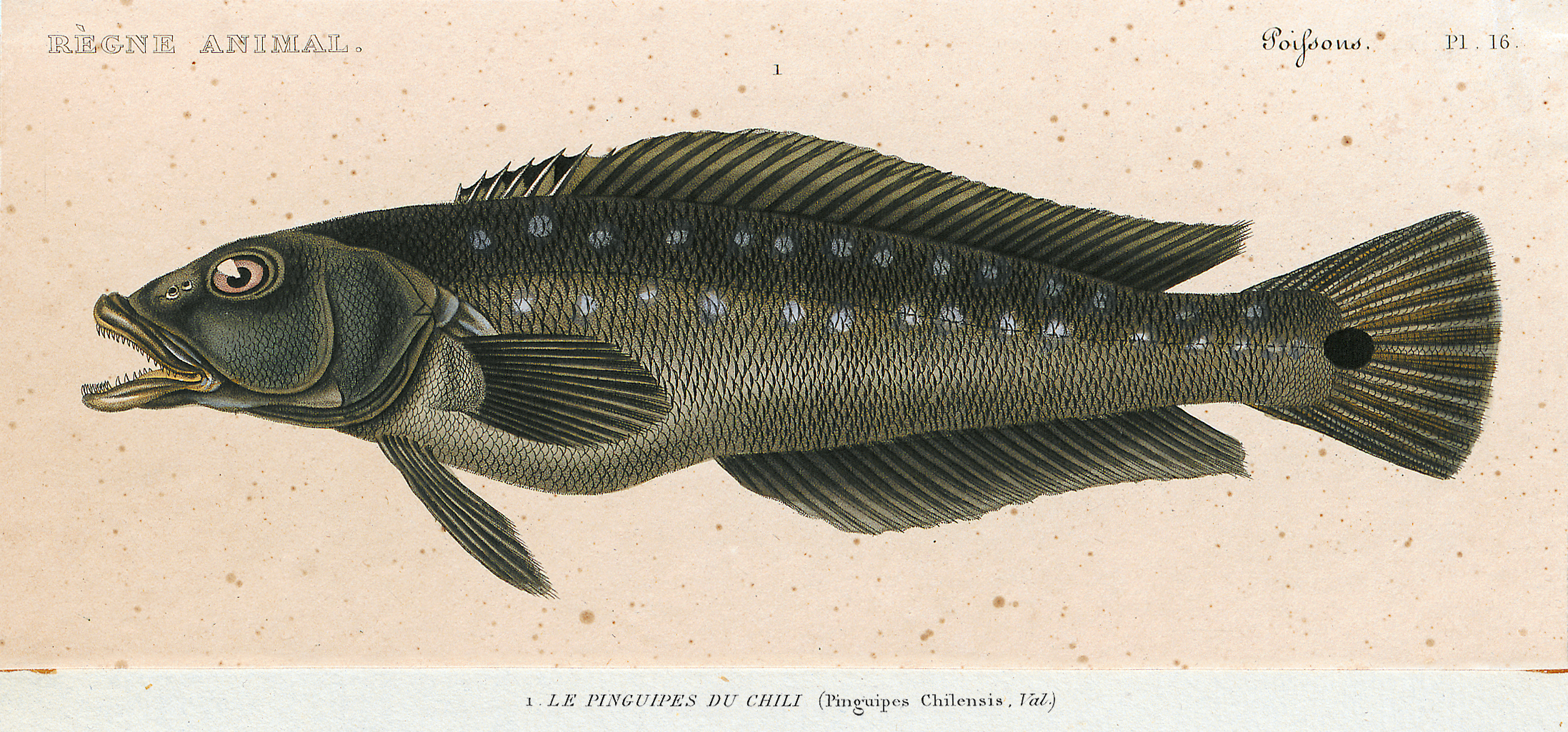
- A depiction of Pinguipes chilensis in Le Règne Animal (Georges Cuvier).

Scientific classification
- Kingdom: Animalia
- Phylum: Chordata
- Class: Actinopterygii
- Division: Teleostei
- Order: Labriformes
- Family: Pinguipedidae
- Genus: Pinguipes
- Species: P. chilensis

Binomial name
- Pinguipes chilensis Valenciennes, 1833

Synonyms
- Pseudopercis chilensis (Valenciennes, 1833)

= Pinguipes chilensis =

Species of fish

Pinguipes chilensis, commonly known as the Chilean sandperch, is a species of ray-finned fish in the family Pinguipedidae. It is found in the southeastern Pacific Ocean off the coasts of Peru and Chile.

== Description ==
P. chilensis can grow to a maximum length of 51 cm (20 in). The dorsal fin has six spines and twenty-eight soft rays, and the anal fin has a single spine and twenty-five soft rays. A specimen caught by Charles Darwin during the Beagle voyage was described as being more elongated than Pinguipes brasilianus, being about six and a half times as long as the body is deep and as having two longitudinal rows of ill-defined spots on the flanks and a larger, dark-coloured, round spot at the base of the caudal fin.

== Distribution and habitat ==
P. chilensis is found in the southeastern Pacific Ocean. Its range extends from Tumbes in northern Peru, southwards to the Magallanes Region of southern Chile. It is found on muddy bottoms as well as on rocks and sand, to depths of 100 m (330 ft). It is also present in the kelp forest alongside other carnivorous fish such as the Peruvian morwong (Cheilodactylus variegatus), vieja negra (Graus nigra) and the chancharro (Sebastes oculatus).

== Ecology ==
P. chilensis is a generalist predator, its diet consisting mainly of crustaceans, with smaller quantities of fish and polychaete worms; less often eaten are molluscs, brittle stars, sea urchins, proboscis worms, peanut worms, spoon worms and tunicates. Small fish (less than 30 cm (12 in) long) fed largely of the amphipod Ampelisca araucana while medium size fish mostly took mysids such as Neomysis sp. The largest fish (over 40 cm (16 in) long) mostly preyed on other species of fish, worms, molluscs and sea urchins. The diet also varies according to the time of year and the seasonal availability of prey species, with more fish being taken in the autumn. This fish is oviparous, with spawning taking place in the spring.
