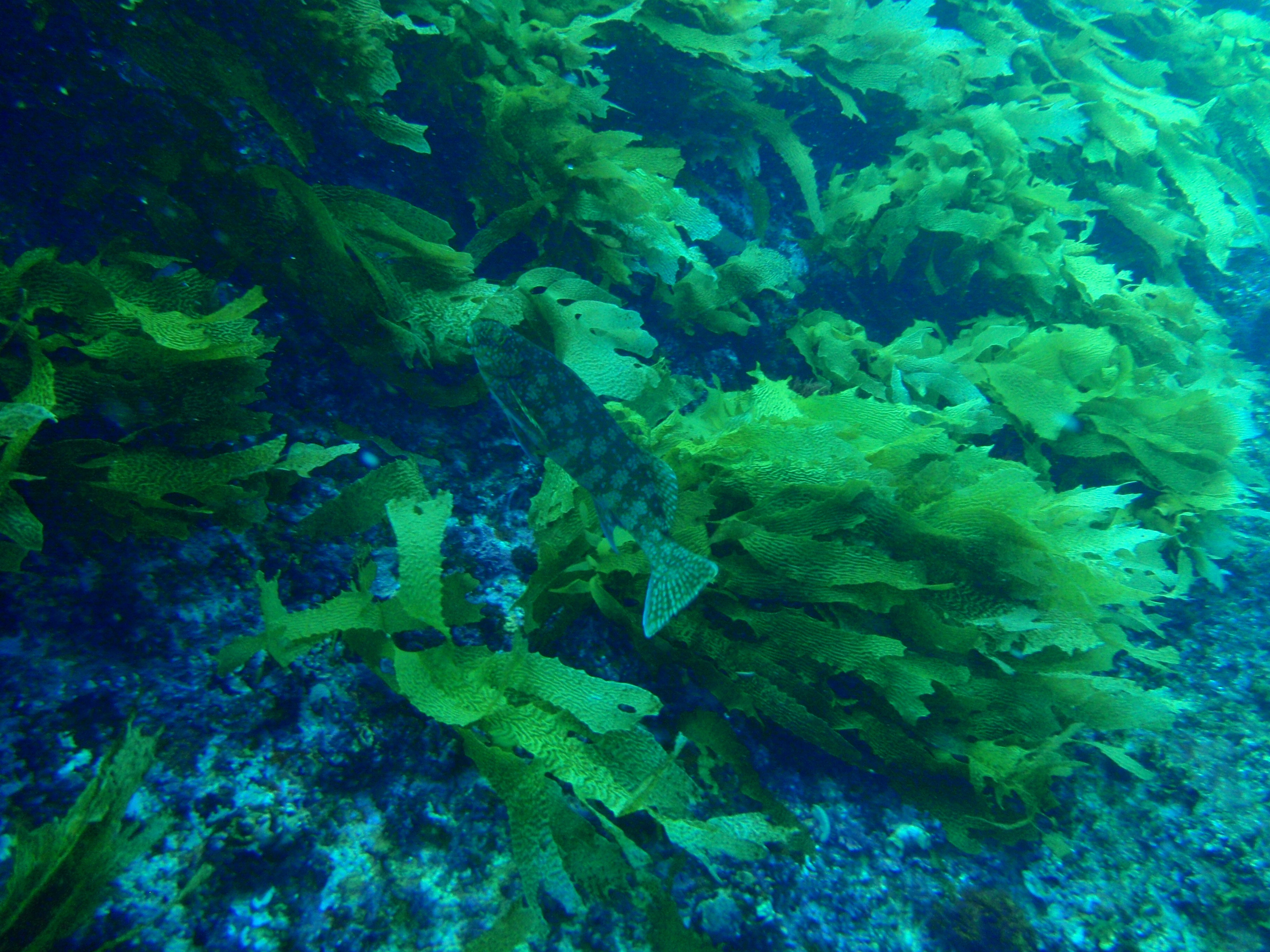

Scientific classification
- Kingdom: Animalia
- Phylum: Chordata
- Class: Actinopterygii
- Order: Centrarchiformes
- Family: Aplodactylidae
- Genus: Aplodactylus
- Species: A. westralis

Binomial name
- Aplodactylus westralis Russell, 1987

= Aplodactylus westralis =

Species of fish

Aplodactylus westralis, the western sea carp or cockatoo morwong, is a species of marine ray finned fish, one of the marblefishes belonging to the family Aplodactylidae. It is found in the eastern Indian Ocean off the coast of Western Australia.

== Taxonomy ==
Aplodactylus westralis was first formally described in 1987 by the Australian ichthyologist Barry C. Russell with the type locality given as Canal Rocks at Cape Naturaliste in Western Australia. The specific name refers to Western Australia.

== Description ==
Aplodactylus westralis has an elongate body which has a depth equivalent to between a quarter and a fifth of its standard length. It has a short snout and a rounded head which has a small mouth which is slightly downturned and has fleshy lips, the upper lip projecting. The jaws have small, The jaws have small, lanceolate teeth set on 5-6 rows in the jaws. The outermost row has the largest teeth and there is a small crescent shaped patch of vomerine teeth. There are two pairs of nostrils, the front pair have fleshy flap with small tentacles on the front and rear margins. There is a wide, flattened spine in the operculum which does not reach the margin. The dorsal fin has a long base but it is nearly split in two by a deep and wide incision between the spiny and soft rayed parts. The dorsal fin contains 17-18 spines and 18-19 soft rays while the anal fin has 3 spines and 7 soft rays. It has large pectoral fins which may be longer than the head and the lowest 5-6 rays are unbranched and fleshy. The body is covered in small, cycloid scales which are embedded in the skin, these extend on to the cheeks and operculum and create a sheath along base of the spiny portion of the dorsal fin. The largest total length recorded is 34.7 cm (13.7 in). The overall colour of this species is brown or slaty grey marked with six dark saddle blotches on the back and upper flanks, these are replaced below the lateral line by irregular bars which continue on the midline of the abdomen. Between the saddles and bars the skin is pale brown or whitish, sometimes these are very small or merge to create pale mottling, with abundant light brown or whitish spots, roughly the same width as the diameter of the pupil, mainly on the head and the caudal, dorsal and anal fins.

== Distribution and habitat ==
Aplodactylus westralis is endemic to southwestern Australia where it occurs from the Yorke Peninsula in South Australia to Rottnest Island in Western Australia. it is a common fish on rocky reefs where there are beds of seaweed at depths down to 20 m (66 ft).

== Biology ==
Aplodactylus westralis is a herbivorous fish with a diet that is dominated by brown algae.
