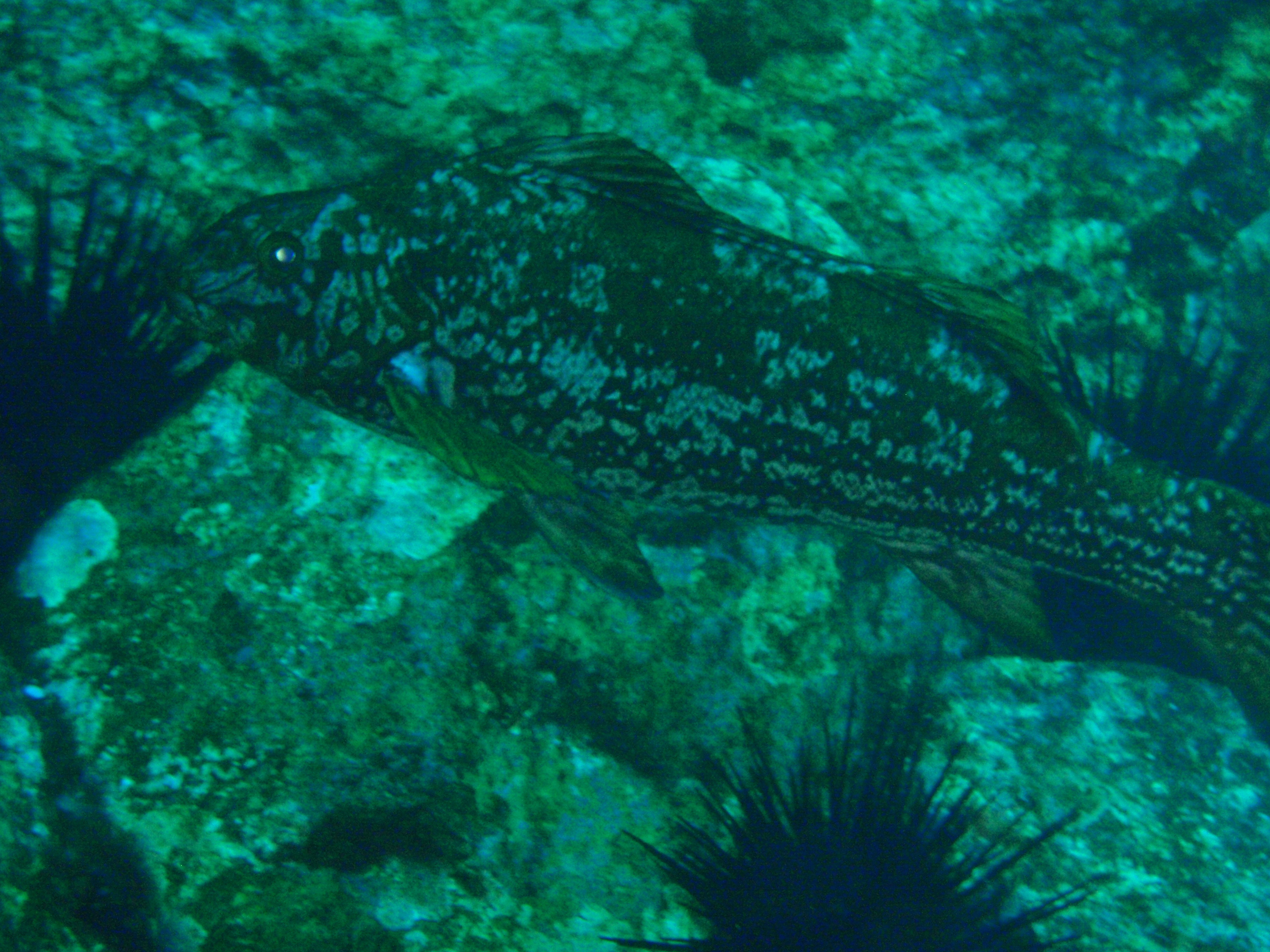

Scientific classification
- Kingdom: Animalia
- Phylum: Chordata
- Class: Actinopterygii
- Order: Centrarchiformes
- Family: Aplodactylidae
- Genus: Aplodactylus
- Species: A. arctidens

Binomial name
- Aplodactylus arctidens Richardson, 1839

Synonyms
- Dactylosargus arctidens (Richardson, 1839); Haplodactylus arctidens (Richardson, 1839); Aplodactylus meandratus Richardson, 1842; Dactylosargus meandratus (Richardson, 1842); Haplodactylus meandratus (Richardson, 1842); Sciaena maeandratus Solander, 1842; Haplodactylus donaldii Haast, 1873; Haplodactylus schauinslandii Steindachner, 1900; Aplodactylus schauinslandii (Steindachner, 1900)

= Aplodactylus arctidens =

Marblefish

Species of fish

Aplodactylus arctidens, the marblefish or southern seacarp, is a species of marine ray finned fish, one of the marblefishes belonging to the family Aplodactylidae. It is found in the southwestern Pacific Ocean.

== Taxonomy ==
Aplodactylus arctidens was first formally described in 1842 by the Scottish naval surgeon, polar explorer and naturalist Sir John Richardson with the type locality given as Port Arthur on Tasmania. The specific name arctidens is a compound of arctatus meaning "drawn close together" and dens meaning "teeth", a reference to the densely packed rows of teeth in both jaws.

== Description ==
Aplodactylus arctidens has an elongate body which is one third to one fifth as deep as its standard length. It has a short snout and a rounded head which has a small mouth which is slightly downturned and has fleshy lips, the upper lip projecting. The jaws have small, tricuspid teeth with a few sharply pointed ones too and they are set on 3-4 rows in the jaws. The outermost row has the largest teeth and there are two patches of vomerine teeth. There are two pairs of nostrils, the front pair have fleshy flap with small tentacles on the front and rear margins. There is a wide, flattened spine on the operculum which does not reach the margin. The dorsal fin has a long base but it is nearly split in two by a deep and wide incision between the spiny and soft rayed parts. The dorsal fin contains 16-19 spines and 16-18 soft rays while the anal fin has 3 spines and 6-8 soft rays. It has large pectoral fins which may be longer than the head and the lowest 5-6 rays are unbranched and fleshy. The body is covered in small, cycloid scales which are embedded in the skin, these extend on to the cheeks and operculum and create a sheath along base of the spiny portion of the dorsal fin. The largest total length recorded is 70 cm (28 in). The overall colour of the head, body and fins is olive green or brown with a large number of small whitish irregular spots, blotches and lines.

== Distribution and habitat ==
Aplodactylus arctidens is found in the southwestern Pacific Ocean. It occurs in southern Australia from immediately east of Mallacoota in Victoria east to Kangaroo Island in South Australia and in southern Tasmania. It is found throughout New Zealand from the Three Kings Islands in the north to the Snares Islands 200 km (120 mi) south of New Zealand's South Island, it is also found at the Chatham Islands. It is found on weedy reefs in shallow water at depths between 0 and 20 m (0 and 66 ft).

== Biology ==
Aplodactylus arctidens is mainly herbivorous grazing on algae, mainly red and brown algae, but it will eat any small animals it finds within the algae. It is a solitary species which defends a territory, In New Zealand spawning occurs in August and September.

== Fisheries ==
Aplodactylus arctidens is not pursued by fisheries, its flesh is not reputed to be very palatable.
