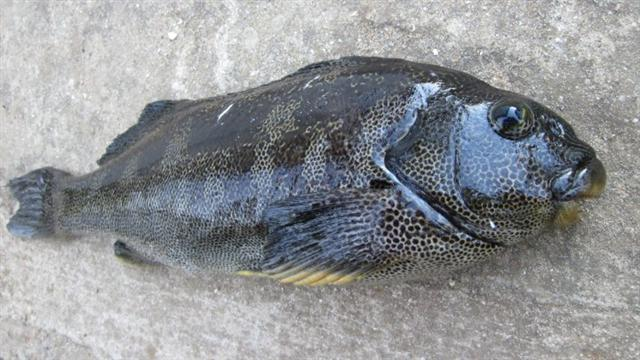
- Aplodactylus punctatus

Scientific classification
- Kingdom: Animalia
- Phylum: Chordata
- Class: Actinopterygii
- Division: Teleostei
- Order: Centrarchiformes
- Suborder: Cirrhitoidei
- Family: Aplodactylidae; Günther, 1859
- Genus: Aplodactylus; Valenciennes, 1832

Type species
- Aplodactylus punctatus Valenciennes, 1832

Synonyms
- Crinodus Gill, 1862; Dactylosargus Gill, 1862; Haplodactylus Agassiz, 1846; Parhaplodactylus Thominot, 1883

= Aplodactylus =

Genus of ray-finned fishes

Aplodactylus is a genus of marine ray-finned fishes, commonly known as marblefishes or sea carps. It is the only genus in the monogeneric family, Aplodactylidae. The fishes in this genus are found in the south eastern Indian Ocean and the southern Pacific Ocean.

== Taxonomy ==
Aplodactylus was described in 1832 by the French zoologist Achille Valenciennes with Aplodactylus punctatus, which Valenciennes described from the type specimen collected from Valparaíso in Chile, as its only species, being the type species by monotypy. The family had previously contained two genera with the monospecific Crinodon being recognised as a synonym of Aplodactylus by Barry C. Russell in 2000. The family, Aplodactylidae was created as Haplodactylidae by the German born British ichthyologist Albert Günther in 1859, the Dutch ichthyologist Pieter Bleeker corrected that to its current name later the same year. The family is regarded as part of the superfamily Cirrhitoidea, which is placed within the order Perciformes in the 5th Edition of Fishes of the World, however other authorities place this clade within a new order within the wider Percomorpha, Centrarchiformes.

The genus name is a compound of aploe meaning "single" or "simple" and daktylos meaning "finger", a reference to the unbranched lower pectoral fin rays of the type species.

== Species ==
The five currently recognized species in this genus are:

- Aplodactylus arctidens J. Richardson, 1839 (marblefish)
- Aplodactylus etheridgii (J. D. Ogilby, 1889) (notchheaded marblefish)
- Aplodactylus lophodon Günther, 1859 (rock cale)
- Aplodactylus punctatus Valenciennes, 1832 (Zamba marblefish)
- Aplodactylus westralis B. C. Russell, 1987 (western seacarp)

== Characteristics ==
Aplodactylus species are characterised by a relatively long, deep and compressed body ending in a small, blunt head. They have a small mouth, which is placed just below the short snout, with a thick upper lip. They have a long dorsal fin with a deep incision between the spiny and soft rayed portions. The anal fin is short based and triangular in shape while the pectoral fins are large and have a rounded shape, and their lower fin rays are not joined by membranes and are robust. The pelvic fins are located quite far to the rear of the base of the pectoral fins. They have small scales which are embedded in their skin and which extend onto the cheeks, as well as forming a scaly sheath at the base of the dorsal fin. The dorsal fins have 14-23 spines and 16-21 soft rays while the anal fin has 6-8 soft rays. They have vomerine teeth and the teeth in the jaws vary in shape and can be incisor-like, sharply pointed or tricuspid. They vary in size from a total length of 34.7 cm (13.7 in) in the Western seacarp to 65 cm (26 in) in the marblefish.

== Distribution and habitat ==
Aplodactylus is found in the south eastern Indian Ocean off Western Australia and in the southern Pacific Ocean off Australia, New Zealand and eastern South America. These are fishes of shallow inshore waters, typically on rocky coastlines.

== Biology ==
Apolidactylus fishes are herbivorous and feed on algae. The species may be sociable and from aggregations or they can be solitary and territorial.
