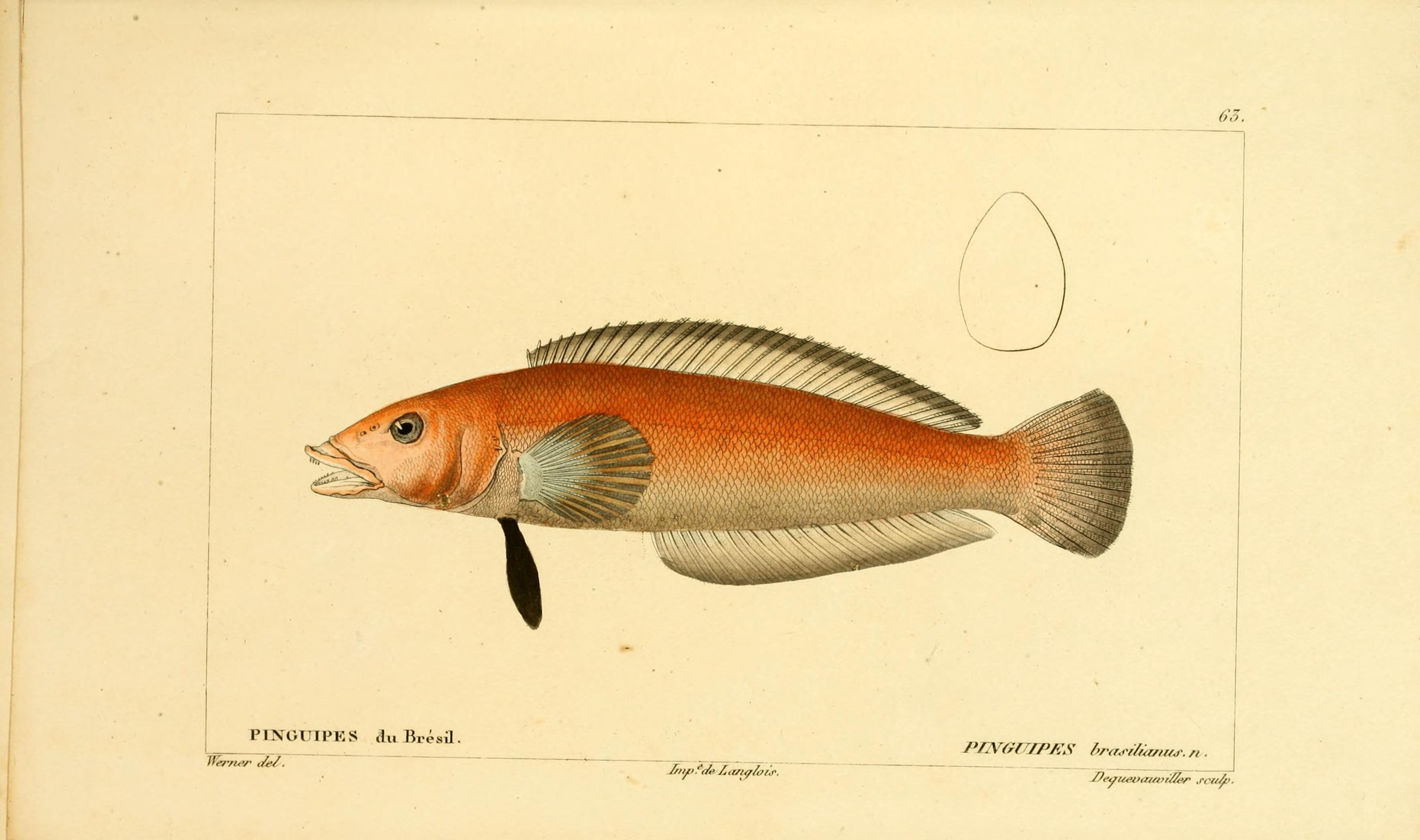
- Pinguipes brasilianus

Scientific classification
- Kingdom: Animalia
- Phylum: Chordata
- Class: Actinopterygii
- Order: Labriformes
- Family: Pinguipedidae
- Genus: Pinguipes; Cuvier, 1829

Type species
- Pinguipes brasilianus Cuvier, 1829

= Pinguipes =

Genus of ray-finned fishes

Pinguipes is a small genus of sandperches belonging to the family Pinguipedidae found in waters off South America.

== Species ==
The two species of Pinguipes are:

- Pinguipes brasilianus Cuvier, 1829 – Brazilian sandperch
- Pinguipes chilensis Valenciennes, 1833 – Chilean sandperch
