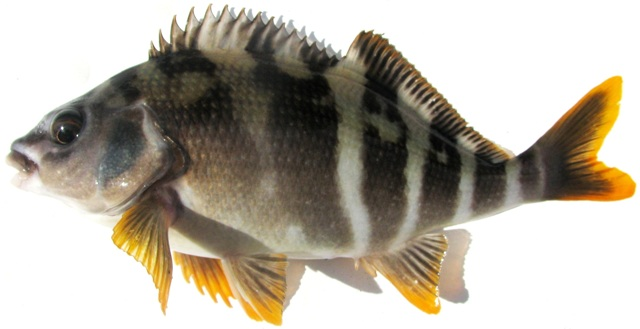
- Chirodactylus variegatus

Scientific classification
- Kingdom: Animalia
- Phylum: Chordata
- Class: Actinopterygii
- Order: Centrarchiformes
- Family: Latridae
- Genus: Chirodactylus; T. N. Gill, 1862

Type species
- Cheilodactylus antonii Valenciennes, 1833

= Chirodactylus =

Genus of fish

Chirodactylus is a genus of marine ray-finned fish, traditionally regarded as belonging to the family Cheilodactylidae, the members of which are commonly known as morwongs. They are native to the Atlantic, Indian and eastern Pacific oceans off southern Africa and South America.

== Taxonomy ==
Chirodactylus was described as a genus in 1862 by the American ichthyologist Theodore Nicholas Gill with the South American Cheilodactylus antonii, which had been described by Achille Valenciennes in 1833, as the type species by monotypy. Gill subsequently included two other species in Chirodactylus, C. grandis and C, variegatus. C. antonii was later shown to be a synonym of Cheilodactylus variegatus. Chirodactylus was largely regarded as a synonym of Cheilodactylus until 1980 when the South African ichthyologist Margaret M. Smith resurrected it to include the three southern African species C. brachydactylus, C. grandis and C. jessicalenorum, as well as C. variegatus. Genetic and morphological analyses strongly suggest that Chirodactylus is a valid genus, that the inclusion of the red moki (Cheilodactylus spectabilis) does not affect its monophyly and that the genus should be placed in the family Latridae. The 5th edition of Fishes of the World, however, retains the genus within the family Cheiloactylidae.

The name of the genus is a compound of cheiros which means "hand" and dactylus meaning "finger", a reference to the long, unbranched lower rays of the pectoral fins.

== Species ==
There are currently five recognized species in this genus, though only four sensu Smith, 1980):

- Chirodactylus brachydactylus (G. Cuvier, 1830) (Two-tone fingerfin)
- Chirodactylus grandis (Günther, 1860) (Bank steenbras)
- Chirodactylus jessicalenorum M. M. Smith, 1980 (Natal fingerfin)
- Chirodactylus spectabilis (Hutton, 1872) (Red moki)
- Chirodactylus variegatus (Valenciennes, 1833) (Peruvian morwong)

== Characteristics ==
Chirodactylus morwongs are characterised by having an ovoid, compressed body and a slightly sloped dorsal profile of the head. The continuous dorsal fin increases in height from the front spine to the sixth spine and after that the spines get shorter, there are 17-18 spines and 22-31 soft rays in the dorsal fin, while the anal fin has 3 spines and 7-10 soft rays. The pectoral fins have 14 rays with the lower 6–7 rays being simple and robust. They have 46-56 scales along the lateral line. There are no bony protuberances on the head. These fishes vary in maximum total length from 40 cm (16 in) in the case of C. brachydactylus to 180 cm (71 in) for C. grandis.

== Distribution, habitat and biology ==
Chirodactylus (sensu Smith, 1980) morwongs are found in the south eastern Atlantic and southwestern Indian Ocean off southern Africa and the eastern Pacific Ocean off Peru and Chile. They are typically coastal fishes of rocky areas where they feed on benthic invertebrates.
