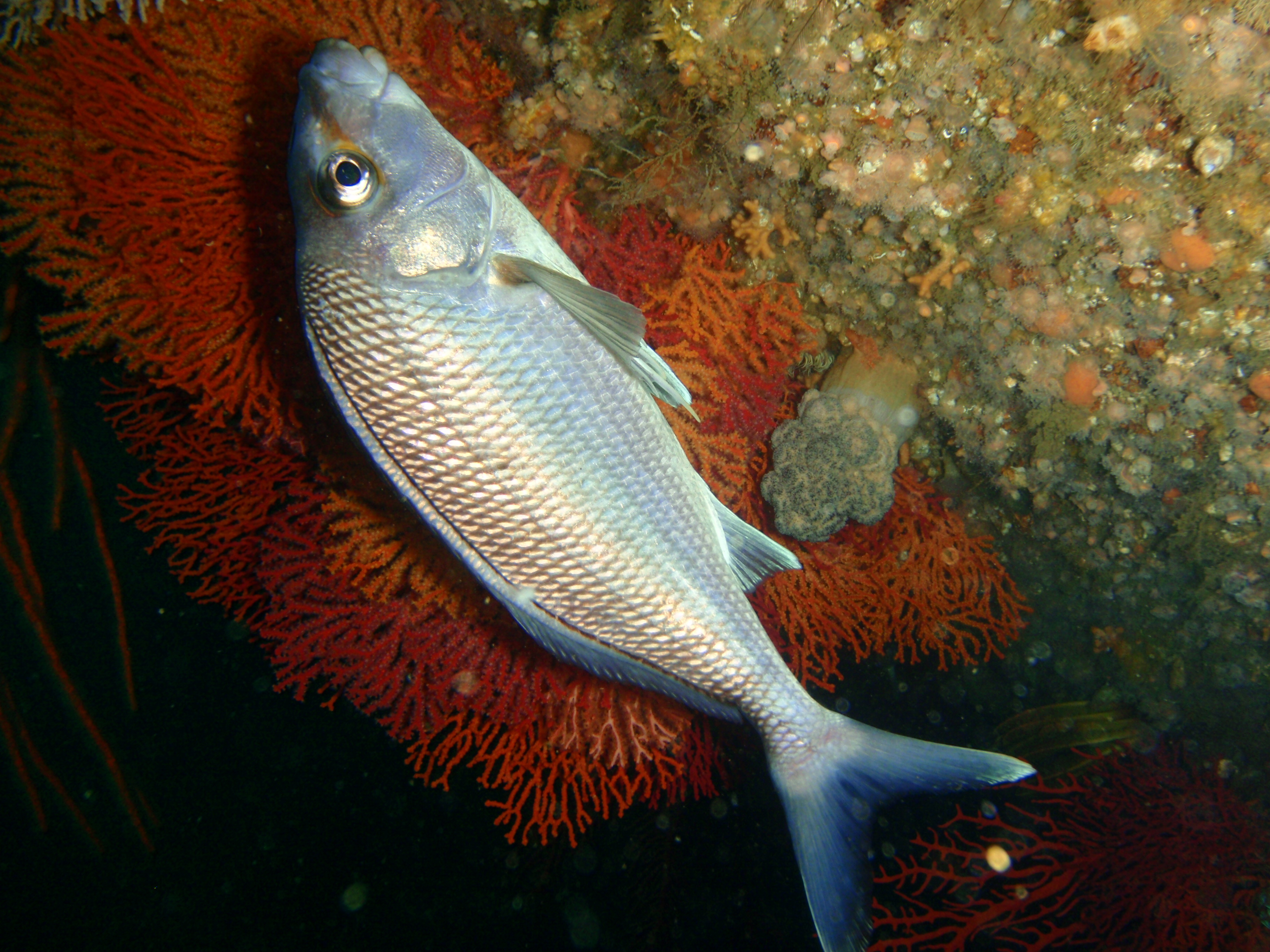

Scientific classification
- Kingdom: Animalia
- Phylum: Chordata
- Class: Actinopterygii
- Division: Teleostei
- Order: Centrarchiformes
- Family: Latridae
- Genus: Chirodactylus
- Species: C. grandis

Binomial name
- Chirodactylus grandis (Günther, 1860)

= Chirodactylus grandis =

Species of marine ray-finned fish from southern Africa

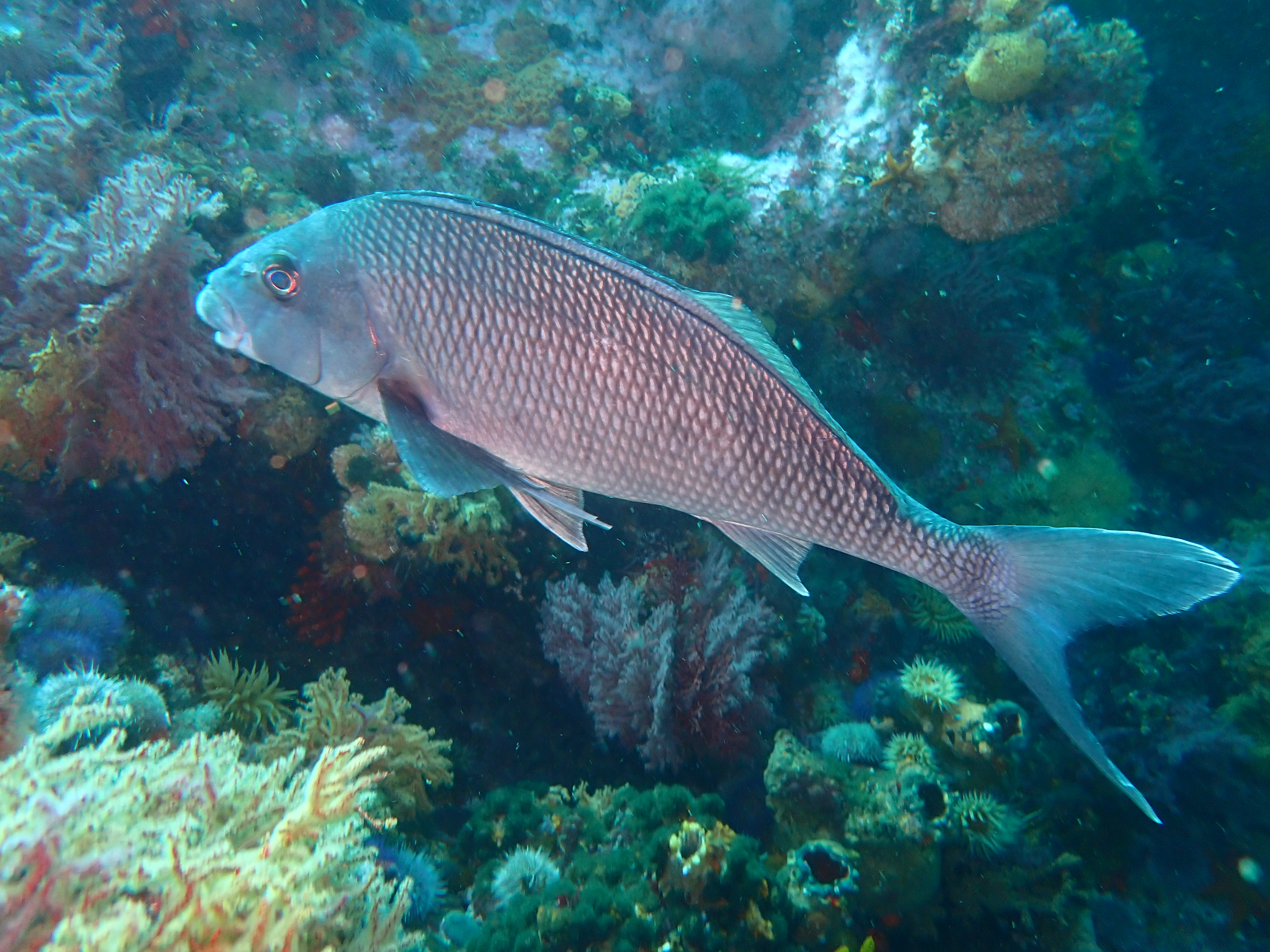
Bank steenbras at Castor Rock north pinnacle

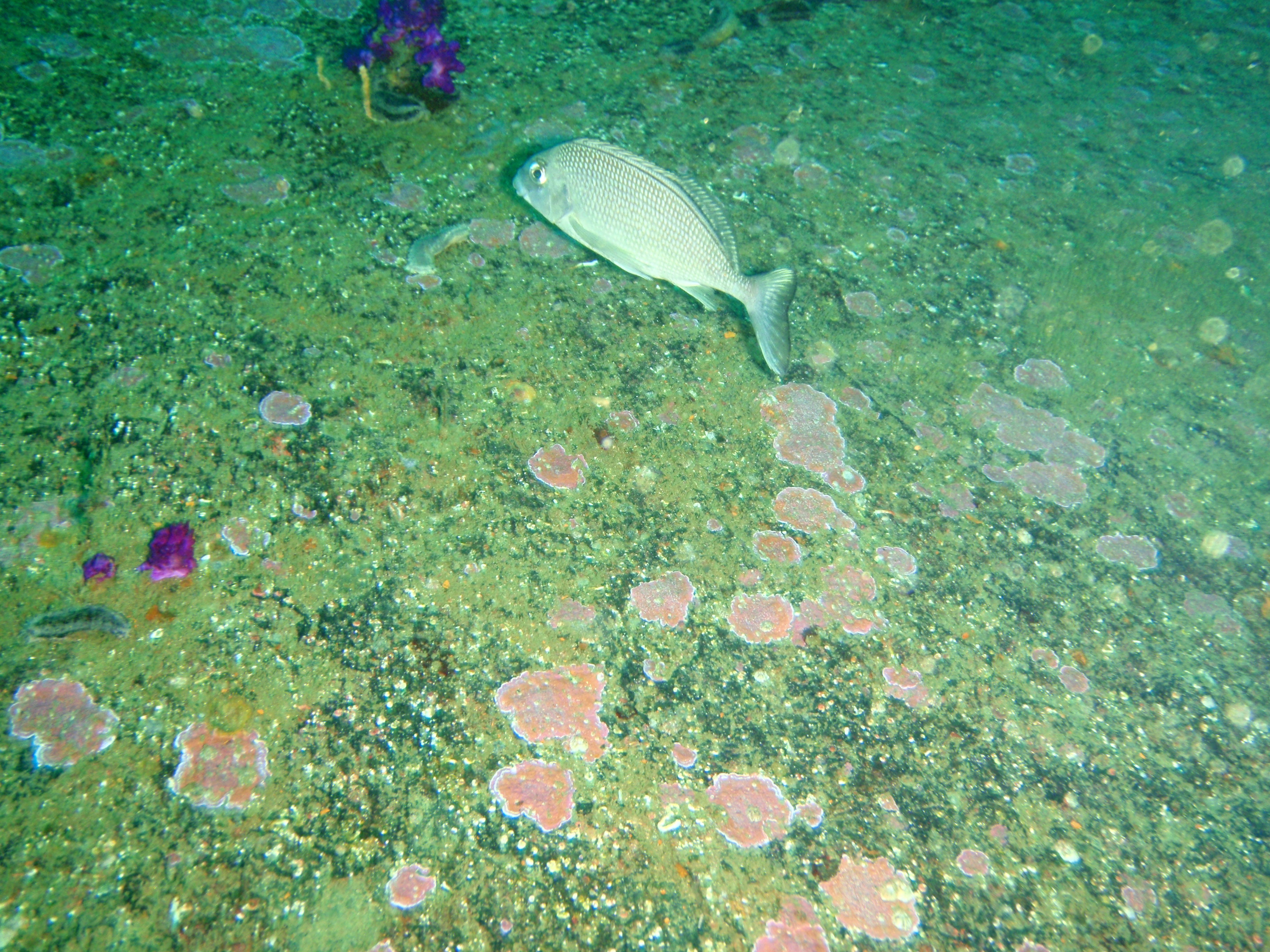
Juvenile bank steenbras on the wreck of MFV Princess Elizabeth in False Bay

Chirodactylus grandis, the Bank steenbras, is a species of marine fish in the fingerfin or morwong family (family Latridae) of order Perciformes. It is native to the coasts of South Africa. and Namibia

== Distribution ==
A marine demersal fish found from Walvis Bay to Port St. Johns, endemic to southern Africa. Subtropical eastern Atlantic and western Indian oceans between 23°S and 36°S.

== Description ==
Body is a pale grey, slightly countershaded, with darker head and fins, and usually a red stripe in front of the eye. It has a long sloping forehead and snout, and fleshy lips on a small mouth. The largest species of the family, with a length up to 1.8 m, but more commonly below 0.8 m.

=== Diagnostics ===
Depth 2.7 to 2.9 times in standard length. The dorsal fin has 17 to 18 spines and 22 to 24 rays. Anal fins 3 spines, 8 rays. Pectoral fins have 6 enlarged unbranched rays, some of which extend conspicuously beyond the upper section of the fin.

== Habitat ==
Mostly an offshore species that is usually found on rocky reefs from 20 to 150 m, but also inshore and on muddy banks. Feeds during the day on small benthic invertebrates, mainly crustaceans and polychaetes, but sometimes also on small fish and squid.

== Importance to humans ==
Considered a good eating fish, caught by trawl and line from skiboats, and by spearfishing.

== Conservation status ==
Not evaluated for IUCN.
