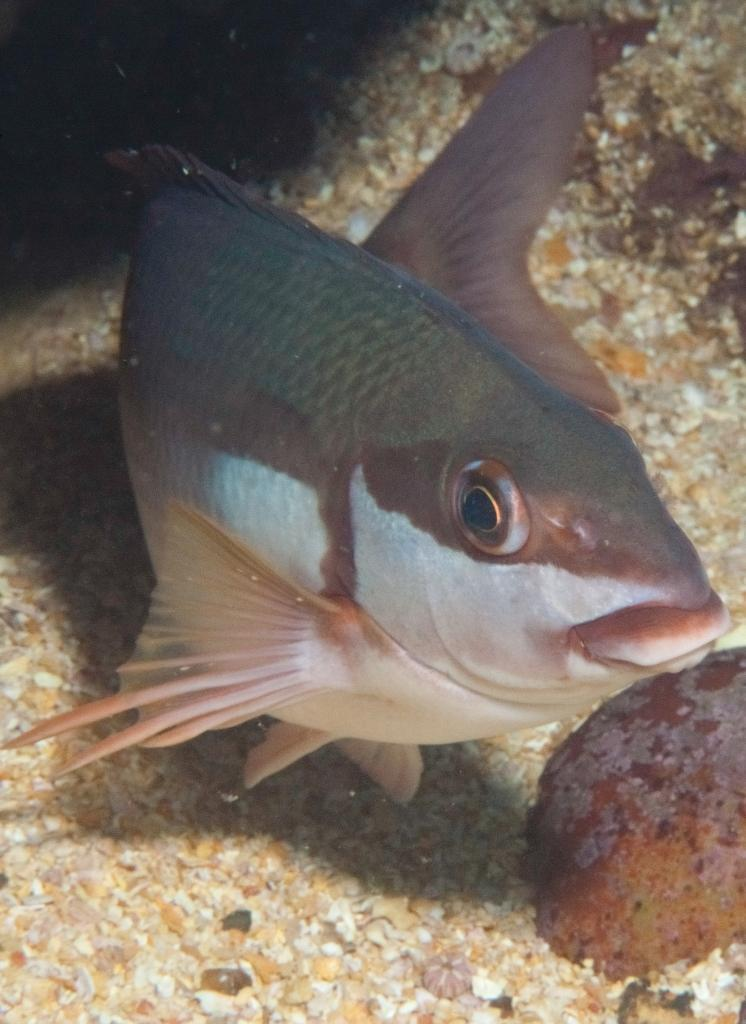

Scientific classification
- Kingdom: Animalia
- Phylum: Chordata
- Class: Actinopterygii
- Order: Centrarchiformes
- Family: Latridae
- Genus: Chirodactylus
- Species: C. brachydactylus

Binomial name
- Chirodactylus brachydactylus (Cuvier, 1830)

= Chirodactylus brachydactylus =

Marine fish native to southern Africa

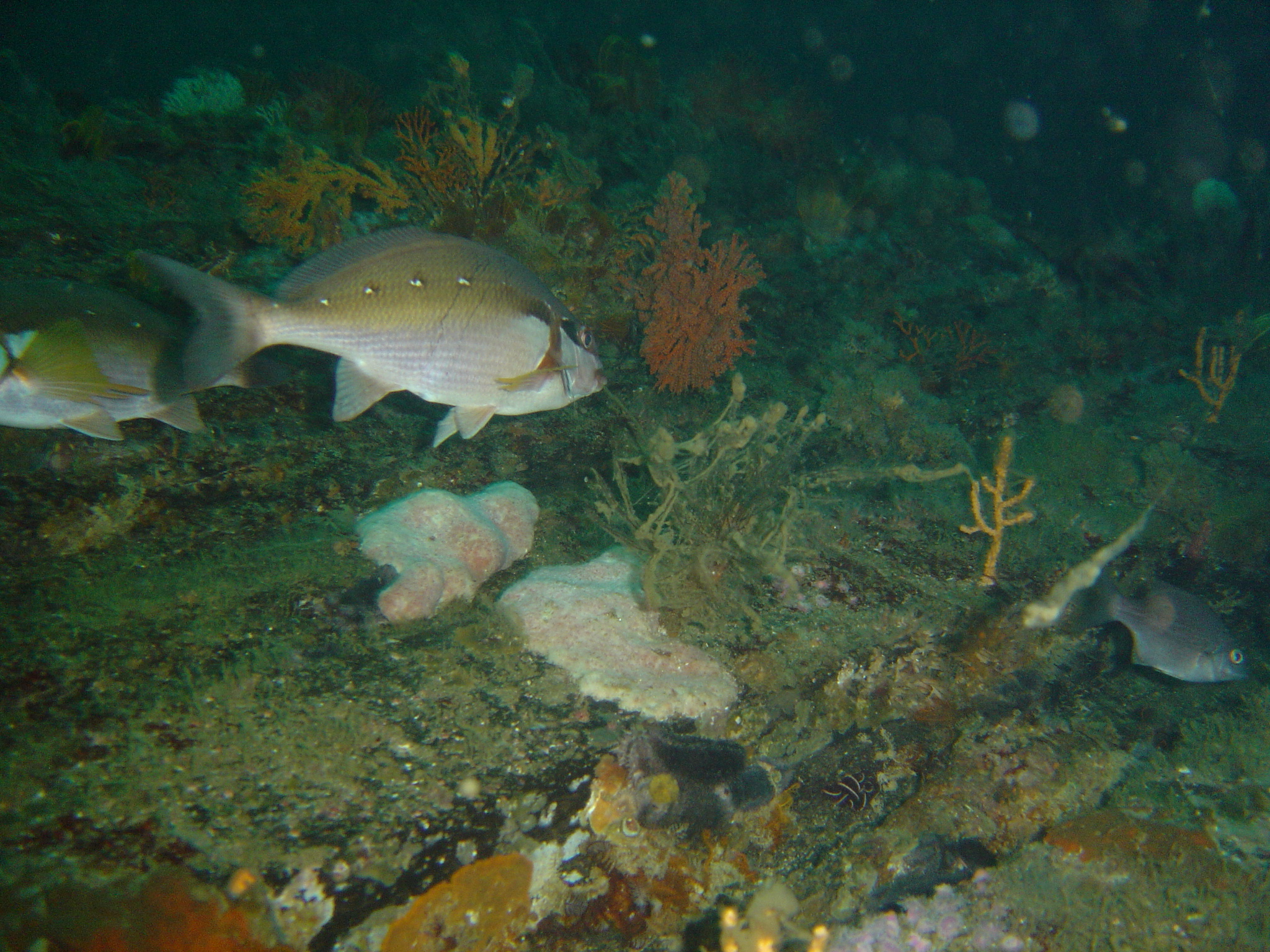
Twotone fingerfin on MV Orotava wreck in False Bay

Chirodactylus brachydactylus, the twotone fingerfin, is a species of marine fish in the fingerfin (morwongs) family (family Cheilodactylidae) of order Perciformes. It is native to the coast of southern Africa.

== Distribution ==
Along the coast of southern Africa from Walvis Bay to Maputo. Subtropical, between 23°S and 36°S in eastern Atlantic and western Indian oceans.

== Description ==
Body colour basically brown, paler on ventral side, with a brighter white area below the eyes in the front part of the body, and a row of five white spots along the lateral line. Juveniles are silvery with orange anal and paired fins. Colour changes to adult colouration from about 5 cm. The fish has fleshy lips around a small mouth. Length up to 40 cm, weight up to 3 kg. Matures at 25 cm, and spawns in summer.

== Habitat and ecology ==
Rocky reefs and sandy areas near reefs at depths to 240 m. Juveniles may be found in rock pools. C. brachydactylus is a small-benthic-invertebrate predator, There is some dietary overlap between the species assembages of the reef predators, in which this fish occurs, but each appears to have a dietary niche which reduces interspecific competition for food. Its diet includes crabs, anphipods, bivalves and other invertebrates. C. brachydactylis is preyed upon by large reef predators, including the santer seabream, (Cheimerius nufar), red steenbras (Petrus rupestris), scotsman (Polysteganus praeorbitalis), and yellowbelly rockcod (Epinephelus marginatus).

== Importance to humans ==
Does not often take a hook, but relatively easily caught spearfishing.

== Conservation status ==
Not evaluated.
