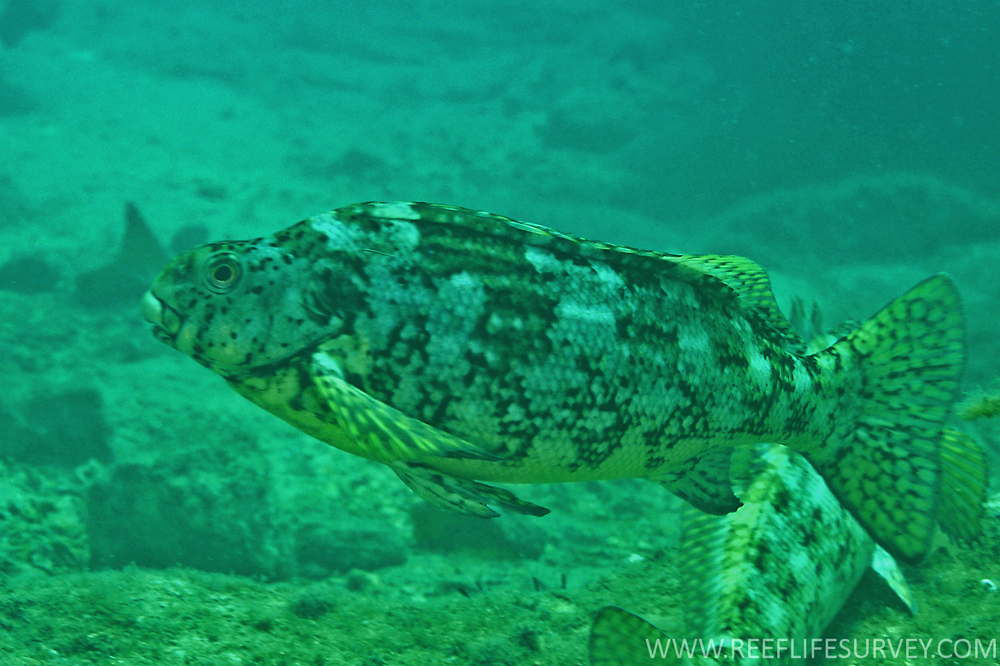
- Sydney, New South Wales

Scientific classification
- Kingdom: Animalia
- Phylum: Chordata
- Class: Actinopterygii
- Division: Teleostei
- Order: Centrarchiformes
- Family: Aplodactylidae
- Genus: Aplodactylus
- Species: A. lophodon

Binomial name
- Aplodactylus lophodon Günther, 1859

Synonyms
- Crinodus lophodon (Günther, 1859); Aplodactylus obscurus Castelnau, 1879

= Rock cale =

Species of fish

The rock cale (Aplodactylus lophodon), also known as the cockatoo fish, cocky, joey, rock cocky or sea carp, is a species of marine ray finned fish, one of the marblefishes belonging to the family Aplodactylidae. It is found in the southwestern Pacific Ocean.

== Taxonomy ==
The rock cale was first formally described in 1859 by the German born British herpetologist and ichthyologist Albert Günther, although he misspelt the genus name as Haplodactylus, with the type locality given as New South Wales. For some time some workers considered that this species was in its own monospecific genus Crinodus but in 2000 Barry C. Russell of the Museum and Art Gallery of the Northern Territory reviewed the family Apodactylidae and returned this species to the genus Aplodactylus. The specific name lophodon is a compound of lophos which means "tuft" and odon meaning "tooth", a reference to the terminal lobe and two lateral lobes on each side of its incisor like teeth.

== Description ==
The rock cale has an elongate body which has a depth equivalent to roughly a third to a quarter of its standard length. It has a short snout and a rounded head which has a small mouth which is slightly downturned and has fleshy lips, the upper lip projecting. The jaws have small, The jaws have small, tricuspid teeth with a few sharply pointed ones too and they are set on 3-4 rows in the jaws. The outermost row has the largest teeth and there are no vomerine teeth. There are two pairs of nostrils, the front pair have fleshy flap with small tentacles on the front and rear margins. There is a wide, flattened spine in the operculum which does not reach the margin. The dorsal fin has a long base but it is nearly split in two by a deep and wide incision between the spiny and soft rayed parts. The dorsal fin contains 17 spines and 18-20 soft rays while the anal fin has 3 spines and 6-7 soft rays. It has large pectoral fins which may be longer than the head and the lowest 5-6 rays are unbranched and fleshy. The body is covered in small, cycloid scales which are embedded in the skin, these extend on to the cheeks and operculum and create a sheath along base of the spiny portion of the dorsal fin. The largest total length recorded is 45 cm (18 in). The overall colour of the rock cale varies from grey to bluish-black, broken by whitish mottles on the flanks and whitish spots on the fins. There is a dark saddle blotch underneath the middle of spiny part of the dorsal fin, and a line of five uniformly spaced white blotches on the flanks below the lateral line, starting above the pectoral fin and ending under the rear end of the dorsal fin. The juveniles have an obvious black mark on upper rear edge of operculum.

== Distribution and habitat ==
The rock cale is endemic to the southeastern Australian waters of the southwestern Pacific Ocean. Here it occurs from Mudjimba on the Sunshine Coast of Queensland south to the Gippsland Lakes in Victoria, and Babel Island off Tasmania. It lives on shallow, exposed rocky shores, schooling in high-energy zone, just below the surface down to around 10 m (33 ft) where there is good cover of kelp and other seaweeds.

== Biology ==
The rock cale is herbivorous feeding on weeds and algae, such as Corallina pilulifera, as well as lesser amounts of Ulva lactuca, Jania and filamentous algae including species in the genus Sphacelaria. They will feed on both free floating and attached algae. Typically this species is observed sitting on the "turf" made up of coralline algae but when there is strong wave surges it can wedge itself into crevices in the rock. It is one of the most numerous reef fishes in the surge zone off New South Wales.
