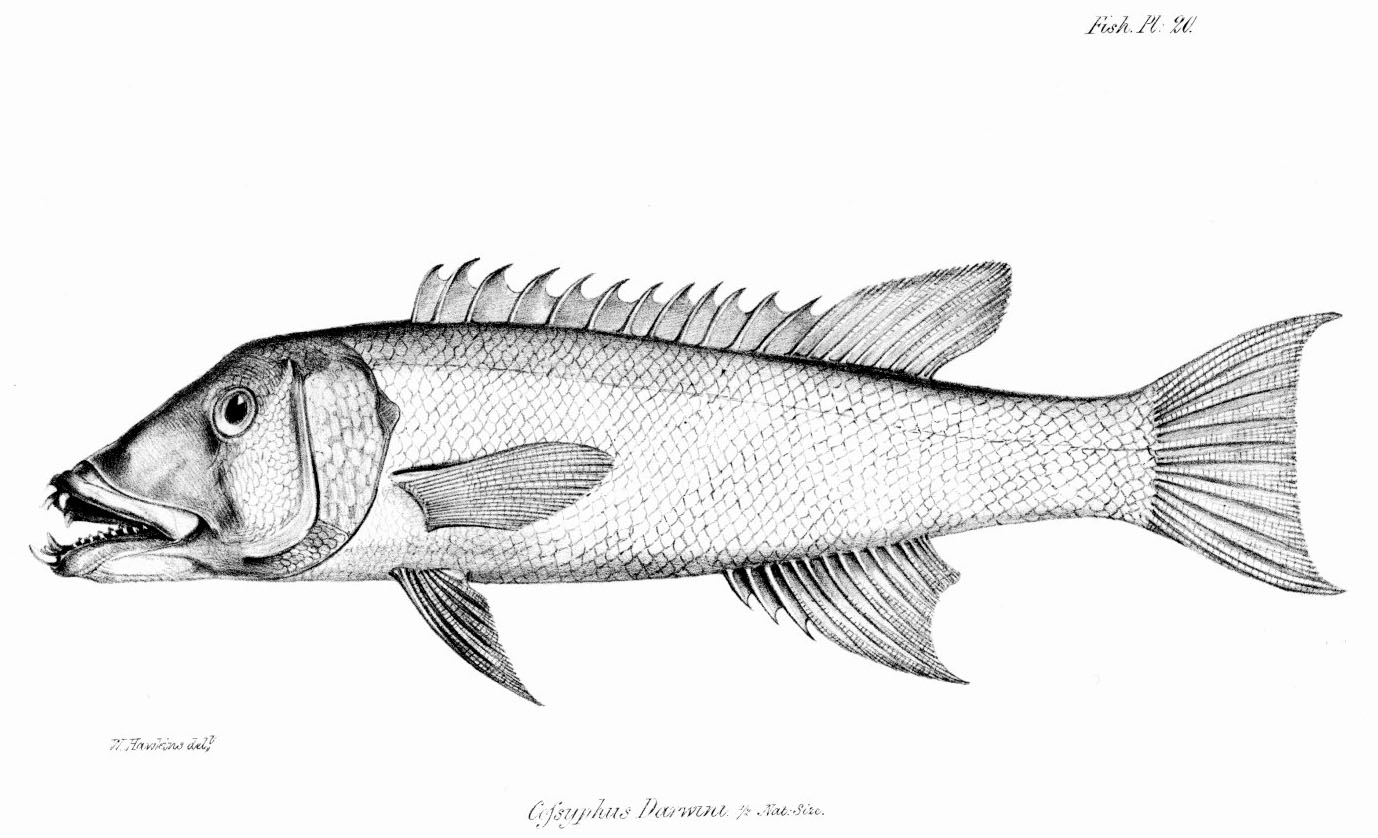

Conservation status
- Data Deficient (IUCN 3.1)

Scientific classification
- Kingdom: Animalia
- Phylum: Chordata
- Class: Actinopterygii
- Order: Labriformes
- Family: Labridae
- Genus: Bodianus
- Species: B. darwini

Binomial name
- Bodianus darwini (Jenyns, 1842)

Synonyms
- Cossyphus darwini (Jenyns, 1842); Dentex maculatus Pérez Canto, 1886; Labrus aper Valenciennes, 1846; Pimelometopon darwini (Jenyns, 1842); Semicossyphus maculatus (Pérez Canto, 1886)

= Bodianus darwini =

Species of fish

Bodianus darwini is a species of ray-finned fish native to the tropical eastern Pacific Ocean. Common names include the Chilean sheepshead wrasse, the goldspot sheepshead or the Galapagos sheepshead wrasse.

== Taxonomy ==
Traditionally it was placed in the genus Semicossyphus, until molecular phylogenetics found that Semicossyphus should be lumped into Bodianus, as Semicossyphus was nested deep within Bodianus.

== Description ==
This is a large wrasse, with a maximum length of 70 cm (28 in). The dorsal fin has twelve spines and ten soft rays while the anal fin has three spines and twelve soft rays.

== Distribution and habitat ==
S. darwini is native to the tropical eastern Pacific Ocean. Its range includes the Galápagos Islands and on the coast of South America, extends from Ecuador southward through Peru to northern Chile. It is normally found among seaweed, including deep-water kelp forests, and its depth range is from 3 to 100 m (10 to 330 ft).

== Ecology ==
The strong sharp teeth provide evidence of its diet as a benthic predator, and this is confirmed by the stomach contents which include fragments of shells and other coarse calcareous debris as well as detritus. Other large carnivorous fish dwelling in the kelp forest include the Peruvian morwong (Cheilodactylus variegatus), the Chilean sandperch Pinguipes chilensis, the sea chub Graus nigra, and the cabrilla (Sebastes oculatus). These fish are preyed on by the marine otter (Lutra felina) and the South American sea lion (Otaria flavescens).

== Status ==
S. darwini is caught for food throughout its range and is fished commercially in the Galápagos Islands. It is a large, and probably a slow-growing, fish which makes it vulnerable to over exploitation. There was a decline of 80% in the Galapagos populations during the 1997–1998 El Niño event, but the fish stock recovered in the following year, making it likely that the fish had moved to deeper water during the adverse conditions. The International Union for Conservation of Nature considers that there is not enough evidence to assess the conservation status of this fish and has rated it as "data deficient".

== Etymology ==
The fish is named in honor of English naturalist Charles Darwin (1809-1882), whose researches in the Galapagos Archipelago, where he obtained the type specimen of this wrasse.
