= Chirodactylus jessicalenorum =

Conservation status
- Data Deficient (IUCN 3.1)

Scientific classification
- Kingdom: Animalia
- Phylum: Chordata
- Class: Actinopterygii
- Order: Centrarchiformes
- Family: Cheilodactylidae
- Genus: Chirodactylus
- Species: C. jessicalenorum

Binomial name
- Chirodactylus jessicalenorum Smith, 1980

Species of seabream fish

Chirodactylus jessicalenorum, the natal fingerfin, is a species of ray-finned fish within the family Cheilodactylidae. It is found in the Indian Ocean off the coast of South Africa, at depths of 3 to 20 metres (10 to 70 ft) below sea level.

== Biology ==
Chirodactylus jessicalenorum can grow to a maximum length of 50 centimetres (20 in), although it is more commonly found at a length of 30 cm (12 in). Its body is scarlet in coloring, with a reddish black blotch at the pectoral base. It lives in rocky banks off shore lines, where it feeds on small invertebrates such as worms, crabs, and mollusks, although it can occasionally eat squid and small fish as well.

== Conservation ==
Chirodactylus jessicalenorum has minor commercial importance, as it is mainly caught through the use of spears where it is then sold fresh in local fish markets. It is also bycatch and is a game fish, although it is not known how much these impact the overall population.

No conservation efforts have been made so far, and its range likely already overlaps with several marine protected areas in South Africa. It has been classified as 'Data deficient' by the IUCN Red List, as more information is needed to fully understand its current population and impact from fishing.
