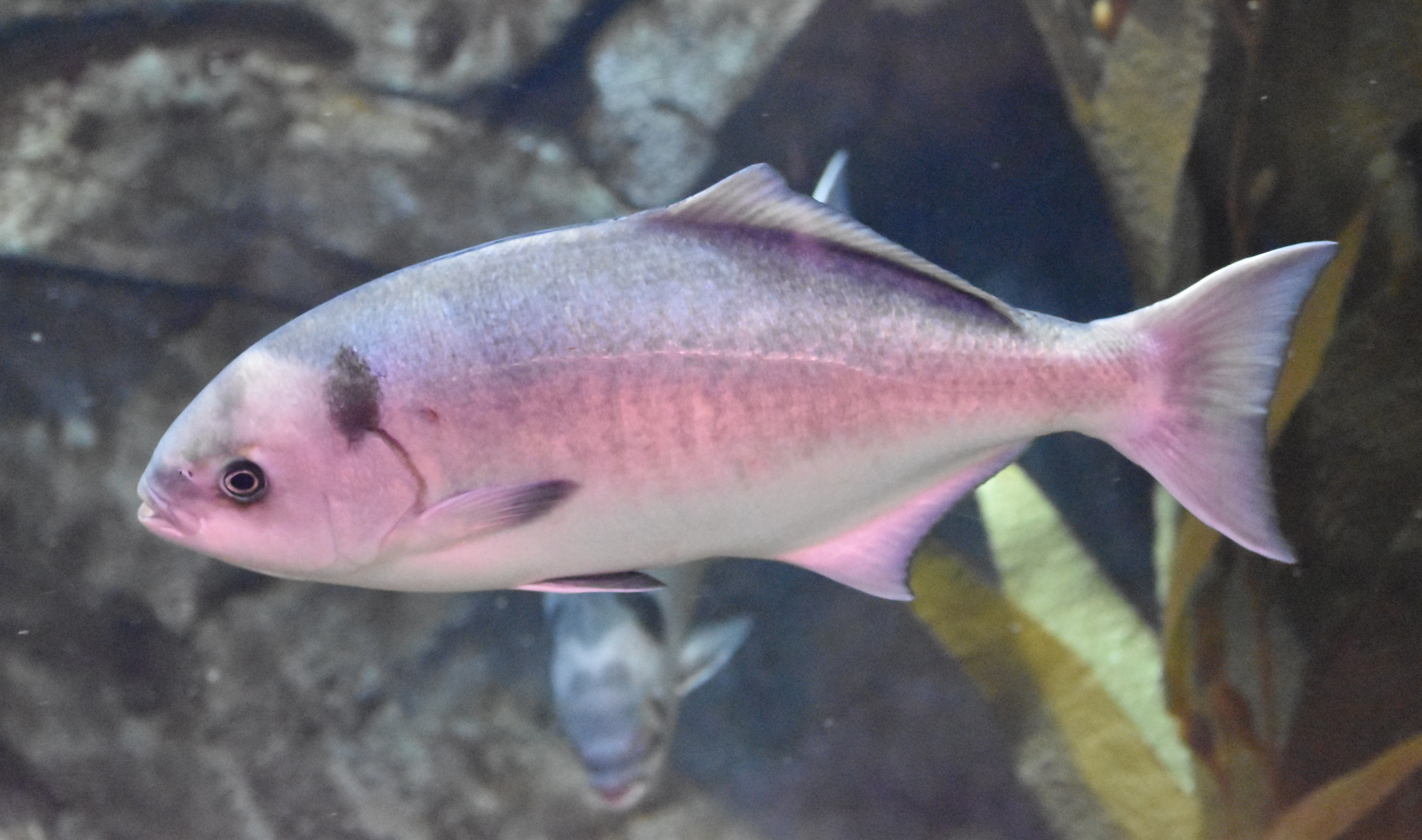
- Medialuna californiensis

Scientific classification
- Kingdom: Animalia
- Phylum: Chordata
- Class: Actinopterygii
- Order: Centrarchiformes
- Family: Scorpididae
- Genus: Medialuna; D. S. Jordan & Fesler, 1893

Type species
- Scorpis californiensis Steindachner, 1876

= Medialuna (fish) =

Genus of fishes

Medialuna is a genus of sea chubs native to the eastern Pacific Ocean.

== Species ==
There are currently two recognized species in this genus:

- Medialuna ancietae Chirichigno F., 1987
- Medialuna californiensis (Steindachner, 1876) (Halfmoon)
