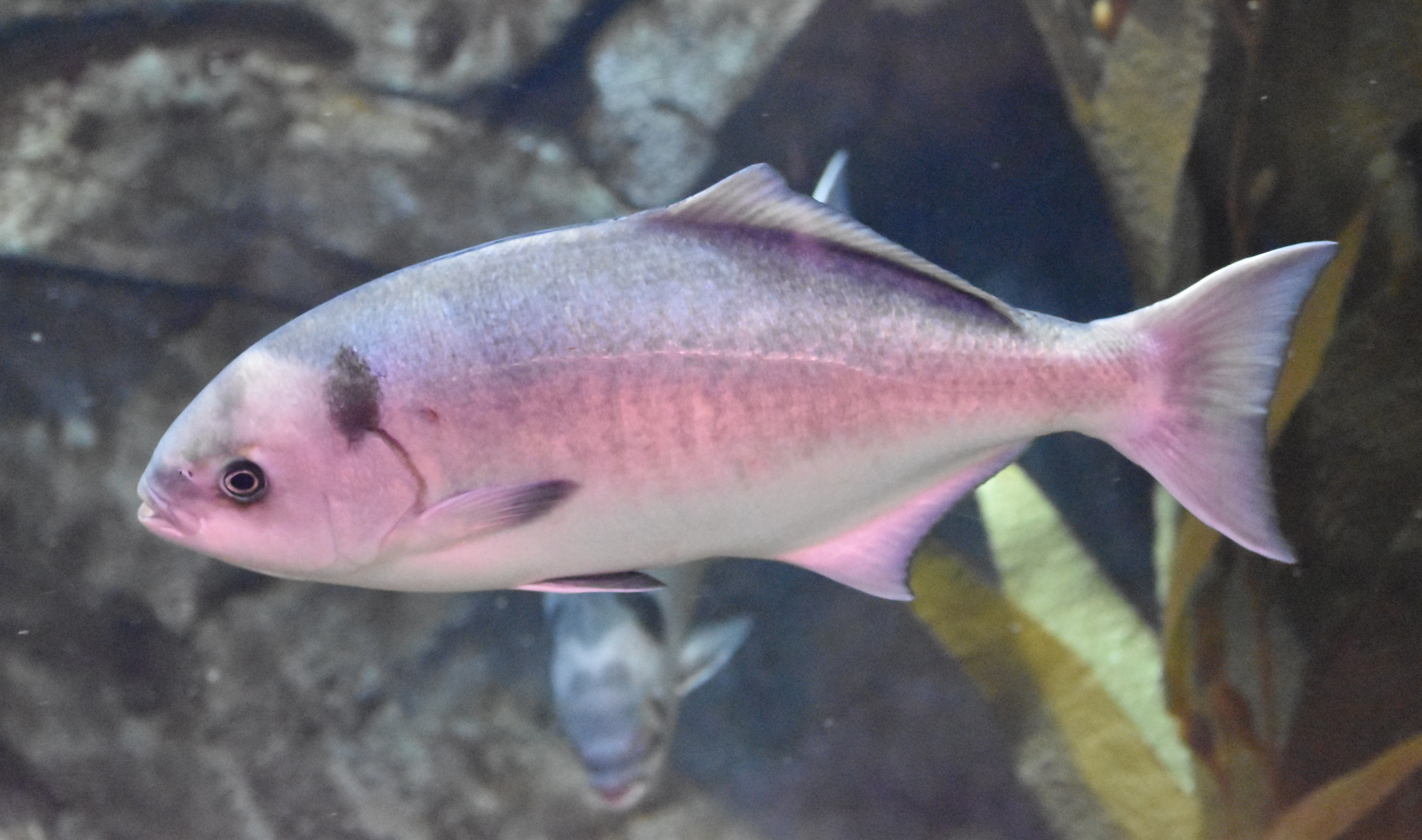

Conservation status
- Least Concern (IUCN 3.1)

Scientific classification
- Kingdom: Animalia
- Phylum: Chordata
- Class: Actinopterygii
- Order: Centrarchiformes
- Family: Scorpididae
- Genus: Medialuna
- Species: M. californiensis

Binomial name
- Medialuna californiensis (Steindachner, 1876)

Synonyms
- Scorpis californiensis Steindachner, 1876

= Halfmoon =

Species of sea chub

The halfmoon (Medialuna californiensis), also known as the blue perch, is a species of marine ray-finned fish, a sea chub from the family Scorpididae. It is native to the coasts of the eastern Pacific Ocean off western North America. It is fished for using hook and line and it is a desirable food fish.

== Taxonomy ==
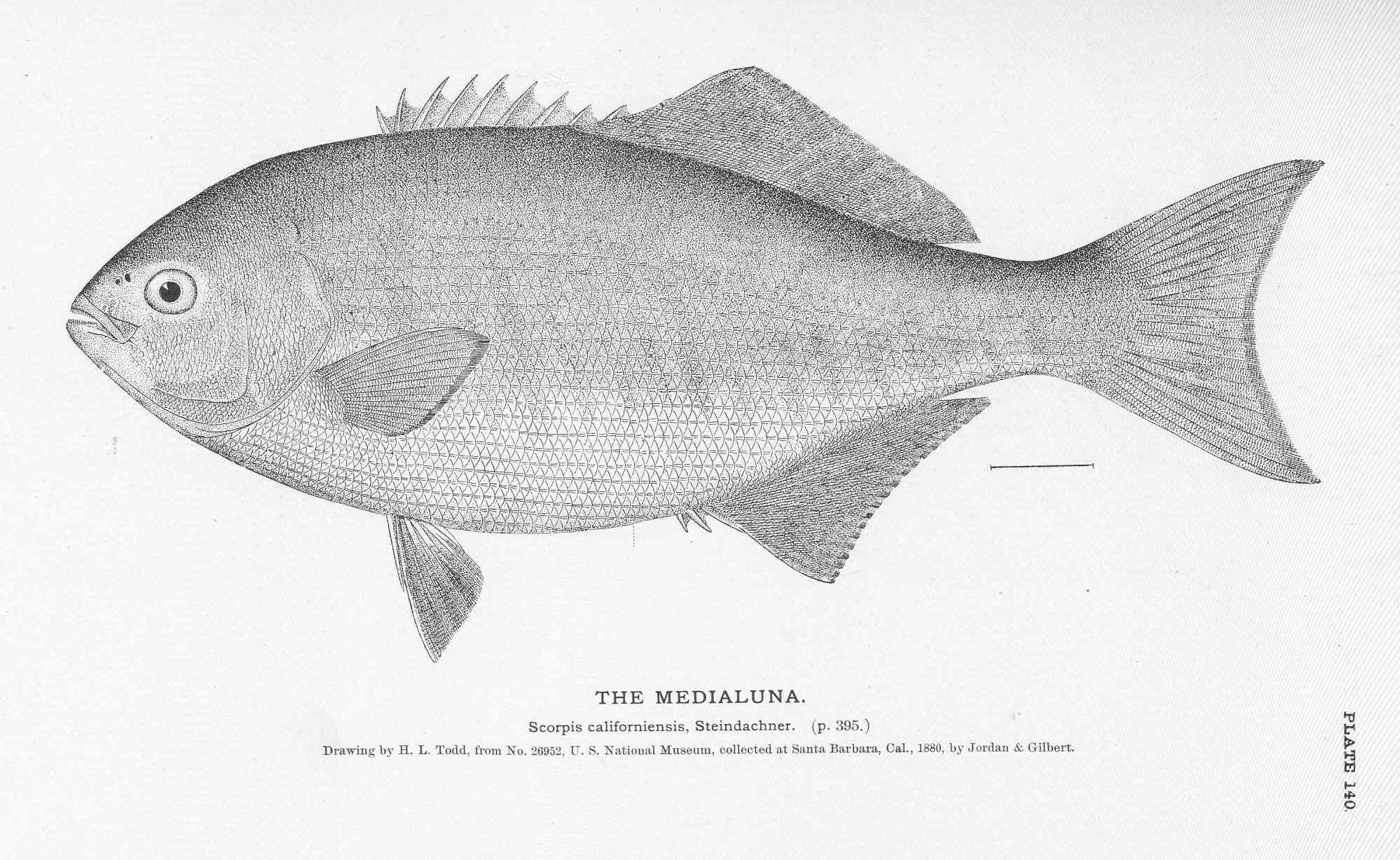
1884 illustration

The halfmoon was first formally described as Scorpis californiensis in 1876 by the Austrian ichthyologist Franz Steindachner with the type locality given as San Diego, California.

== Distribution ==
The Halfmoon is native to the eastern Pacific Ocean along the western coast of North America from Vancouver Island in the north to the Gulf of California, although it is rare north of Point Conception in California.

== Description ==
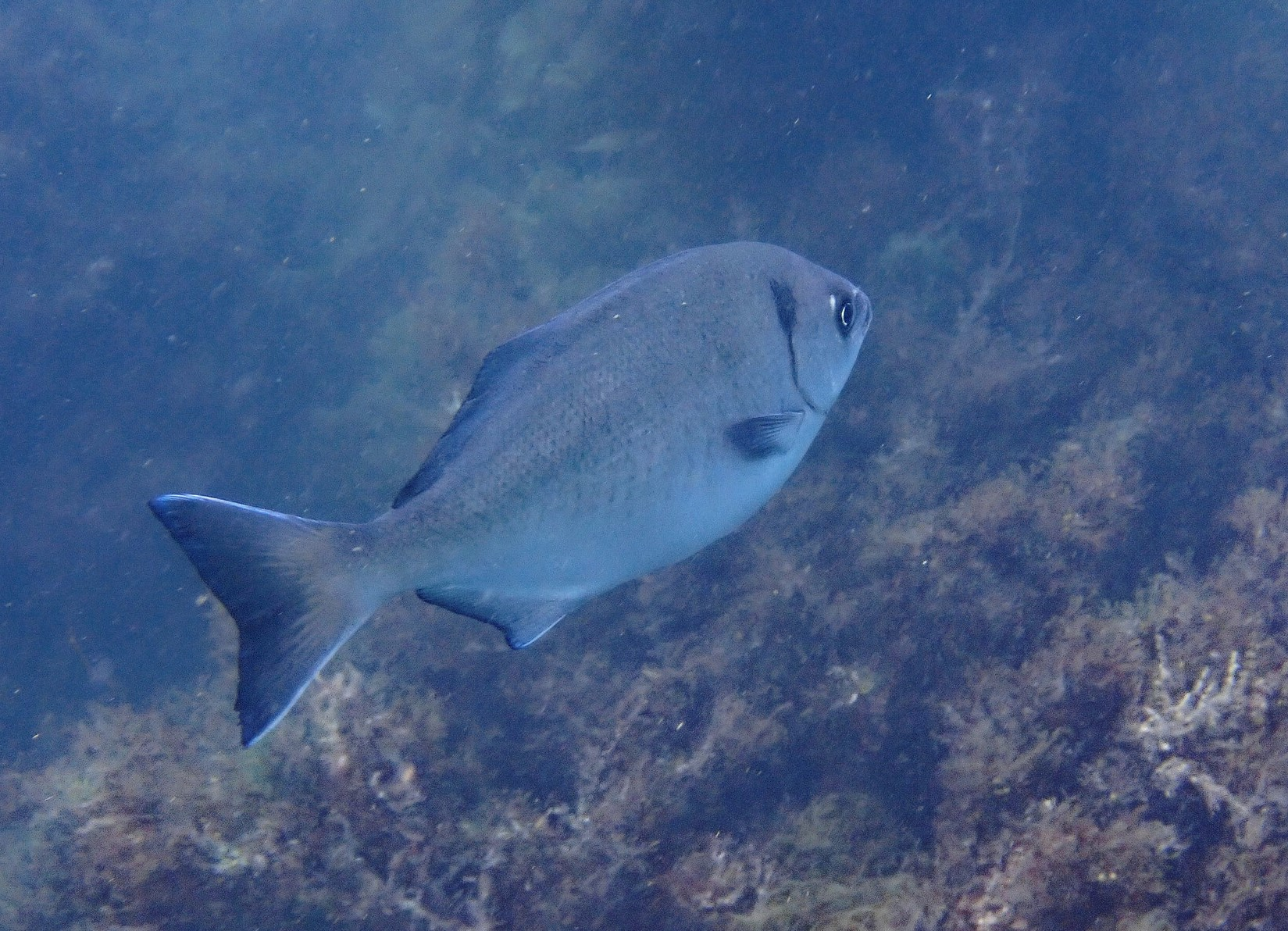
Halfmoon

The halfmoon has an elongate, compressed, oval body with a small pointed head. It has a small, horizontal mouth in which the upper jaw is partially hidden by the orbital bone when the mouth has closed. Each jaw has a single row of pointed teeth. It has a continuous dorsal fin which has 9–11 spines in the anterior portion which fold down into a scaly furrow, the posterior portion has 22–27 soft rays and these are higher than the spines. The anal fin has 3 spines and 17–21 soft rays. The caudal fin is marginally concave. Most of the head and body is covered in small, thick and rough scales except foe the area forward of the eyes. The colour is dark bluish grey to grey dorsally, paler ventrally sometimes with faint, narrow, vertical bars along the flanks. It has a dark blotch on the upper corner of the gill cover. The margins of the dorsal, anal and caudal fins are dark and the outer edge of each lobe of the caudal fin is white. Juvenile fish are blue above and silvery below. The maximum recorded total length of the halfmoon is 48 centimetres (19 in). The shape of the caudal fin is said to resemble a crescent moon, leading to the common name.

== Habitat and biology ==
The halfmoon is frequently observed high in the water column over rocks and at middle depths over kelp. Their preferred habitats are rocky reefs, kelp forests, floating kelp pads, and oil rigs. They are occasionally recorded near the surface of the water, but they are commonly found at depths between 3 and 40 metres (9.8 and 130 ft). This is an omnivorous species with kelp, red algae and green algae making up the bulk of its diet but it also feeds on a diversity of small invertebrates such as crustaceans, sponges and sea anemones. They are schooling fish. The juveniles are occasionally reported far offshore, although they are more frequent around shallow subtidal areas and kelp beds with the adults. In their first year they can still be as small as 2.54 centimetres (1.00 in) and can be found in schools of a dozen or more on the outer edge of kelp beds and in sea grass beds. These fish reach sexual maturity when they attain a length of about 20 centimetres (7.9 in) which is when they are roughly two years old. The spawning season runs from June through to October and they are broadcast spawners. The fertilised eggs and newly hatched larvae are planktonic. The larvae are most numerous off northern Baja California The juveniles will school with juvenile opaleye beneath floating rafts of kelp.

== Fisheries ==
The halfmoon is a prized species for recreational anglers using rod and line, it is a bycatch in traps and bait nets. In California its season runs from August to April. The flesh is lightly flavoured and the fish can be eaten as fillets or whole and cooked in a variety of methods.
