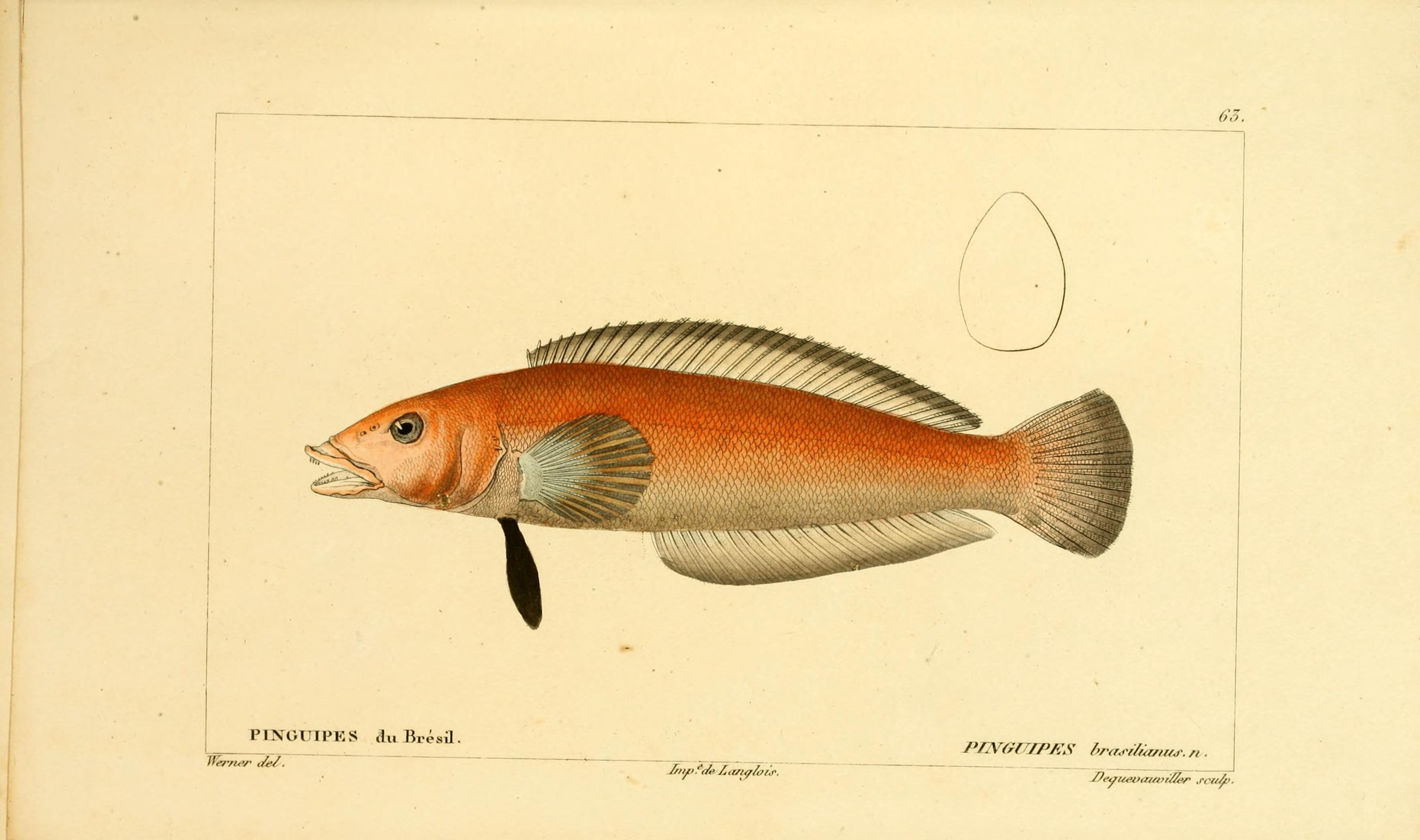

Scientific classification
- Domain: Eukaryota
- Kingdom: Animalia
- Phylum: Chordata
- Class: Actinopterygii
- Order: Labriformes
- Family: Pinguipedidae
- Genus: Pinguipes
- Species: P. brasilianus

Binomial name
- Pinguipes brasilianus Cuvier, 1829

Synonyms
- Neopercis atlanticus meridionalis Carvalho, 1956; Pinguipes fasciatus Jenyns, 1840

= Pinguipes brasilianus =

Species of fish

Pinguipes brasilianus, commonly known as the Brazilian sandperch, is a species of ray-finned fish in the family Pinguipedidae. It is found in the southwestern Atlantic Ocean off the coasts of Brazil and Argentina. It was first described in 1829 by the French naturalist Georges Cuvier.

== Description ==
Charles Darwin records the crew catching this fish with hook and line off the coast of northern Patagonia, at a time when the Beagle was anchored during bad weather. He described it as being chestnut brown above, banded transversely with black on the head, flanks and fins. The lower lip was pink and the underside of the fish was white. The eyes had yellow irises and black pupils.

== Distribution and habitat ==
Pinguipes brasilianus occurs in the southwestern Atlantic Ocean. Its range extends from Rio de Janeiro in Brazil southwards to Golfo Nuevo in Argentina. It has been reported twice in the central Mediterranean Sea. It is a demersal fish and its depth range is between 10 and 135 m (30 and 440 ft).

== Reproduction ==
Breeding takes place over an extended period of spring and summer, peaking between October and February. Females reach 50% maturity at an average total length of about 15 cm (6 in) and have a fecundity ranging from 2 to 44 oocytes per gram for medium size fish. The gonadosomatic index for males ranges between 0.11% and 0.75%. Both these figures are low and necessitates the pair being in close proximity when spawning takes place. The female releases several batches of eggs during the breeding season in a cycle involving courtship and pair bonding, the egg release sometimes taking place in a crevice in the reef.
