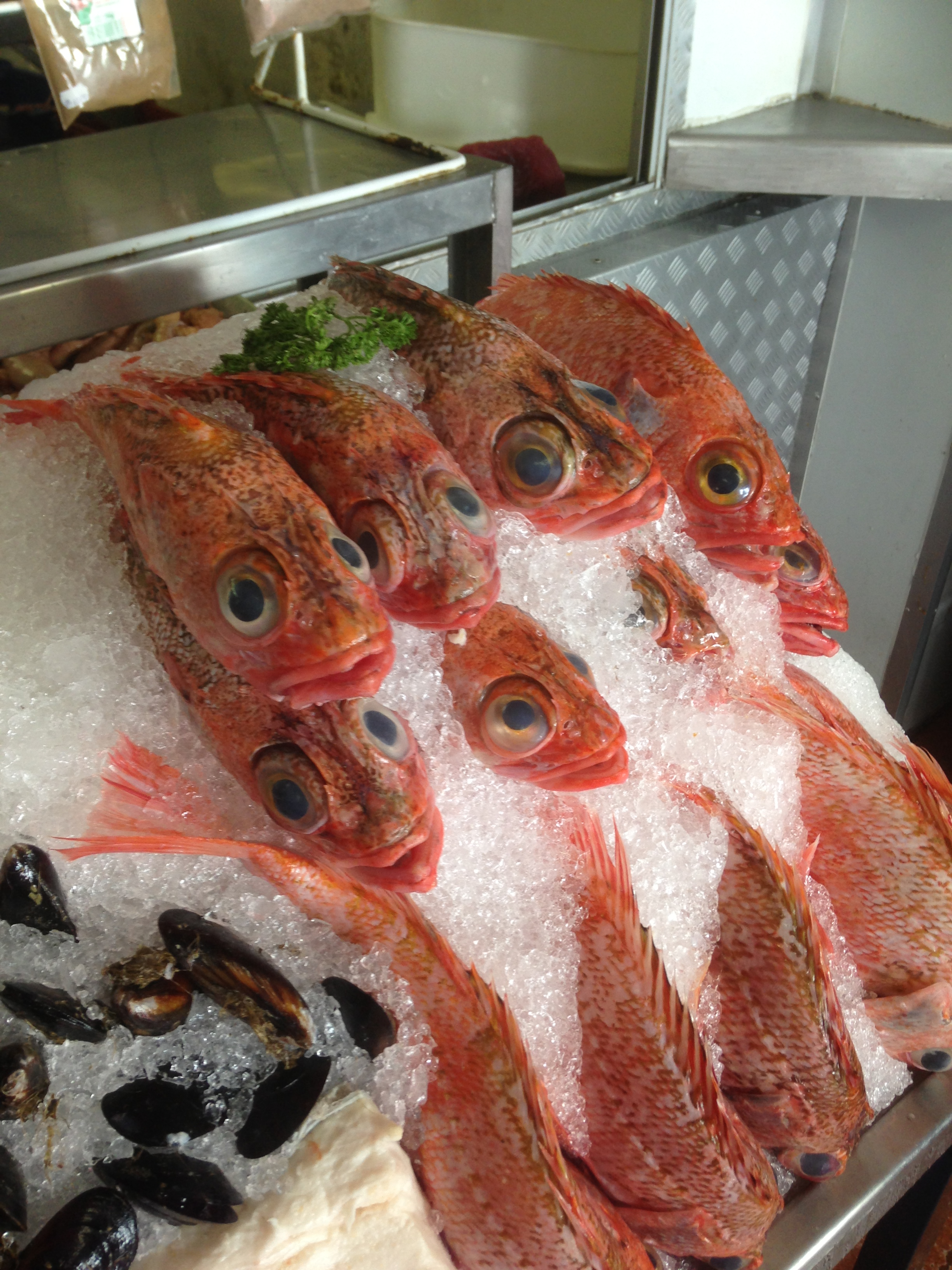
- Jacopever for sale in a Cape Town fish market

Conservation status
- Least Concern (IUCN 3.1)

Scientific classification
- Kingdom: Animalia
- Phylum: Chordata
- Class: Actinopterygii
- Division: Teleostei
- Order: Perciformes
- Family: Scorpaenidae
- Genus: Sebastes
- Species: S. capensis

Binomial name
- Sebastes capensis (J. F. Gmelin, 1789)

Synonyms
- Scorpaena capensis Gmelin, 1789; Sebastichthys capensis (Gmelin, 1789); Sebastes darwini Cramer, 1896; Sebastodes chilensis Steindachner, 1898; Sebastichthys chamaco Evermann & Radcliffe, 1917; Sebastes chamaco (Evermann & Radcliffe, 1917); Sebastodes chamaco (Evermann & Radcliffe, 1917)

= Sebastes capensis =

Species of fish

Sebastes capensis, the false jacopever or Cape redfish, is a species of marine ray-finned fish belonging to the subfamily Sebastinae, the rockfishes, part of the family Scorpaenidae. It is found in the South Atlantic Ocean and may also occur off southern and western South America.

== Taxonomy and etymology ==
Sebastes capensis was originally described by the German naturalist Johann Friedrich Gmelin in 1789 as Scorpaena capensis with the type locality given as the Cape of Good Hope. Some authorities place this species in the subgenus Sebastomus. It has recently been demonstrated that the specimens from Peru and Chile are actually attributable to the closely related S. oculatus and these two similar species are sympatric in the southwestern Atlantic off Argentina. The specific name capensis refers to the type locality, the Cape of Good Hope. The common name false jacopever derives from a name given to some groupers, originally in the Dutch East Indies and then in the Caribbean. It is a corruption of the name Jacob Evertsz, a Dutch sailor who was said to be a small man with yellowish skin, a pockmarked face and bulging eyes.

== Description ==
The Cape redfish is a demersal fish that grows to a maximum length of about 37 cm (15 in) though a more normal size is about 30 cm (12 in). The dorsal fin has about thirteen spines and thirteen soft rays and the anal fin has three spines and six soft rays. The general colour of this fish is reddish or brown, and there are five or six pale spots on its back.

== Distribution and habitat ==
The Cape redfish is found in subtropical waters in the southeastern Atlantic Ocean on the coasts of South Africa, Tristan da Cunha and Gough Island. Another population may be present in the southeastern Pacific Ocean off the coast of Chile. The depth range for this species is 20 to 275 m (66 to 902 ft).

== Biology ==
Sebastes capensis feeds on small benthic invertebrates. It is a viviparous species, retaining the eggs internally until they hatch. In the fiords of southern Chile, the young larvae occupy the channels where copepod eggs are plentiful while larger larvae move onto shelf areas where the salinity is higher and larger copepod prey is more abundant. It mainly feeds on mysids.

== Fisheries ==
Sebastes capensis is an economically important species to artisanal fishermen as well as being part of the bycatch in lobster potting in Tristan da Cunha and in fishing surveys off South Africa.
