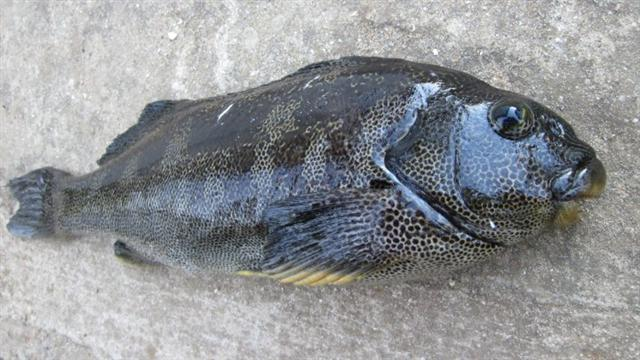

Scientific classification
- Kingdom: Animalia
- Phylum: Chordata
- Class: Actinopterygii
- Order: Centrarchiformes
- Family: Aplodactylidae
- Genus: Aplodactylus
- Species: A. punctatus

Binomial name
- Aplodactylus punctatus Valenciennes, 1832

Synonyms
- Haplodactylus punctatus (Valenciennes, 1832); Aplodactylus guttatus Guichenot, 1848; Haplodactylus guttatus (Guichenot, 1848); Aplodactylus reginae Guichenot, 1848; Haplodactylus reginae (Guichenot, 1848); Aplodactylus vermiculatus Guichenot, 1848; Haplodactylus vermiculatus (Guichenot, 1848)

= Aplodactylus punctatus =

Species of fish

Aplodactylus punctatus, the Zamba marblefish, is a species of marine ray finned fish, one of the marblefishes belonging to the family Aplodactylidae. It is found in the eastern Pacific Ocean of the west coast of South America.

== Taxonomy ==
Aplodactylus punctatus was first formally described in 1832 by the French zoologist Achille Valenciennes with the type locality given as Valparaíso in Chile. As it was the only species in the new genus Aplodactylus at the time of its description, it is the type species of that genus. The specific name punctatus means "spotted".

== Description ==
Aplodactylus punctatus has an elongate oblong and compressed body. The small mouth is located ventrally to the snout. The upper lips are fleshy, The teeth in the jaws are made up of three rows of tricuspid incisor like teeth with the outer row being larger than the others. There is a flattened spine on the operculum. The dorsal fin is deeply incised, it contains 16-17 spines and 18-21 soft rays, the soft-rayed part of the dorsal fin is highest at front. The anal fin contains 3 spines. 2 of which are small and partly free of the membrane with the third tightly attached to the first ray, and 6-9 soft rays. The lowest pectoral fin rays are simpled have robust tips extending beyond the membrane. There is a scaly, flesh sheath at the base of the spiny part of the dorsal fin. The maximum recorded total length for this species is 43.7 cm (17.2 in). The overall colour of this fish is olive green, fading ventrally, with the back and flanks having pale blotches, some of which create bars The body and the fins densely covered with small black spots, these sometimes merge to make short wavy lines. Fishes from the southern part of its range can be orange to yellow marked with black spots.

== Distribution and habitat ==
Aplodactylus punctatus is found in the temperate waters of the eastern Pacific Ocean along the western coast of South America where it is found from Callao in Peru south to Talcahuano in Chile. It is found in the shallow coastal waters, the juveniles in tidal pools and the adults below the low tide mark, it is normally associated with the kelp Lessonia trabeculata, at depths of.

== Biology ==
Aplodactylus punctatus is mostly herbivorous, grazing on brown, red and green algae, with a strong preference for green and red algae, digesting these by acid hydrolysis. This species has a close association with the kelp L. trabeculata throughout its life cycle. The juveniles feed on animals which live on the kelp fronds and so reducing the amount of grazers on the kelp and use the kelp to shelter in. The adults are herbivorous, consuming the kelp tissue for food. If the tissue eaten is reproductive, the grazing also act to reduce the amount of epiphytic algae on and around the sori. The algal zoospores can stay viable after digestion by the fishes, and microscopic sporophytes were produced at similar rates in undigested and digested reproductive tissue. There appears to be a positive link between the Zamba marblefish and the kelp occurring throughout their geographic distribution and the fish may function as a disperser of L. trabeculata.

== Fisheries ==
Aplodactylus punctatus is reputed to have very palatable flesh.
