= Neili =

Neili may refer to:

- Neili railway station, a railway station on the Taiwan Railways Administration West Coast line
- Neili Village (內壢里), Zhongli District, Taoyuan, Taiwan
- National Neili Senior High School, Zhongli, Taoyuan, Taiwan
- Scortum neili
- Sepedon neili
