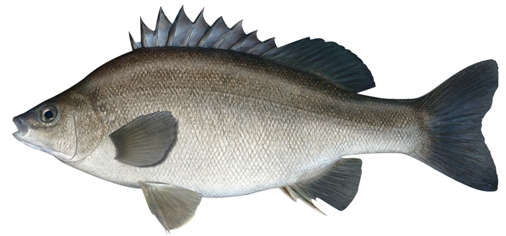

- Illustration (top), photo (bottom)

Conservation status
- Endangered (EPBC Act)

Scientific classification
- Kingdom: Animalia
- Phylum: Chordata
- Class: Actinopterygii
- Division: Teleostei
- Order: Centrarchiformes
- Family: Terapontidae
- Genus: Bidyanus
- Species: B. bidyanus

Binomial name
- Bidyanus bidyanus (Mitchell, 1838)

Synonyms
- List: Bidyanus bidyanus (Mitchell, 1838); Therapon ellipticus Günther, 1859; Acerina bidyana Mitchell, 1838; Therapon bidyanus (Mitchell, 1838); Therapon niger Castelnau, 1872; Terapon richardsoni Castelnau, 1872; Therapon macleayana Ramsay, 1882

= Bidyanus bidyanus =

Species of fish

The silver perch (Bidyanus bidyanus) is a medium-sized freshwater ray-finned fish of the grunter family Terapontidae, endemic to the Murray–Darling basin in south-eastern Australia.

A threatened species, the Australian Government reassessed the silver perch's conservation status using IUCN Criteria in 2024. The result was a re-listing of the species as "Endangered" under the EPBC Act (Australia's national environmental law), in striking contrast to a 2019 IUCN assessment suggesting the species was merely 'Near Threatened'.

== Taxonomy ==
The silver perch's scientific name comes from an Aboriginal name for the species – bidyan – recorded by Major Mitchell on the Barwon River on his 1832 expedition. (Mitchell's original scientific name for the species was Cernua Bidyana). Silver perch are not a true perch, which are species of genus Perca, but are instead a member of Terapontidae or "grunter" family. They are the largest member of the Terapontidae, capable of growing in excess of 60 cm (24 in) and close to 8 kg (18 lb), but today wild river specimens are typically 30–40 cm (12–16 in) and 1.0–1.5 kg (2.2–3.3 lb).

The silver perch is the only major representative of the family Terapontidae in the southern Murray-Darling system, compared to northern tropical systems where terapontid species are common. Another small terapontid, the spangled perch (Leiopotherapon unicolor), does occur sporadically in the northern Murray-Darling Basin.

Common names for Bidyanus bidyanus include silver perch, black or silver bream and the aboriginal names 'bidyan' (northern NSW) and 'tcheri/tcheeri' (South Australia).

== Description ==
The silver perch is a large grunter with a small head, small eyes, a small mouth at the end of a pointed 'beak-like' snout. The species is streamlined and laterally compressed, with a spiny dorsal fin of medium height, angular soft dorsal and anal fins and a forked tail. Large specimens become very deep bodied with a large hump behind the head. In terms of colouration, they are dark grey to silvery greyish-brown on the back, silver-grey on the sides, with darker scale margins giving a checkered pattern; the belly is whitish; the dorsal and caudal fins are dark, the pelvic fins white.

== Biology ==
=== Reproduction ===
Male silver perch reach sexual maturity at three years of age. Female silver perch reach sexual maturity at five years of age. Silver perch spawn in late spring and early summer. Originally water temperatures of close to 24 degrees Celsius were considered necessary for spawning to occur but as with all Murray-Darling fish species it has become apparent that the "required" spawning temperature is flexible and that they can and do spawn at lower temperatures. Researchers in the Barmah Forest region of the Murray River have collected drifting fertilised silver perch eggs in water temperatures as low as 17.2 degrees and as high as 28.5 degrees C, between early November and mid-February. Eggs were consistently collected in water temperatures above 20 degrees.

Silver perch are moderately fecund, with egg counts commonly around 200,000 to 300,000. Spawning occurs at the surface at dusk or the first few hours of night. The female sheds the eggs and the male fertilizes them in a few seconds of vigorous thrashing. The eggs are semi-buoyant and will sink without significant current, and take 24 to 36 hours to hatch.

A 1914 account describes a unique observation of silver perch spawning in the wild in the Murrumbidgee River:

The observer of a shoal engaged in distributing ova says: "Between 50 and 70 silver perch were playing—some feeding at the surface and others swimming about apparently aimlessly—in a series of eddies under a precipitous bank of the Murrumbidgee River, at a spot where the water was 10 or 12 foot deep. A section of the shoal, mostly the largest fish, remained in a central position. Suddenly, as though preconcerted, all the fish swam rapidly into a centre, splashing the water, in all directions, and becoming for an instant invisible owing to the agitation of the surface. Next moment the water all around and below the fish had assumed a whitish, opaque tinge, as though a bucket of milk had been thrown in; clearly caused by the extrusion of the milt of the male fish, and its contact with the colourless ova thrown out by the female fish. The operation was repeated five or six times at intervals of about 20 to 30 minutes. Soon after sundown the fish disappeared." The eggs of the silver perch are demersal and adhere to submerged roots, rushes, &c., in the vicinity of the eddies described. The observer considered what he had seen to be complete evidence of the spawning.

Silver perch continue the trend in native fish of southeast Australia of having high potential longevity. Longevity is a survival strategy in the often challenging Australian environment to ensure that most adults participate in at least one exceptional spawning and recruitment event, which are often linked to unusually wet La Niña years and may occur only every one or two decades. Silver perch can be relatively long-lived; the oldest individual aged so far was sampled from Cataract Dam, NSW (where a vitally important, self-sustaining, translocated population survives) and calculated to be 27 years old through otolith examination, while Murray River fish have been aged to 17 years old.

Research in 2017 unexpectedly found only a small proportion of silver perch in the surviving Murray River population older than seven years of age. It is not clear if these results are simply the result of a number of extreme blackwater fish kills in the Murray River between 2010 and 2022, the result of human / management impacts, or a true expression of the species' biology. The latter is doubtful as extensive sampling of the same population in the 1990s found a normal age structure with fish up to 17 years of age. More concerning is the possibility this represents new impacts from intensified river regulation, repeated blackwater events, or both, in turn leading to a narrowed window of time for breeding and recruitment (recalling females only reach sexual maturity at 5 years of age). The finding has sparked fresh concerns about the conservation of this imperilled species in a heavily regulated river system.

=== Diet ===
Silver perch are opportunistic feeders, feeding on insect larvae, molluscs, annelids and algae. The importance of vegetative matter in the diet of silver perch is still debated. Silver perch appear primarily to be a low-order predator of small aquatic invertebrates, with occasional intakes of small fish and vegetative matter. In aquaria, silver perch are reported to take bloodworms readily.

== Distribution ==
Silver perch are schooling mid-water fish with a preference for flowing water. Though nowadays found in the lowland reaches of the Murray-Darling system, they originally had a strong presence in the slope and upland reaches of many Murray-Darling rivers as well. In particular, they had a strong presence in upland reaches of the Murrumbidgee River and were originally found as far upstream as Cooma. As recently as the early 1980s, long summer migrations into the upland reaches of the Murrumbidgee were an annual event. Unfortunately these migrations, and these populations, have now collapsed — silver perch are functionally extinct in the Murrumbidgee River now, as in most parts of their former range.

Silver perch have been introduced into the Lake Eyre basin in arid central Australia. These releases were not officially sanctioned and pose serious hybridisation risks to closely related species of terapontids endemic to the Lake Eyre system.

A translocated and reproducing population of silver perch exists in Cataract Dam on the Hawkesbury-Nepean system. This population was established by NSW Fisheries translocations of juvenile fish from drying billabongs in the lower Murrumbidgee River in approximately 1915–17. The Cataract Dam population is unique in being the only population of silver perch in an artificial impoundment that regularly and successfully recruits and is self-sustaining. The long established prohibition on fishing, the consequent absence of alien fish and their diseases, and the pristine nature of the dam, including a largely undisturbed, thickly-forested sandstone-dominated catchment and an abundance of coarse rubble and gravel in many inshore areas, where fertilised eggs can settle and not be smothered by silt, are all likely contributors to this unique situation.

== Fishing ==
In past decades, silver perch were a popular game fish for many recreational anglers. Silver perch were typically caught on small baits such as worms and shrimps, and sometimes on smaller lures, generally in flowing and moving waters. They were also targeted using small spinnerbaits in rapids during summer migrations in upland rivers such as the upper Murrumbidgee River. Silver perch were renowned for being very fast and strong fighting fish.

The [fishing] rod is … used amongst the bream [silver perch] which run up to six pounds, and fight every inch of their way from the time they are struck till they are safely landed. … It is as easy to land a fifteen pound cod as it is a five pound bream, as the latter is notoriously the hardest fighter in our rivers, only being even nearly approached by the catfish.

== Conservation ==
As recently as the 1970s, silver perch abounded in the entire Murray-Darling Basin, vast though it is. Since then, however, they have undergone a mysterious, rapid and catastrophic decline. Silver perch have now declined close to the point of extinction in the wild. Based on simple catchment area estimates, the silver perch has disappeared from 87% of its former range. Only one sizeable, clearly viable and self-sustaining population now survives in their natural range, in the central reaches of the Murray River. For these reasons, the Australian federal government listed wild silver perch as threatened under national environmental law, initially as critically endangered (2013) and subsequently as endangered (2024). Silver perch are bred extensively in aquaculture but these domesticated strains and captive populations are of little use in ensuring the species' survival in the wild. Such aquacultured silver perch are regularly stocked into numerous artificial impoundments, and occasionally rivers, where, without exception, they fail to establish self-sustaining populations.

Reasons for the catastrophic decline of silver perch are only partially understood. Dams, weirs and river regulation and the virtual removal of annual spring floods appear to have removed the conditions silver perch need to breed and recruit successfully on a large geographic scale. However, silver perch are also noted to spawn on very small river rises and these too have been affected by river regulation.

Dams and weirs block the migrations of spawning adults and juveniles. Silver perch recruitment and population dynamics occur over scales of hundreds of kilometres, and migration is critical. This is reflected in movement/migration records for the species, the most notable being:

- One adult silver perch moving 110 km upstream and another 570 km upstream
- One adult silver perch moving 897 km between Lock 9 and Torrumbarry Weir on the Murray River between October 2016 to January 2017
- Some adult silver perch moving up to 1,200 km
- One adult silver perch in the lower Murray recaptured in the Barwon River, a migration distance of 2,565 km

Weirs also trap drifting silver perch eggs, where they sink into fine weir pool sediments and die. Weir can also divert drifting silver perch eggs (and larvae) into irrigation offtakes, also resulting in eventual death. Weirs can kill most drifting silver perch larvae that pass through them if they are of the lesser-used undershot design; studies have proven more than 90% of silver perch passing through undershot weirs are killed.

It is not widely appreciated that silver perch eggs sink in still water; silver perch eggs are often inaccurately described as simply being pelagic, or "floating". The eggs may actually settle onto the substrate in the wild and should perhaps be considered benthic in many circumstances rather than pelagic. This is likely a factor in their recent serious declines; silver perch may rely on their eggs settling onto clean, well oxygenated substrates of coarse sediments. In this era of flow regulation and flood curtailment by dams, which control the flood events that remove fine sediment, and chronic siltation from poor agricultural practices, the eggs may now frequently land in anoxic fine sediment and organic matter — including in weir pools — and fail to survive. It may be that the section of the central Murray River that supports the last clearly viable natural population of silver perch primarily does so because it supplies a sufficiently long stretch of weir-free river, under standard regulated flows, for eggs to successfully complete their drift and hatch larvae into relatively natural, suitable riverine habitats for survival.

Suspicions are also mounting that there is competition for food between alien ('introduced') carp and silver perch at larval, juvenile and adult stages. Competition at the larval stage is potentially the most serious. Indeed, suspicions are mounting that alien carp are having very large impacts on a number of native Murray-Darling fish species due to competition at the larval stage, and that these impacts have so far been underestimated.

Alien pathogens such as EHN virus and possibly similar viruses, introduced via importation of non-native fish, are now strongly suspected of playing pivotal role in the species' decline, and may explain the suspicious, very rapid collapse of some populations (e.g. upper Murrumbidgee).

since 2000, the installation of fishways in many Murray River weirs, so that native fish can pass through them and successfully migrate long distances again, and recent carefully managed environmental flow events, have seen the last remaining viable natural population of silver perch increase in number and expand slightly in geographic range.
