= Trumpeter (disambiguation) =

A trumpeter is a musician who plays the trumpet.

Trumpeter may also refer to:

== Animals ==
Birds:

- Psophia, a small genus of birds restricted to the forests of the Amazon and Guiana Shield in South America
- Trumpeter (pigeon), some breeds of domesticated pigeon
- Trumpeter swan, a large swan, sometimes informally called a "trumpeter"

Fish:

- Trumpeter (fish), a family of marine fish Latridae
- Trumpeter whiting (Sillago maculata)
- Yellowtail trumpeter (Amniataba caudavittata)
- Terapon

== Ships ==
- HMS Trumpeter (D09), an escort carrier that served in the Royal Navy during World War II
- HMS Trumpeter (1947), an LST(3) in service 1947-56
- HMS Trumpeter (P294), a patrol boat in the Royal Navy
- USS Trumpeter (DE-180), a World War II–era US Navy destroyer escort
- USS Trumpeter (DE-279), alternate name of HMS Kempthorne

== Places ==
- Trumpeter, Edmonton, a neighbourhood in northwest Edmonton, Alberta, Canada
- Trumpeter Islets, a group of two small islets near the southern end of the western coast of Tasmania, Australia

== Other uses ==
- Trumpeter (rank), a regiment specific, descriptive name given to Privates in the British Army
- Trumpeter (company), a plastic model kit company based in China
- Trumpeter clock, a type of clock that uses air vibrating a reed to mimic the sound of a trumpet
- Trumpeter Books, an imprint of Shambhala Publications
- The Trumpeter (song), 1904 song
- The Trumpeter (journal), Canadian academic journal

== See also ==
- List of trumpeters
- Trumper, a surname
