= Fortescue grunter =

Conservation status
- Endangered (IUCN 3.1)

Scientific classification
- Kingdom: Animalia
- Phylum: Chordata
- Class: Actinopterygii
- Division: Teleostei
- Order: Centrarchiformes
- Family: Terapontidae
- Genus: Leiopotherapon
- Species: L. aheneus

Binomial name
- Leiopotherapon aheneus (Mees, 1963)

Synonyms
- Therapon aheneus Mees, 1963

Species of fish

The Fortescue grunter (Leiopotherapon aheneus) is a species of freshwater ray-finned fish, a grunter from the family Terapontidae. It is endemic to rivers in Western Australia.

== Description ==
The Fortescue grunter has a moderately deep, slightly compressed oval body with convex dorsal profile and a largely straight ventral profile. It has an oblique mouth, which reaches as far as the level of the front of the eye. The upper and lower jaws are equipped with conical teeth with the outer row being enlarged and there are no teeth on the roof of the mouth. The body is covered in finely ctenoid and there is a continuous, smoothly curved lateral line. The dorsal fin is continuous, the spiny part contains 11–13 spines and is arched with the fifth spine being the longest, the spines behind that decreasing in size. There are 8–9 soft rays in the dorsal fin and the longest of these are shorter than longest dorsal spines. The anal fin has 3 spines and 8–9 rays. The caudal fin is emarginate. They are bronze in colour with the young fish having vertical bars. The colour is brown to blackish and there may be 10–15 fine, wavy lines along the body. The intensity of the colour varies between river systems. The head is dark above and paler below. The caudal fin is darker towards the base and slightly dusky along its edge, particularly on the upper lobe. The fins on the body can be clear to dusky in pigment.

== Distribution ==
The Fortescue grunter is endemic to the Pilbara region of Western Australia and has been recorded from the Ashburton River to the upper reaches of the Fortescue River.

== Habitat and biology ==
Adult Fortescue grunters are found rocky pools and the slow-flowing sections of streams, as well as in schools at the base of small waterfalls. It is an omnivore and small prawns and juvenile fishes have been recorded in its diet. The male fish guard and fan the eggs.

== Usage ==
The Fortescue grunter has some commercial value as an aquarium pet.

== Conservation ==
The Forescue grunter is classified as Endangered by the IUCN. The main threats are the degradation of the drainage systems by overgrazing, pollution from mining and introduced alien specs such as mollies and the crayfish Cherax quadricarinatus.

== Species description and etymology ==
The Fortescue grunter was first formally described as Therapon aheneus in 1963 by the Dutch ornithologist and ichthyologist Gerlof Mees (1926-2013) with the type locality given as Millstream Pool. Western Australia. The specific name aheneus refers to the bronze colour shown by this species.
