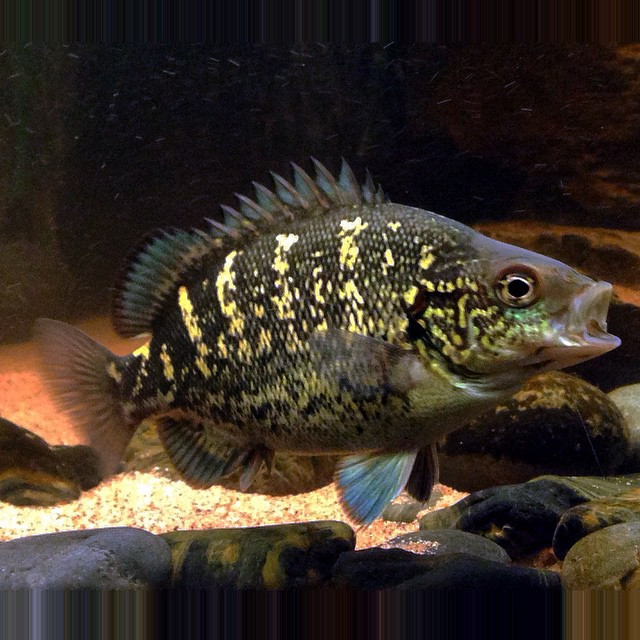

Conservation status
- Least Concern (IUCN 3.1)

Scientific classification
- Kingdom: Animalia
- Phylum: Chordata
- Class: Actinopterygii
- Order: Centrarchiformes
- Family: Terapontidae
- Genus: Hephaestus
- Species: H. carbo

Binomial name
- Hephaestus carbo (J. D. Ogilby & McCulloch, 1916)

Synonyms
- Therapon carbo Ogilby & McCulloch, 1916; Leiopotherapon suavis Whitley, 1948; Archeria jamesonoides Nichols, 1949

= Hephaestus carbo =

Species of fish

Hephaestus carbo, the coal grunter or black grunter, is a species of freshwater ray-finned fish, a grunter from the family Terapontidae. It is endemic to rivers in northern Australia.

== Description ==
Hephaestus carbo has a deep body which is oblong and oval in shape and also slightly compressed. The dorsal profile is straight from the snout to the nape; then there is a bugle between the head and the start of the dorsal fin. The ventral profile is evenly curved from the tip of the lower jaw to the anus. The upper jaw is slightly longer than the lower jaw, and the mouth is oblique and equipped with villiform teeth, with much larger teeth in the outer row. The lateral line is continuous and evenly curved. The dorsal fin is continuous; the spiny part is low and contains 11-13 spines and is arched in shape, with the fifth to seventh spines being the longest, although the longest dorsal spine is shorter than the longest dorsal soft ray. The soft-rayed part of the dorsal fin is rounded and contains 13-14 soft rays. All three anal spines are short, robust and curved, with the first one being half as long as the second, and the third being slightly shorter than the second. The anal fin soft rays are all longer than the spines, and there are 11-12 of them. The caudal fin is rounded to truncate.

The head, body, and fins are a uniform blackish colour overall, with gold speckles over the head and body. The juveniles are more colourful than the adults, and have bright yellow to orange markings with a reddish-orange ring around the eye. The maximum recorded standard length is 33 centimetres (13 in).

== Distribution ==
Hephaestus carbo has only been recorded from northern Australia, where it is found in the Goyder River in the Northern Territory and the rivers which drain into the Gulf of Carpentaria and the Timor Sea in Queensland from the Gregory River in the east to the Jardine River.

== Habitat and biology ==
Hephaestus carbo shows a preference for clear, flowing water over a sandy substrate, but it is recorded in turbid water with a muddy substrate at times. They prefer the upper reaches of coastal river drainage systems where the water temperature is always in excess of 15 °C (59 °F). They are predatory and feed on small fishes and crustaceans, particularly prawns. Spawning is known to occur from November, and most likely continues until the early autumn in March. The males do not care for the eggs. These fish attain sexual maturity at a length of around 13 centimetres (5.1 in).

== Taxonomy ==
Hephaestus carbo was first formally described in 1916 as Terapon carbo by the Australian zoologists James Douglas Ogilby and Allan Riverstone McCulloch, with the type locality given as the upper waters of the Gregory River in Queensland.

The coal grunter is very similar to, and closely related to, Raymond's grunter (Hephaestus raymondi) of New Guinea.

== Usage ==
The colourful juveniles are found in the aquarium trade.
