= Sooty grunter =

Conservation status
- Least Concern (IUCN 3.1)

Scientific classification
- Kingdom: Animalia
- Phylum: Chordata
- Class: Actinopterygii
- Division: Teleostei
- Order: Centrarchiformes
- Family: Terapontidae
- Genus: Hephaestus
- Species: H. fuliginosus

Binomial name
- Hephaestus fuliginosus (Macleay, 1883)

Synonyms
- Therapon fuliginosus Macleay, 1883; Therapon bancrofti Ogilby & McCulloch, 1916; Terapon alligatoris Rendahl, 1922

Species of fish

The sooty grunter (Hephaestus fuliginosus), also known by the name black bream, blubberlips, Northern grunter or purple grunter, is a species of freshwater ray-finned fish, a grunter from the family Terapontidae. It inhabits coastal and inland freshwater creeks and rivers of northern Australia.

== Taxonomy ==
The sooty grunter was first formally described as Therapon fuliginosus in 1883 by the Scottish-Australian naturalist William John Macleay, with the type locality given as the Upper Burdekin River in northern Queensland.

The specific name fuliginosus, from the Latin word fuligo, "soot", refers to the sooty coloration of the species.

== Distribution ==
The sooty grunter is endemic to northern Australia from the upper Burdekin River in Queensland to the Daly River in the Northern Territory It has been reported from southern New Guinea. although this refers to an undescribed species but it is absent from the Cape York Peninsula. It has been widely translocated within Australia.

== Description ==
In the Northern Territory

The sooty grunter is a relatively large species of grunter. It is brownish-grey to sooty-black with darker scale margins, although some specimens may show golden blotches on the sides. The juveniles possess dark blotches on the anal fin and the soft-rayed part of the dorsal fin. There is a discontinuous lip fold on the ventral side of the lower mandible. As they grow, some individuals develop thick, fleshy lips. They have a moderately deep body which is oblong to oval in shape, laterally compressed, and a dorsal profile which bulges between the nape and the start of the dorsal fin. It has an oblique mouth, with the maxillary reaching the level of the front edge of the eye in the young, but as the fish grows, the gap between the eye and the maxillary increases. The teeth are conical and a little recurved in shape, and are arranged in bands, with those in the outer rows the largest. There are no teeth on the roof of the mouth. They have a continuous dorsal fin which contains 11-12 spines and 12-14 soft rays; the spiny part is arched with the fifth to seventh spines the longest, and the rays are longer than the spines. The anal fin contains three spines and 8-10 soft rays. The caudal fin is marginate.

Small individual, in Queensland

They have been recorded to have attained a maximum fork length of 54 centimetres (21 in), although they more commonly have a standard length of around 25 centimetres (9.8 in); the maximum weight of 6.2 kilograms (14 lb).

== Habitat and biology ==
Sooty grunters inhabit large flowing freshwater streams, preferring rapidly flowing waters with a rocky bottom and sparse aquatic plant cover. The species can tolerate acidic conditions to a pH of 4.0 and temperatures between 12 and 34 °C. It is an omnivorous species which has been recorded feeding on frogs, insects, worms, crustaceans, algae, plant roots and palm berries. They spawn during the summer as the water levels rise as a result of the monsoon, and they may spawn in groups. The males guard and fan the eggs after fertilisation.

== Fisheries ==
In Queensland

Sooty grunters are regarded as good angling fish. In Queensland there is a bag limit of 10 specimens.
