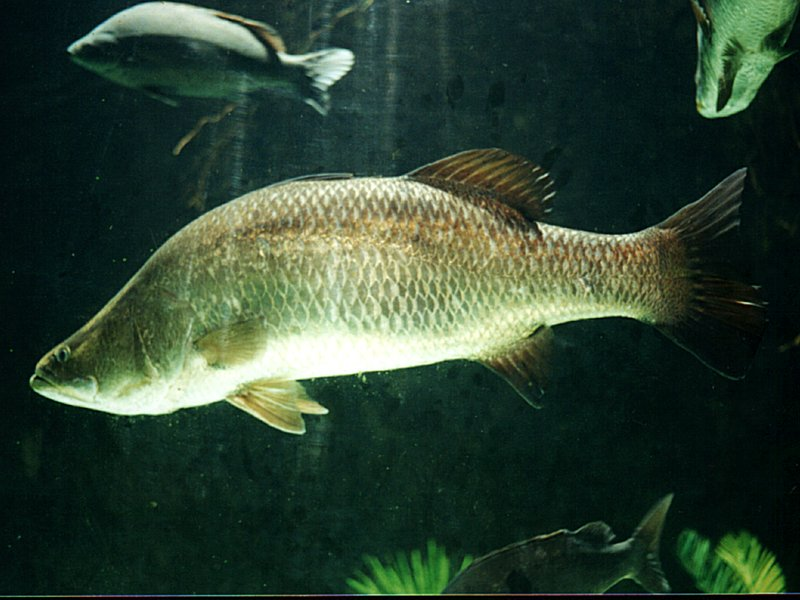
- Scortum barcoo (background) and a barramundi

Conservation status
- Least Concern (IUCN 3.1)

Scientific classification
- Kingdom: Animalia
- Phylum: Chordata
- Class: Actinopterygii
- Order: Centrarchiformes
- Family: Terapontidae
- Genus: Scortum
- Species: S. barcoo

Binomial name
- Scortum barcoo (McCulloch & Waite, 1917)

Synonyms
- Therapon barcoo McCulloch & Waite, 1917

= Scortum barcoo =

Species of ray-finned fish

Scortum barcoo is a species of ray-finned fish in the family Terapontidae, known by the common names Barcoo grunter and jade perch. It is endemic to Australia, where it can be found in certain major rivers, including the Barcoo River. It is reared in hatcheries.

== Description ==
This fish has a sturdy body and a small head. The body is brownish with darker blotches and darker fins. The fish reaches a maximum length of about 50 cm.

== Biology ==
The fish is omnivorous. Prey items include crustaceans, insects, molluscs, and fish.

Floods may trigger breeding in the wild fish.
