= Gilbert's grunter =

Conservation status
- Least Concern (IUCN 3.1)

Scientific classification
- Kingdom: Animalia
- Phylum: Chordata
- Class: Actinopterygii
- Order: Centrarchiformes
- Family: Terapontidae
- Genus: Pingalla
- Species: P. gilberti

Binomial name
- Pingalla gilberti Whitley, 1955

Species of ray-finned fish

Gilbert's grunter (Pingalla gilberti) is a species of freshwater ray-finned fish, a grunter from the family Terapontidae. It is endemic to Australia, where it is known from the Norman, Gilbert, and Flinders Rivers.

This grunter was described by Gilbert Percy Whitley in 1955, the specific name honours the English naturalist and explorer John Gilbert (1812-1845) after whom the type locality of this species, the Gilbert River, is also named.
