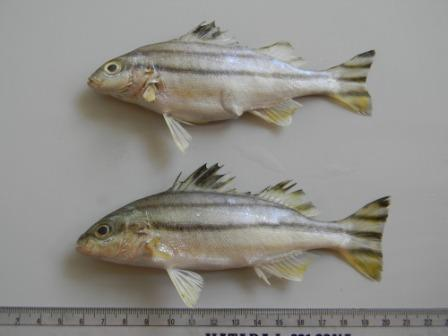

Conservation status
- Least Concern (IUCN 3.1)

Scientific classification
- Kingdom: Animalia
- Phylum: Chordata
- Class: Actinopterygii
- Division: Teleostei
- Order: Centrarchiformes
- Family: Terapontidae
- Genus: Terapon
- Species: T. puta

Binomial name
- Terapon puta Cuvier, 1829

Synonyms
- Authistes puta (Cuvier, 1829); Coius trivittatus Hamilton, 1822; Autisthes argenteus De Vis, 1884

= Terapon puta =

Species of fish

Terapon puta, the spiny-checked grunter, three-lined grunter, small-scaled banded grunter, small-scaled terapon, squeaking perch or two-lined grunter, is a species of fish from the Indo-Pacific region, it is a member of the grunter family, Terapontidae. It has also spread into the eastern Mediterranean Sea from the Red Sea through the Suez Canal, a process known as Lessepsian migration.

== Description ==
Juvenile, in Singapore

Terapon puta has an elongated and slightly compressed body. The dorsal fin is continuous, although there is a distinct notch between spiny forward part and soft rayed rear part. The spiny portion is strongly arched and the membrane between the spines is slightly incised. The penultimate dorsal spine is much shorter than last spine. The caudal fin truncated. It has a terminal mouth in which the jaws extend back to line up with the posterior nostril. It has two rows of teeth in the jaws, the outer row consisting of strong conical teeth and the inner row made up of villiform (brush-like) teeth which are arranged in bands. There are no teeth on the vomer or palatine. The preoperculum is serrated and there are two spines on the operculum which are level with the eye, the lower spine is the longer and extends as far or beyond opercular margin. Terapon puta is silvery-grey with four longitudinal, parallel stripes which extend from the head to the caudal fin, upper three stripes are black, the lowermost stripe is paler and varies from yellowish to brown. There is a large black spot on the upper part of front part dorsal fin. Grows to 15 cm (5.9 in) standard length, but more usually 5–12 cm (2.0–4.7 in).

== Distribution ==
Terapon puta has an Indo-Pacific distribution from the Red Sea south to Zanzibar and through entire Indian Ocean to the Philippines and northern Australia It was first recorded in the Mediterranean in the Bardawil Lagoon in the north of the Sinai Peninsula, Egypt in 1976 and in it 1977 it was recorded off Libya and off Alexandria in 1994. It is now prevalent in the south-eastern Mediterranean.

== Biology ==
Adult Terapon puta inhabit coastal waters and enter brackish estuaries and areas of mangrove and will even enter freshwater. It feeds on fish and invertebrates. They spawn in the summer and the male guards the eggs and fans water over them to ensure a good supply of oxygen.
