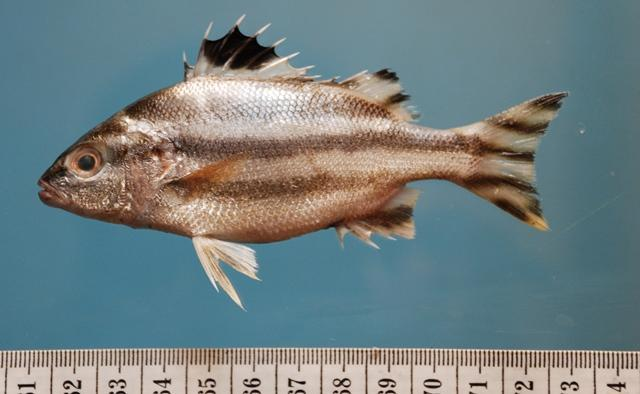

Conservation status
- Least Concern (IUCN 3.1)

Scientific classification
- Kingdom: Animalia
- Phylum: Chordata
- Class: Actinopterygii
- Division: Teleostei
- Order: Centrarchiformes
- Family: Terapontidae
- Genus: Terapon
- Species: T. theraps

Binomial name
- Terapon theraps Cuvier, 1829

Synonyms
- Eutherapon theraps (Cuvier, 1829); Perca argentea Linnaeus, 1758; Therapon rubricatus Richardson, 1842; Perca indica Gronow, 1854; Therapon nigripinnis Macleay, 1881

= Terapon theraps =

Species of fish

Terapon theraps, the largescaled terapon, banded grunter, banded trumpeter, flagtail grunter, flagtail trumpeter, large-scaled grunter-perch, northern grunter and spiky trumpeter, is a species of marine ray-finned fish, a grunter from the family Terapontidae. This species has a wide distribution in the Indo-Pacific region.

== Description ==
Juvenile, in Thailand

Terapon theraps is a medium sized species of grunter which has an oblong body which shows moderate lateral compression. The jaws are of equal length and the mouth is slightly oblique, gape slightly oblique. In juveniles the maxilla is set level with the front of the eyes, it doesn't reach the eye in adults. The teeth are conical in shape and are arranged in villiform bands with the outermost row greatly enlarged. There are no teeth on the roof of the mouth. The dorsal fin has 11 o 12 spines and 9 to 11 soft rays, the spiny part is notably arched and has a deep notch. The third to the sixth dorsal fin spines are the longest and the notch is created by the second last spine being around half the length of the last spine. The anal fin has three spines and 7-9 soft rays, the longest spine being the third and this is longer than the longest ray, The caudal fin has a shallow fork and rounded lobes. The lateral line contains 46-56 pored scales. This species is mainly dusky-green in colour with has a green iridescence which fades to silver-white on the belly. There are four broad dark, horizontal stripes along the flanks, a big black spot on the dorsal fin and dusky stripes on the tail. The juveniles are brown in colour and their stripes are darker and have white spots which run in lines in the paler areas between the dark stripes and they have a striped tail. This species attains a maximum total length of 30 centimetres (12 in).

== Distribution ==
Terapon theraps is a widespread species in the Indo-Pacific region being found from the southern Red Sea and along the eastern coast of Africa as far south as Madagascar and eastwards along the southern Asian coasts, including the Seychelles, and into the Pacific Ocean where it reaches as far north as southern Japan and south to Australia and east to New Caledonia. It has been recorded twice in the Mediterranean Sea in 2007 and 2008., likely transported via ballast water.

== Habitat and biology ==
Terapon theraps is a species of inshore waters in the tropics of the Indo-Pacific and it is common in brackish waters and among mangroves. The juveniles frequently hide below floating algae and flotsam, particularly mats of Sargassum, and this can lead to wide dispersal. It is an omnivorous species. After spawning the male parent guards and fans the eggs.

== Fisheries ==
Terapon theraps is targeted by inshore fisheries using a wide variety of gear such as traps, handlines, and bottom trawls. It is normally marketed fresh but is sometimes preserved by drying or salting.
