= Adamson's grunter =

Conservation status
- Critically Endangered (IUCN 3.1)

Scientific classification
- Kingdom: Animalia
- Phylum: Chordata
- Class: Actinopterygii
- Order: Centrarchiformes
- Family: Terapontidae
- Genus: Hephaestus
- Species: H. adamsoni

Binomial name
- Hephaestus adamsoni (Trewavas, 1940)

Synonyms
- Therapon adamsoni Trewavas, 1940

Species of ray-finned fish

Adamson's grunter (Hephaestus adamsoni) is a species of freshwater ray-finned fish, a grunter from the family Terapontidae, which is endemic to Lake Kutubu in the Kikori River system, Papua New Guinea.

== Habitat and biology ==
Adamson's grunter is numerous along the shores of Lake Kutubu. The juveniles are found in shallow water near the shore, and the adults aggregate in large schools in deep water next to rocky cliffs. This species is the main food of the Foi people who inhabit the shores of Lake Kutubu. The males fan and guard the eggs.

== Species description and etymology ==
Adamson's grunter was first formally described by Ethelwynn Trewavas as Therapon adamsoni in 1940. The specific name honours the English born Papuan civil servant and officer in the Royal Australian Navy officer Charles Thomas Johnston "Bill" Adamson (1901-1978).
