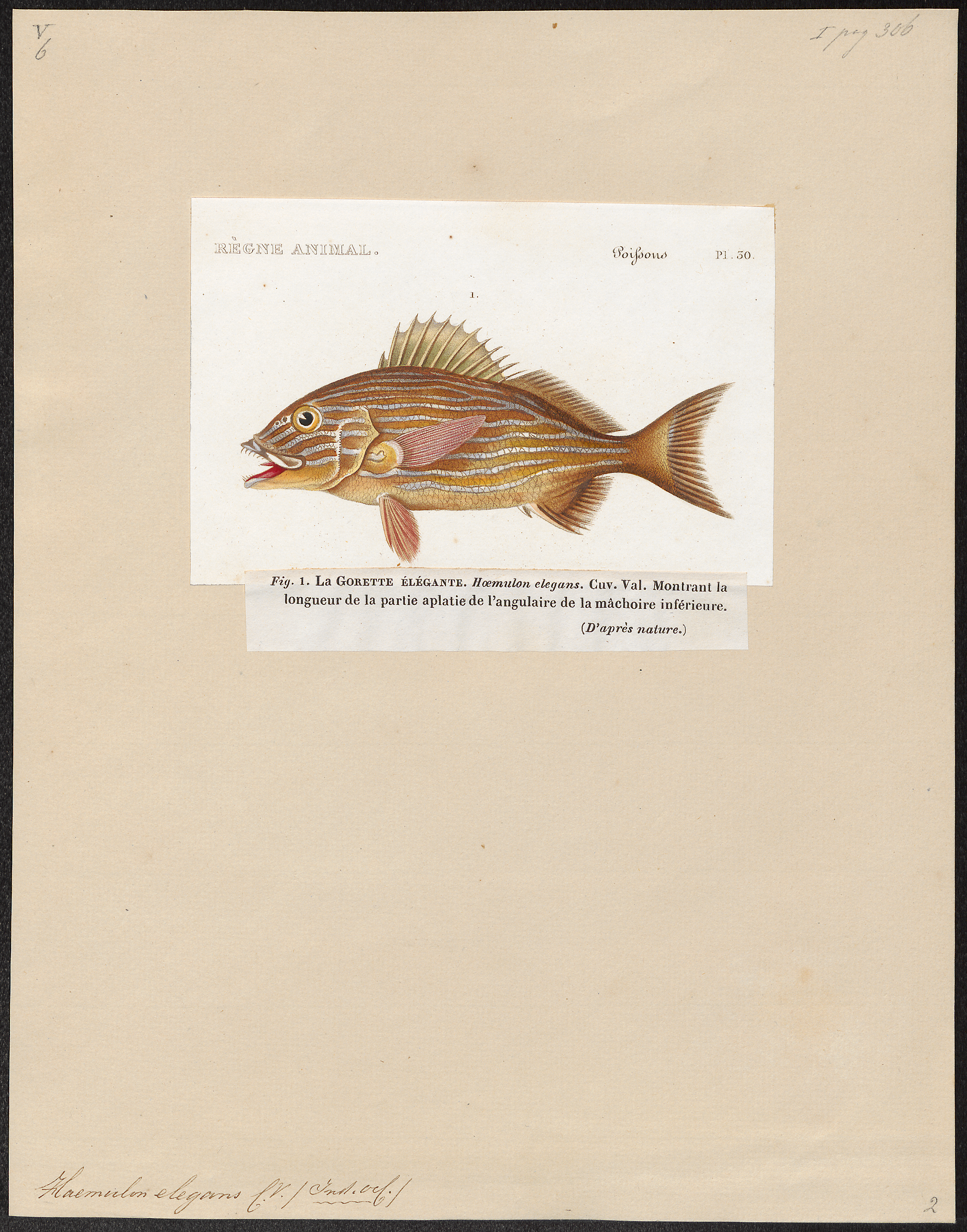

Conservation status
- Vulnerable (IUCN 3.1)

Scientific classification
- Kingdom: Animalia
- Phylum: Chordata
- Class: Actinopterygii
- Order: Centrarchiformes
- Family: Terapontidae
- Genus: Hephaestus
- Species: H. obtusifrons

Binomial name
- Hephaestus obtusifrons (Mees & Kailola, 1977)

Synonyms
- Therapon obtusifrons Mees & Kailola, 1977

= Striped grunter =

Species of ray-finned fish

The striped grunter (Hephaestus obtusifrons) is a species of freshwater ray-finned fish, a grunter from the family Terapontidae. It is found only in the Bewani Mountains in the headwaters of the Pual River system in Papua New Guinea and the upper Sermowai River, Western New Guinea, Indonesia.

== Habitat ==
It is found in high altitude, fast flowing mountain streams.

== Breeding behavior ==
The males guard and fan the eggs.

== Size ==
This species reaches a length of 12.5 cm (4.9 in).

== Etymology ==
The fish's name derives from the Latin obtusus, "obtuse;" frons, "front," presumably referring to its "even blunter snout" compared to the similar Hephaestus transmontanus, which was described in the same publication.
