= Kimberley spangled perch =

Conservation status
- Least Concern (IUCN 3.1)

Scientific classification
- Kingdom: Animalia
- Phylum: Chordata
- Class: Actinopterygii
- Order: Centrarchiformes
- Family: Terapontidae
- Genus: Leiopotherapon
- Species: L. macrolepis

Binomial name
- Leiopotherapon macrolepis Vari, 1978

Species of ray-finned fish

The Kimberley spangled perch (Leiotherapon macrolepsis), also known as the large-scale grunter, is a species of freshwater ray-finned fish from the family Terapontidae. It is endemic to the Kimberley region of Western Australia. It is one of the most common species in one of the tributaries of the Prince Regent River.

It is sometimes kept as an aquarium pet.
