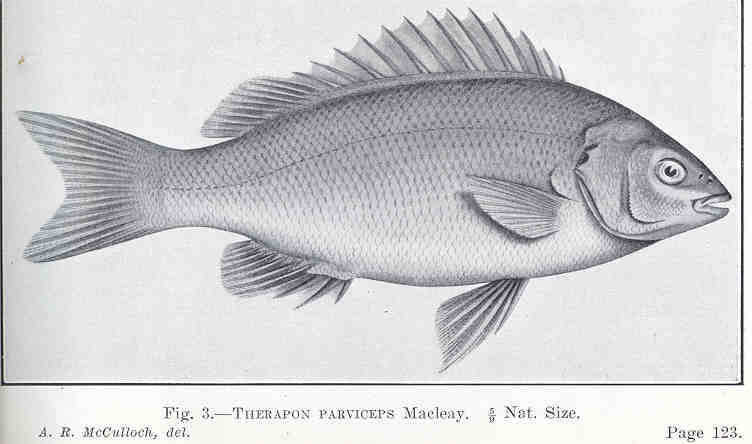

Conservation status
- Near Threatened (IUCN 3.1)

Scientific classification
- Kingdom: Animalia
- Phylum: Chordata
- Class: Actinopterygii
- Order: Centrarchiformes
- Family: Terapontidae
- Genus: Scortum
- Species: S. parviceps

Binomial name
- Scortum parviceps (Macleay, 1883)

Synonyms
- Therapon parviceps Macleay, 1883

= Small-headed grunter =

Species of ray-finned fish

The small-headed grunter (Scortum parviceps) is a species of ray-finned fish in the family Terapontidae. It is endemic to Australia where it is known only from the upper Burdekin River in Queensland.
