= Tiger grunter =

Conservation status
- Least Concern (IUCN 3.1)

Scientific classification
- Kingdom: Animalia
- Phylum: Chordata
- Class: Actinopterygii
- Order: Centrarchiformes
- Family: Terapontidae
- Genus: Amniataba
- Species: A. affinis

Binomial name
- Amniataba affinis (Mees & Kailola, 1977)

Species of ray-finned fish

The tiger grunter (Amniataba affinis) is a freshwater species of ray-finned fish within the family Terapontidae. The species inhabits rivers in Papea New Guinea, mainly the Fly, Morehead and Bensbach River systems, and can grow to a length of 15 centimetres (5.9 in).

== Habitat & biology ==
Tiger grunter adults live a demersal lifestyle in tropical swampy lagoons, backwaters and main channels of turbid rivers. Eggs are guarded by males through the use of fanning.

== Conservation ==
The tiger grunter faces threats such as commercial development, fishing, invasive species (Such as tilapia, snakeheads, rusa deer and common water hycinth), droughts, fires, mining and pollution. Its current population is unknown and is likely declining from the threats it faces. Backwater environments are less likely affected from surrounding pollution compared to mainstream rivers. No current conservation efforts have been made so far, although its range in the Bensbach River overlaps with the Tonda Wildlife Management protected area. The tiger grunter has been classified as 'Least concern' by the IUCN Red List, and more research is required to fully determine its current population and impact from threats.
