= Bidyanus welchi =

Conservation status
- Least Concern (IUCN 3.1)

Scientific classification
- Kingdom: Animalia
- Phylum: Chordata
- Class: Actinopterygii
- Division: Teleostei
- Order: Centrarchiformes
- Family: Terapontidae
- Genus: Bidyanus
- Species: B. welchi

Binomial name
- Bidyanus welchi (McCulloch & Waite, 1917)

Synonyms
- Therapon welchi McCulloch & Waite, 1917; Datnia elliptica Richardson, 1848

Species of fish

Bidyanus welchi, commonly known as Welch's grunter, black bream, or silver bream, is a species of freshwater ray-finned fish from the family Terapontidae native to Australia.

== Description ==
Bidyanus welchi has an elongate, oblong to ovate, slender, slightly compressed body. The back and underparts have evenly arched profiles with the dorsal profile being straight from the snout to the back of the head and it then becomes convex from there to the start of the dorsal fin. The profile of the lower edge of the body is evenly arched to pelvic fin and is the then straight as far as the anus. The dorsal fin is continuous with the spiny part arched and containing 12 spines, the first of which is the shortest and the 5th or 6th being the longest; they decrease in height until the last one which is still longer than the longest dorsal soft rays. There are 11–12 soft rays in the posterior part of the dorsal fin. The anal fin has three spines and eight to nine soft rays. The caudal fin is emarginate. The overall colour of the body is yellowish or brownish darkening dorsally. The colour on the body is dusky, with every scale having a spot of darker colour along its edge and on the caudal peduncle, these spots sometimes coalesce to create irregular, horizontal, fine bars. The fins on the body have a dusky membrane. The caudal fin is dusky at its base and the pelvic fins have a slight dusky colour while the pectoral fins are colourless. The maximum standard length is 40 centimetres (16 in) although the common standard length is 23 centimetres (9.1 in).

== Distribution ==
Bidyanus welchi is endemic to Australia where it occurs in some internal drainage basins in central Australia; these include the Barcoo River, Diamantina River and Georgina River in Queensland and in the Lake Eyre drainage system in South Australia.

== Habitat and biology ==
Bidyanus welchi are found in turbid water in slow flowing rivers and waterholes. They can tolerate high salinities and high temperatures. It is a carnivorous species which preys on smaller fishes as well as crustacea and worms. Spawning takes place in the summer when the watercourses it inhabits flood. The eggs are pelagic and are laid upstream after the fish migrate there, they hatch after around 30 hours. The male guards and fans the eggs. They attain sexual maturity when they reach a length of about 24–28 centimetres (9.4–11.0 in). A female of length 28 centimetres (11 in) may lay up to 100,000 eggs.

== Fisheries ==
Bidyanus welchi is one of the few good species for angling found in the arid interior of the Australia. This makes it prone to illegal fishing. At least in Queensland there are bag limits in place.

== Taxonomy and etymology ==
Bidyanus welchi was first formally described in 1917 as Therapon welchi by Allan Riverstone McCulloch and Edgar Ravenswood Waite. Gilbert Percy Whitley named the genus Bidyanus in 1943 and used a local aboriginal word bidyan which means "fish". The specific name honours the explorer Edwin Welch (1838-1916).
