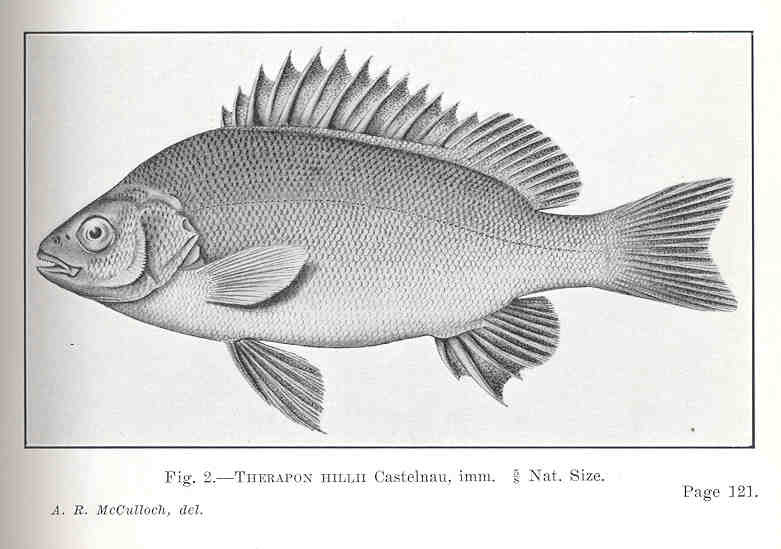

Conservation status
- Near Threatened (IUCN 3.1)

Scientific classification
- Kingdom: Animalia
- Phylum: Chordata
- Class: Actinopterygii
- Division: Teleostei
- Order: Centrarchiformes
- Family: Terapontidae
- Genus: Scortum
- Species: S. hillii

Binomial name
- Scortum hillii (Castelnau, 1878)

Synonyms
- Therapon hillii Castelnau, 1878; Scortum ogilbyi Whitley, 1951

= Leathery grunter =

Species of ray-finned fish

The leathery grunter (Scortum hillii) is a species of ray-finned fish in the family Terapontidae. It is endemic to Queensland (Australia). The eggs are fanned and guarded by the male parent.
