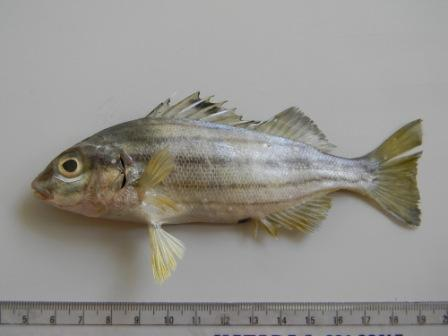

Conservation status
- Least Concern (IUCN 3.1)

Scientific classification
- Kingdom: Animalia
- Phylum: Chordata
- Class: Actinopterygii
- Order: Centrarchiformes
- Family: Terapontidae
- Genus: Pelates
- Species: P. quadrilineatus

Binomial name
- Pelates quadrilineatus (Bloch, 1790)

Synonyms
- Grammistes quadrivittatus Bloch & Schneider, 1801; Pelates quadrilineatus Cuvier in Cuvier & Valenciennes, 1829; Therapon xanthurus Cuvier in Cuvier & Valenciennes, 1829; Therapon cuvieri Bleeker, 1854; Helotes polytaenia Bleeker, 1854

= Pelates quadrilineatus =

Species of fish

Pelates quadrilineatus, also known as the trumpeter perch or fourlined terapon, is a species of ray-finned fish in the family Terapontidae, the grunters. It occurs in the western Indo-Pacific region, and also in the eastern Mediterranean Sea, having arrived there by passing through the Suez Canal.

== Description ==
This fish grows to a maximum standard length of 15 cm (6 in), but a more usual length is 8 to 10 cm (3 to 4 in). The jaws are of equal length and the mouth slopes obliquely downward; the front row of teeth are large and flattened, and are tipped with brown. The body is laterally compressed and moderately deep. The dorsal fin has twelve or thirteen spines and nine to eleven soft rays. The anal fin has three spines and nine to ten soft rays. The colour is silvery with four to six dark longitudinal stripes which do not extend onto the caudal fin. There may be a dark patch behind the head and another in front of the dorsal fin. The caudal fin may be either pale or dusky.

== Distribution and habitat ==
Pelates quadrilineatus is native to the western Indo-Pacific region. Its range extends from the eastern coast of Africa and the Red Sea to northern Australia, New Guinea and Japan. The species also reached the eastern Mediterranean Sea probably via the Suez Canal.

It occurs on reefs in coastal waters at depths down to about 20 m (70 ft), often in estuaries and brackish water. The juveniles also occur in seagrass meadows and among mangroves.

== Ecology ==
Pelates quadrilineatus is a schooling fish and a predator, feeding on invertebrates and small fishes. When removed from the water it makes a croaking sound. The male fish gives parental care to the eggs, guarding them and fanning them to keep them well oxygenated.
