= Hephaestus habbemai =

Conservation status
- Least Concern (IUCN 3.1)

Scientific classification
- Kingdom: Animalia
- Phylum: Chordata
- Class: Actinopterygii
- Order: Centrarchiformes
- Family: Terapontidae
- Genus: Hephaestus
- Species: H. habbemai

Binomial name
- Hephaestus habbemai (M. C. W. Weber, 1910)

Synonyms
- Therapon habbemai Weber 1910

Species of ray-finned fish

Hephaestus habbemai, the mountain grunter, is a species of freshwater ray-finned fish, a grunter from the family Terapontidae. It is found in New Guinea.

== Habitat ==
The adult fish inhabit the cobble and gravel bottom streams and the deep pools below rapids and waterfalls.

== Breeding behavior ==
The males guard and fan the eggs.

== Size ==
This species reaches a length of 15.0 cm (5.9 in).
