= Long-nose sooty grunter =

Conservation status
- Vulnerable (IUCN 3.1)

Scientific classification
- Kingdom: Animalia
- Phylum: Chordata
- Class: Actinopterygii
- Order: Centrarchiformes
- Family: Terapontidae
- Genus: Hephaestus
- Species: H. epirrhinos

Binomial name
- Hephaestus epirrhinos Vari & Hutchins, 1978

Species of fish

The long-nose sooty grunter (Hephaestus epirrhinos) is a species of fish in the family Terapontidae. It is endemic to Australia.

== Description ==
The long-nose sooty grunter is a large elongate species with a distinctively long, slightly concave snout. It has an overall dark greenish-grey body, with scales which have broad blackish margins and golden to bronze centres. The juveniles are overall greenish with irregular vermiculations on the upper flanks and the caudal peduncle. The largest recorded standard length is 42 centimetres (17 in).

== Distribution ==
The long-nose sooty grunter is endemic to the eastern part of Kimberley region in Western Australia, where it has been recorded from the Drysdale River and from King Edward River.

== Habitat and biology ==
The long-nose sooty grunter is a freshwater species, and as adults they prefer deep pools of slow flowing rivers. It is frequently recorded in the vicinity of snags and overhanging vegetation. They may also be found in the deeper sections of riffles. The juveniles are usually observed in shallow riffles and slower flowing stretches of river.

This is a carnivorous species, and its diet comprises aquatic insects, crustaceans and fish, although they have been recorded feeding on terrestrial vertebrates and invertebrates.

Sexual maturity is attained at lengths of around 12 centimetres (4.7 in). It is thought that the females lay demersal eggs which are guarded and fanned by the males.

== Species description ==
The long-nose sooty grunter was first formally described by Richard P. Vari of the National Museum of Natural History and J. Barry Hutchins of Western Australia Museum in 1978, with the type locality given as the Drysdale River.
