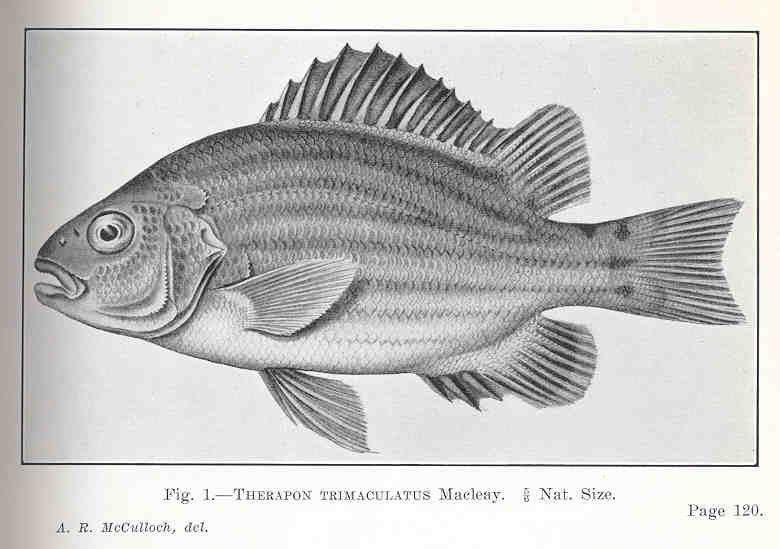

Conservation status
- Vulnerable (IUCN 3.1)

Scientific classification
- Kingdom: Animalia
- Phylum: Chordata
- Class: Actinopterygii
- Order: Centrarchiformes
- Family: Terapontidae
- Genus: Hephaestus
- Species: H. trimaculatus

Binomial name
- Hephaestus trimaculatus (Macleay, 1883)

Synonyms
- Therapon trimaculatus Macleay, 1883

= Threespot grunter =

Species of ray-finned fish

The threespot grunter (Hephaestus trimaculatus) is a species of freshwater ray-finned fish in the family Terapontidae. It is endemic to Papua New Guinea, where it is found only in the Laloki River near Port Moresby living in rock pools in the lower part of the river. The eggs are guarded and fanned by the male.
