= Midgley's grunter =

Conservation status
- Least Concern (IUCN 3.1)

Scientific classification
- Kingdom: Animalia
- Phylum: Chordata
- Class: Actinopterygii
- Order: Centrarchiformes
- Family: Terapontidae
- Genus: Pingalla
- Species: P. midgleyi

Binomial name
- Pingalla midgleyi Allen & Merrick, 1984

Species of ray-finned fish

Pingalla midgleyi is a species of ray-finned fish in the family Terapontidae known by the common names black-blotch grunter and Midgley's grunter. It is endemic to the Northern Territory of Australia, where it occurs in the Alligator, Katherine, and Daly River systems. It is a resident of Kakadu National Park.
