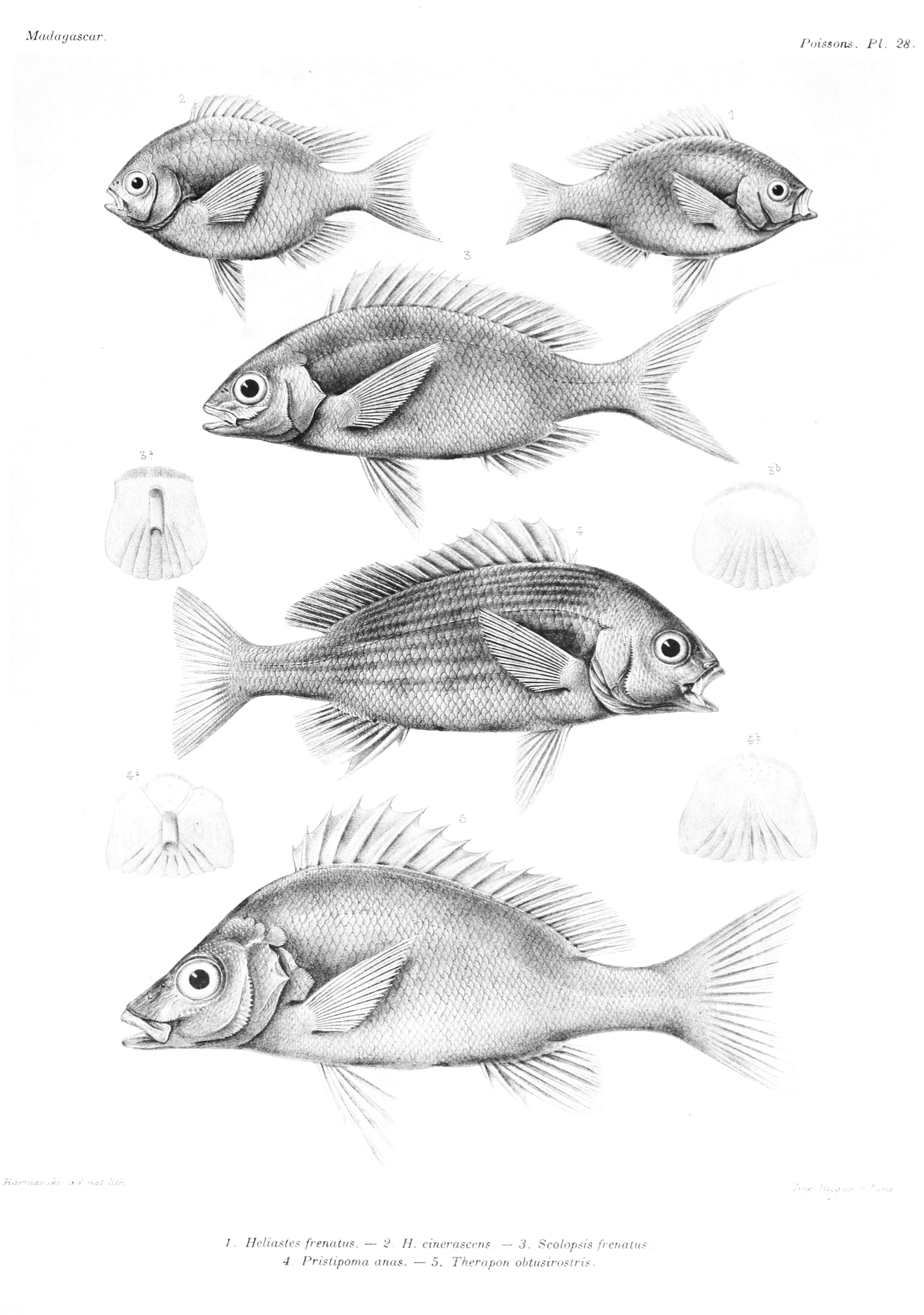
- The creature at the bottom is Therapon obtusirostris OR Mesopristes elongatus

Conservation status
- Data Deficient (IUCN 3.1)

Scientific classification
- Kingdom: Animalia
- Phylum: Chordata
- Class: Actinopterygii
- Order: Centrarchiformes
- Family: Terapontidae
- Genus: Mesopristes
- Species: M. elongatus

Binomial name
- Mesopristes elongatus (Guichenot, 1866)

Synonyms
- Datnia elongata Guichenot, 1866; Datnia obtusirostris Guichenot, 1866; Mesopristis elongatus (Guichenot, 1866); Terapon elongatus (Guichenot, 1866); Terapon lambertoni (Fowler, 1923); Therapon elongatus (Guichenot, 1866); Therapon lambertoni Fowler, 1923; Therapon obtusirostris (Guichenot, 1866)

= Mesopristes elongatus =

Species of ray-finned fish

Mesopristes elongatus is a species of ray-finned fish in the family Terapontidae known by the common name plain terapon. It is endemic to Madagascar, where it occurs in several rivers along the eastern coast. Its populations are thought to be decreasing due to habitat loss and degradation, which is accelerated by the siltation caused by deforestation.

This is a freshwater fish that sometimes enters estuaries. It is caught for food, and may be sold in local markets.
