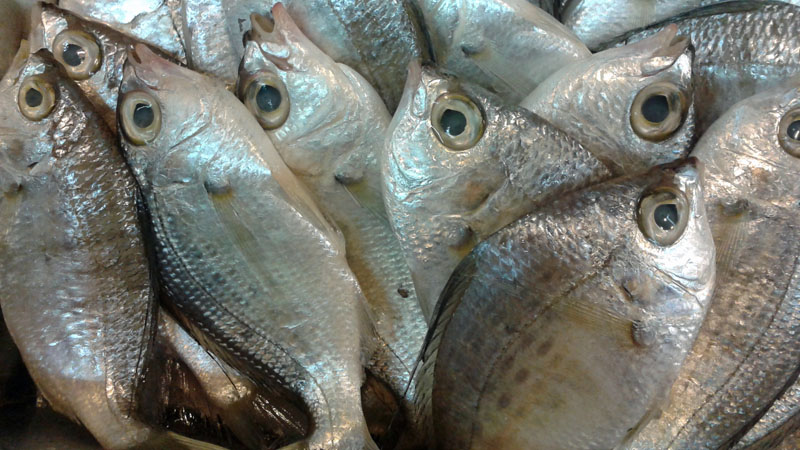
- Leiopotherapon plumbeus being sold in a Philippine market.

Scientific classification
- Kingdom: Animalia
- Phylum: Chordata
- Class: Actinopterygii
- Order: Centrarchiformes
- Family: Terapontidae
- Genus: Leiopotherapon
- Species: L. plumbeus

Binomial name
- Leiopotherapon plumbeus (Kner, 1864)

Synonyms
- Datnia plumbea Kner, 1864

= Leiopotherapon plumbeus =

Species of ray-finned fish

Leiopotherapon plumbeus, known commonly as the silver perch, is a species of ray-finned fish in the family Terapontidae, the grunters. It is endemic to the Philippines, where it is called ayungin, bugaong, bigaong, and bagaong.

== Description ==
This species reaches 16 centimeters in maximum length.

== Behavior ==
The species exhibits paternal care, as the male guards and tends the eggs.

== Uses ==
The fish is caught and consumed locally as food. It is considered to be one of the most delicious of the native freshwater fish in the Philippines. The supply has run thin due to overharvesting, and it is now rare in markets, making it quite expensive.

The fish is also used to feed ducks.

== Conservation ==
Populations have declined due to overfishing. In 1991 it was the most abundant fish in Laguna de Bay, the largest lake in the Philippines; by 2002 it was the third most abundant. Sedimentation and pollution contribute to the population drop in the lake.

The fish is being reared in captive breeding projects, in which it grows well on a diet of prawn food and tubifex worms. It is dosed with hormones to induce spawning.

== Gallery ==
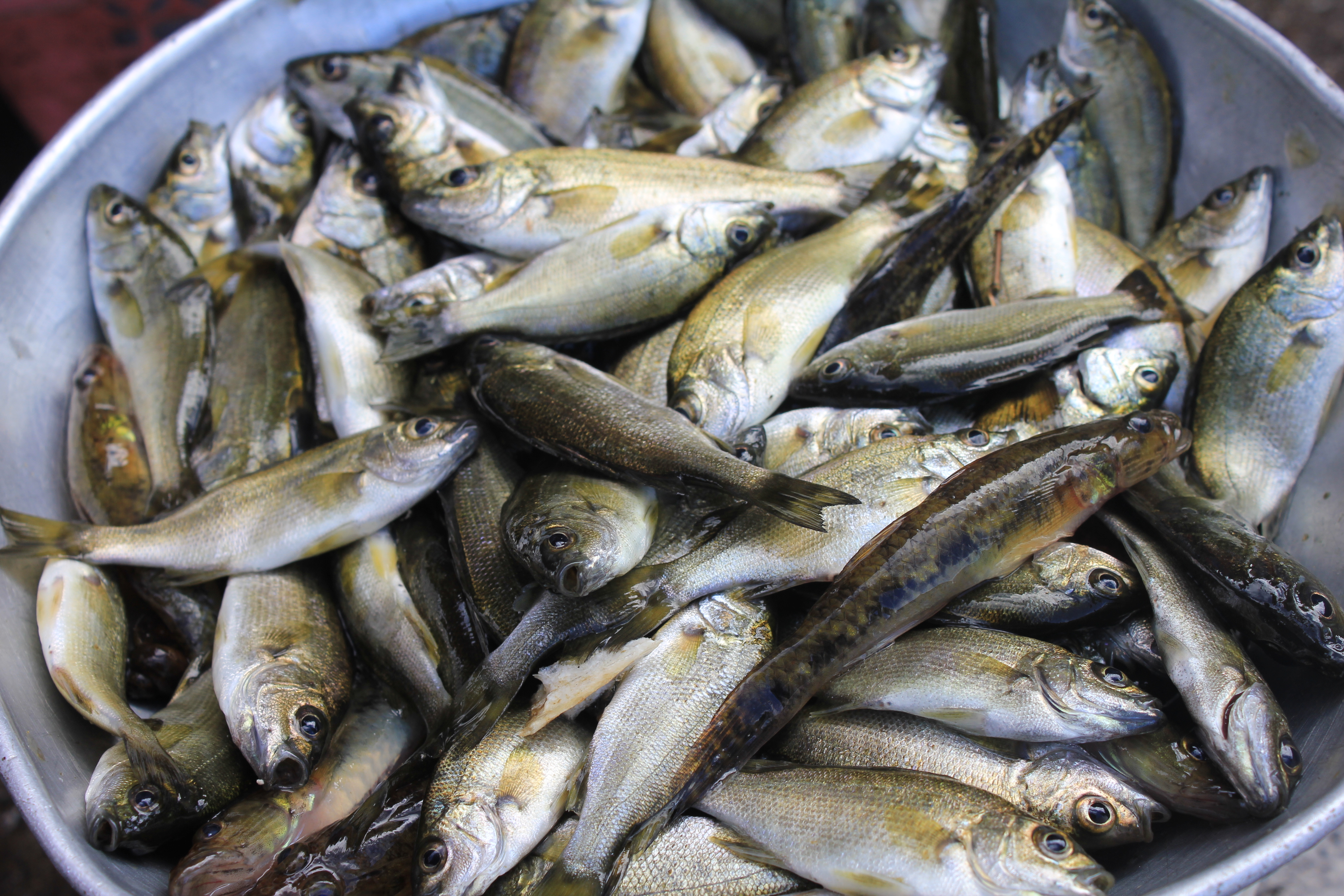
Ayungin found in Lake Buhi, Camarines Sur.

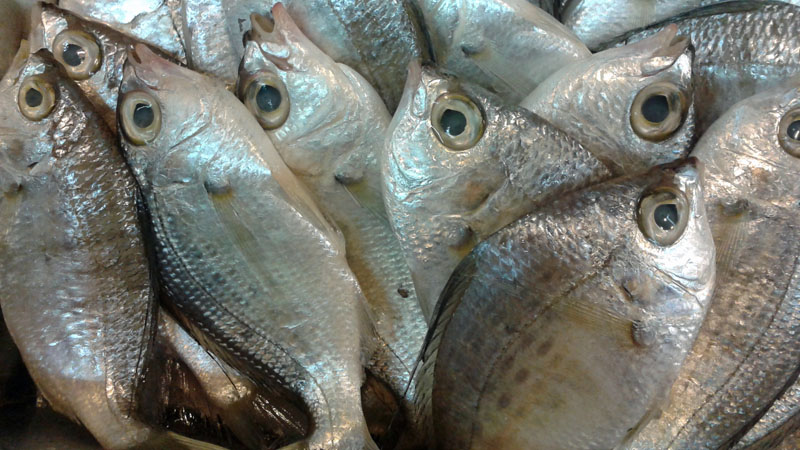
This species, known locally as 'ayungin', is a common food fish in the country.
