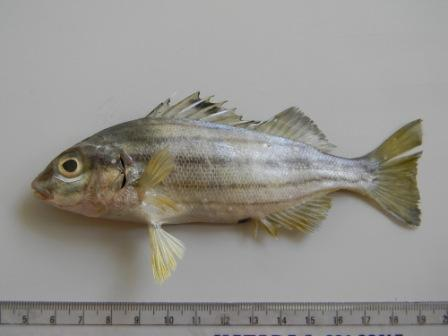
- Pelates quadrilineatus

Scientific classification
- Kingdom: Animalia
- Phylum: Chordata
- Class: Actinopterygii
- Division: Teleostei
- Order: Centrarchiformes
- Family: Terapontidae
- Genus: Pelates; Cuvier, 1829

Type species
- Pelates quadrilineatus (Cuvier, 1829)

= Pelates =

Genus of ray-finned fishes

Pelates, is a genus of ray-finned fish in the family Terapontidae, containing 3 species.

== Species ==
Species	Common name	Image
Pelates octolineatus (Jenyns, 1840)	eight-lined trumpeter	
Pelates qinglanensis (Sun, 1991)		
Pelates quadrilineatus (Bloch, 1790)	four-line trumpeter	

The Eastern striped grunter (Helotes sexlineatus) is sometimes placed in the genus Pelates.
