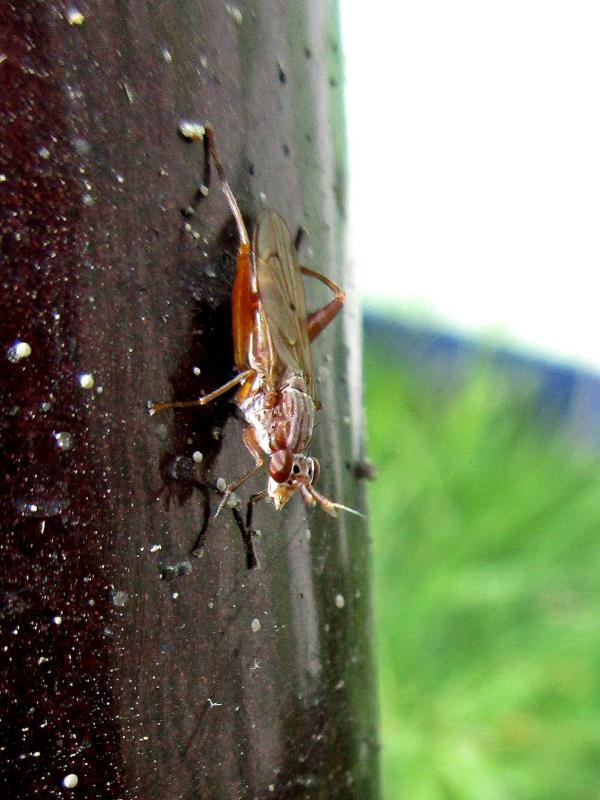
- Sepedon spinipes Netherlands

Scientific classification
- Kingdom: Animalia
- Phylum: Arthropoda
- Class: Insecta
- Order: Diptera
- Family: Sciomyzidae
- Genus: Sepedon
- Species: S. spinipes

Binomial name
- Sepedon spinipes (Scopoli, 1763)

Synonyms
- Sepedon haeffneri Fallén, 1820; Musca spinipes Scopoli, 1763

= Sepedon spinipes =

Species of fly

Sepedon spinipes is a species of fly (insects in the family Sciomyzidae). It is found in the Palearctic
