= Sepedon pacifica =

Scientific classification
- Kingdom: Animalia
- Phylum: Arthropoda
- Class: Insecta
- Order: Diptera
- Family: Sciomyzidae
- Genus: Sepedon
- Species: S. pacifica

Binomial name
- Sepedon pacifica Cresson, 1914

Species of fly

Sepedon pacifica is a species of marsh fly.
