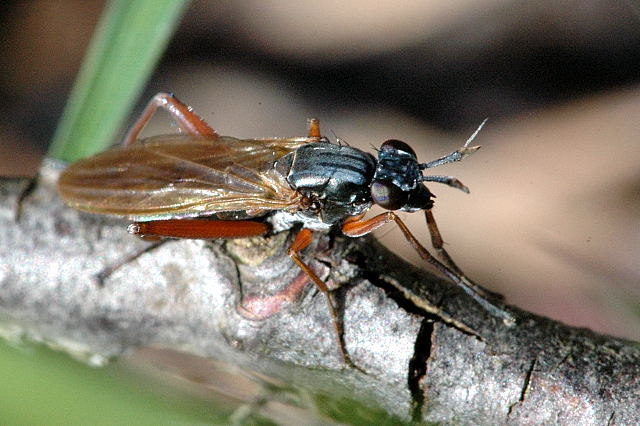
- Sepedon sphegea

Scientific classification
- Domain: Eukaryota
- Kingdom: Animalia
- Phylum: Arthropoda
- Class: Insecta
- Order: Diptera
- Family: Sciomyzidae
- Tribe: Tetanocerini
- Genus: Sepedon; Latreille, 1804

Type species
- Syrphus sphegeus Fabricius, 1775

Synonyms
- Acolasta Swinderen, 1822

= Sepedon =

Genus of flies

Sepedon is a genus of flies in the family Sciomyzidae, the marsh flies or snail-killing flies.

== Species ==
- Subgenus Mesosepedon Verbeke, 1950

- S. convergens Loew, 1862
- S. dispersa Verbeke, 1950
- S. ethiopica Steyskal, 1956
- S. pleuritica Loew, 1862
- S. schoutedeni Verbeke, 1950
- S. tuckeri Barraclough, 1985

- Subgenus Parasepedon Verbeke, 1950

- S. acrosticta Verbeke, 1956
- S. albocostata Verbeke, 1950
- S. edwardsi Steyskal, 1956
- S. iris Verbeke, 1961
- S. ituriensis Verbeke, 1950
- S. katangensis Verbeke, 1950
- S. knutsoni Vala, Gbedjissi & Dossou, 1994
- S. lippensi Verbeke, 1950
- S. maculifemur Verbeke, 1950
- S. madecassa Verbeke, 1961
- S. magerae Verbeke, 1950
- S. monacha Verbeke, 1961
- S. nanoides Verbeke, 1950
- S. neavei Steyskal, 1956
- S. notambe Speiser, 1910
- S. ochripes Verbeke, 1950
- S. ophiolimnes Steyskal, 1956
- S. ornatifrons Adams, 1905
- S. paranana Verbeke, 1950
- S. pelex Steyskal, 1956
- S. ruficeps Becker, 1922
- S. saegeri Verbeke, 1950
- S. scapularis Adams, 1903
- S. selenopa Verbeke, 1961
- S. senegalensis Macquart, 1843
- S. simulans Verbeke, 1950
- S. straeleni Verbeke, 1963
- S. stuckenbergi Verbeke, 1961
- S. testacea Loew, 1862
- S. trichooscelis Speiser, 1910
- S. trochanterina Verbeke, 1950
- S. uelensis Verbeke, 1950
- S. violacea Hendel, 1909

- Subgenus Sepedomyia Verbeke, 1950

- S. nasuta Verbeke, 1950

- Subgenus Sepedon Latreille, 1804

- S. aenescens Wiedemann, 1830
- S. sphegea (Fabricius, 1775)
- S. spinipes (Scopoli, 1763)

- Unplaced

- S. americana Steyskal, 1951
- S. anchista Steyskal, 1956
- S. armipes Loew, 1859
- S. batjanensis Brunetti, 1907
- S. bifida Steyskal, 1951
- S. borealis Steyskal, 1951
- S. capellei Fisher & Orth, 1969
- S. cascadensis Fisher & Orth, 1974
- S. chalybeifrons Meijere, 1908
- S. costalis Walker, 1858
- S. crishna Walker, 1849
- S. femorata Knutson & Orth, 1984
- S. ferruginosa Wiedemann, 1824
- S. floridensis Steyskal, 1951
- S. fuscipennis Loew, 1859
- S. gracilicornis Orth, 1986
- S. hecate Elberg, Rozkošný & Knutson, 2009
- S. hispanica Loew, 1862
- S. lata Bezzi, 1928
- S. lobifera Hendel, 1911
- S. mcphersoni Knutson & Orth, 2001
- S. melanderi Steyskal, 1951
- S. neanias Hendel, 1913
- S. neili Steyskal, 1951
- S. noteoi Steyskal, 1980
- S. pacifica Cresson, 1914
- S. plumbella Wiedemann, 1830
- S. praemiosa Giglio-Tos, 1893
- S. pseudarmipes Fisher & Orth, 1969
- S. pusilla Loew, 1859
- S. relicta Wulp, 1897
- S. senex Wiedemann, 1830
- S. spangleri Beaver, 1974
- S. tenuicornis Cresson, 1920
