= Hephaestus (fish) =

- Hephaestus jenkinsi

Scientific classification
- Kingdom: Animalia
- Phylum: Chordata
- Class: Actinopterygii
- Division: Teleostei
- Order: Centrarchiformes
- Family: Terapontidae
- Genus: Hephaestus de Vis, 1884

Type species
- Hephaestus tulliensis De Vis, 1884

Synonyms
- Archeria Nichols, 1949; Archerichthys Whitley, 1951

Genus of ray-finned fishes

Hephaestus is a genus of freshwater ray-finned fish, grunters from the family Terapontidae.

== Species ==
The following species are classified within the genus:

- Hephaestus adamsoni (Trewavas, 1940) (Adamson's grunter)
- Hephaestus carbo (J. D. Ogilby & McCulloch, 1916) (Coal grunter)
- Hephaestus epirrhinos Vari & Hutchins, 1978 (Longnose sooty grunter)
- Hephaestus fuliginosus (Macleay, 1883) (Sooty grunter)
- Hephaestus habbemai (M. C. W. Weber, 1910) (Mountain grunter)
- Hephaestus jenkinsi (Whitley, 1945) (Western sooty grunter)
- Hephaestus komaensis Allen & Jebb, 1993
- Hephaestus lineatus Allen, 1984 (Lined grunter)
- Hephaestus obtusifrons (Mees & Kailola, 1977)
- Hephaestus raymondi (Mees & Kailola, 1977) (Raymond's grunter)
- Hephaestus roemeri (M. C. W. Weber, 1910) (Röemer's grunter)
- Hephaestus transmontanus (Mees & Kailola, 1977) (Sepik grunter)
- Hephaestus trimaculatus (Macleay, 1883) (Threespot grunter)
- Hephaestus tulliensis De Vis, 1884 (Khaki grunter)
