= Sepedon tenuicornis =

Scientific classification
- Domain: Eukaryota
- Kingdom: Animalia
- Phylum: Arthropoda
- Class: Insecta
- Order: Diptera
- Family: Sciomyzidae
- Genus: Sepedon
- Species: S. tenuicornis

Binomial name
- Sepedon tenuicornis Cresson, 1920

Species of fly

Sepedon tenuicornis is a species of marsh fly (insects in the family Sciomyzidae).
