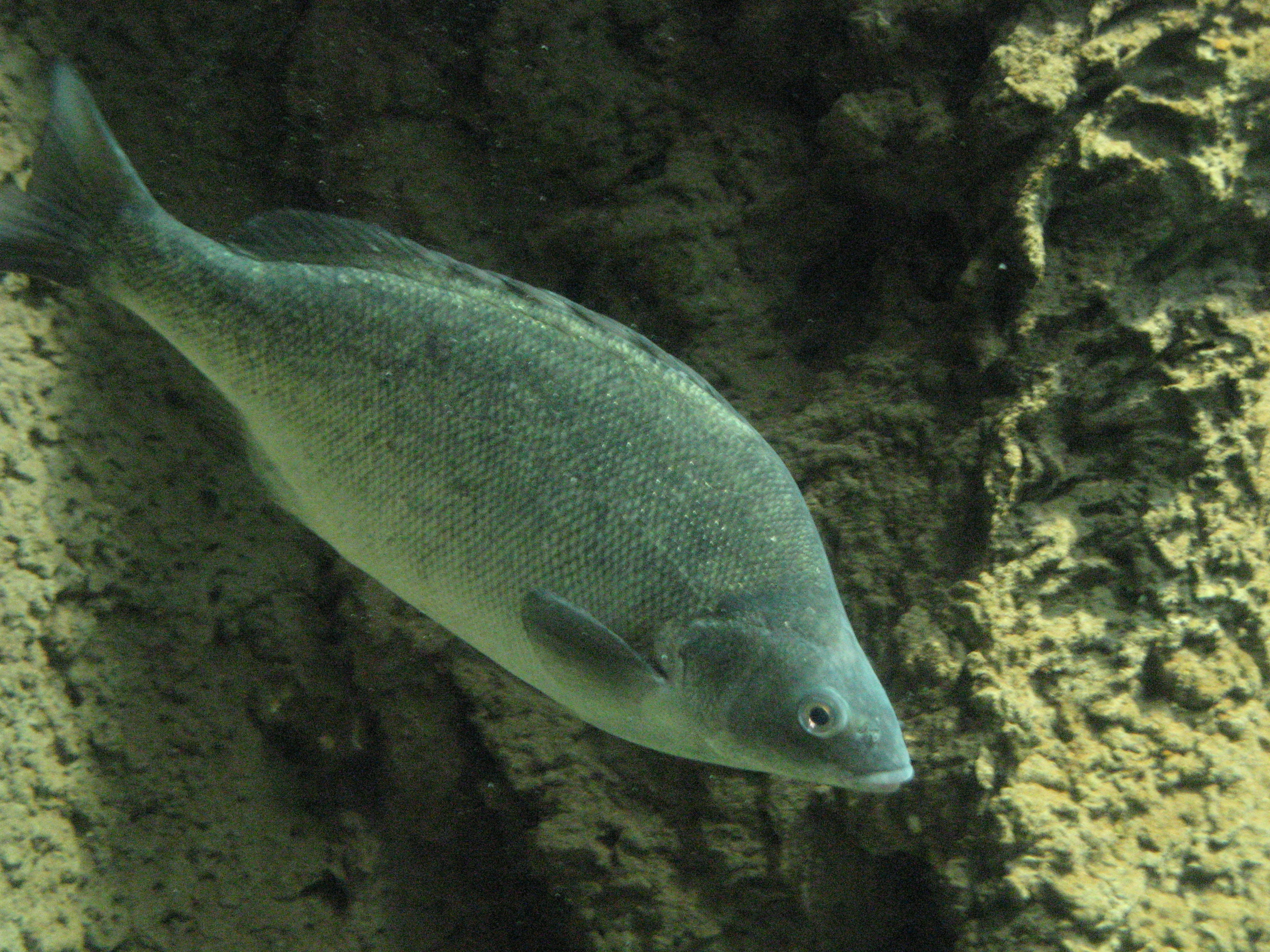
- Bidyanus bidyanus

Scientific classification
- Kingdom: Animalia
- Phylum: Chordata
- Class: Actinopterygii
- Order: Centrarchiformes
- Family: Terapontidae
- Genus: Bidyanus; Whitley, 1943

Type species
- Acerina (Cernua) bidyana Mitchell, 1838

= Bidyanus =

Genus of ray-finned fishes

Bidyanus is a genus of ray-finned fishes, from the family Terapontidae, the grunters and tigerperches. They are freshwater species which are endemic to Australia.

== Species ==
There are two species in the genus Bidyanus:

- Bidyanus bidyanus (Mitchell, 1838) (silver perch)
- Bidyanus welchi (McCulloch & Waite, 1917) (Welch's grunter)
