= Terapon =

- Terapon jarbua

Scientific classification
- Kingdom: Animalia
- Phylum: Chordata
- Class: Actinopterygii
- Division: Teleostei
- Order: Centrarchiformes
- Family: Terapontidae
- Genus: Terapon; Cuvier, 1815

Type species
- Holocentrus servus Bloch, 1790

Species
- see text

Synonyms
- Therapon Cloquet, 1819

Genus of ray-finned fishes

Terapon, also known as the grunters or trumpeters is a genus of ray-finned fish in the family Terapontidae, the grunters.

== Etymology ==
An unjustified emendation that has appeared in the literature is Therapon. It was introduced in 1819 since "Terapon" was perceived as an incorrect rendering of the Greek word therapon. In fact, the intended etymology was Greek: teras = "strange thing, monster, wonder" (cf. teratosaurus) + Greek: pontios = "marine", pertaining to the sea.

== Species ==
There are three species in the genus Terapon:

- Terapon jarbua Fabricius, 1775 (Jarbua terapon)
- Terapon puta Cuvier, 1829 (Small-scaled terapon)
- Terapon theraps Cuvier, 1829 (Largescaled terapon)
