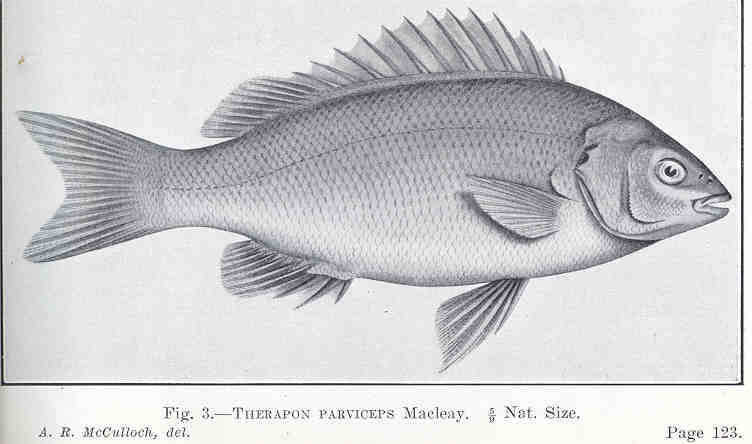
- Scortum parviceps

Scientific classification
- Kingdom: Animalia
- Phylum: Chordata
- Class: Actinopterygii
- Order: Centrarchiformes
- Family: Terapontidae
- Genus: Scortum; Whitley, 1943

Type species
- Therapon parviceps Macleay, 1883

Species
- 4, see text

= Scortum =

Genus of ray-finned fishes

Scortum is a genus of Australian fresh and brackish water ray-finned fishes in the family Terapontidae, the grunters.

Species include:

- Scortum barcoo (McCulloch & Waite, 1917) (Barcoo grunter)
- Scortum hillii (Castelnau, 1878) (leathery grunter)
- Scortum neili Allen, Larson & Midgley, 1993 (Neil's grunter)
- Scortum parviceps (Macleay, 1883) (small-headed grunter)
