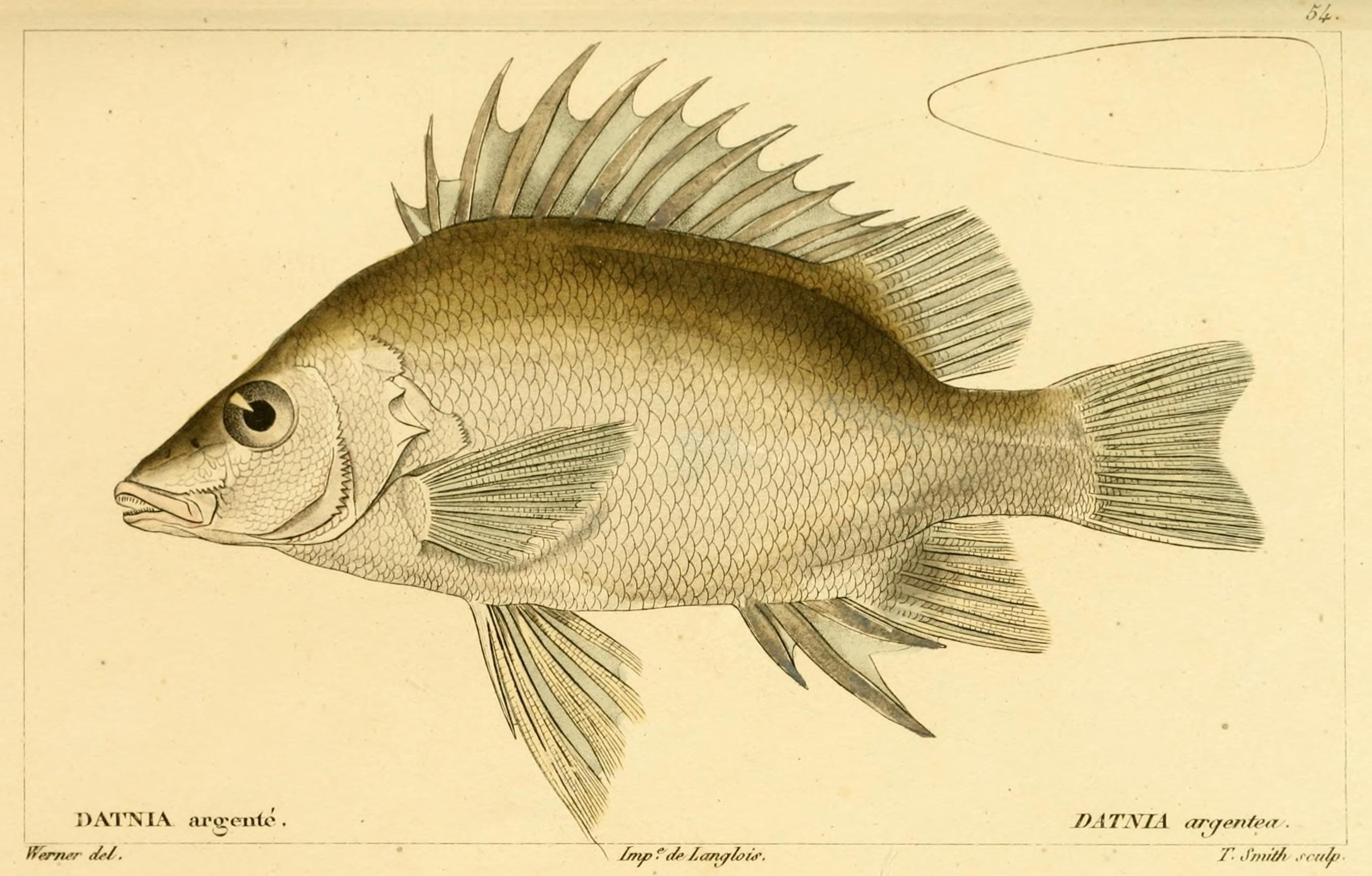
- Mesopristes argenteus

Scientific classification
- Kingdom: Animalia
- Phylum: Chordata
- Class: Actinopterygii
- Order: Centrarchiformes
- Family: Terapontidae
- Genus: Mesopristes; Bleeker, 1873

Type species
- Mesopristes macracanthus, a synonym of Datnia argentea Bleeker 1873

Species
- 5, see text

Synonyms
- Datnia Cuvier, 1829; Mesopristes Fowler, 1918

= Mesopristes =

Genus of ray-finned fishes

Mesopristes is a genus of ray-finned fish in the family Terapontidae, the grunters. They are found in fresh, brackish and marine waters near the coast in the Indo-Pacific region.

== Species ==
Species include:

- Mesopristes argenteus (Cuvier, 1829) - silver grunter
- Mesopristes cancellatus (Cuvier, 1829) - tapiroid grunter
- Mesopristes elongatus (Guichenot, 1866) - plain terapon
- Mesopristes iravi (Yoshino, Yoshigou & Senou, 2002)
- Mesopristes kneri (Bleeker, 1876) - orange-spotted therapon
