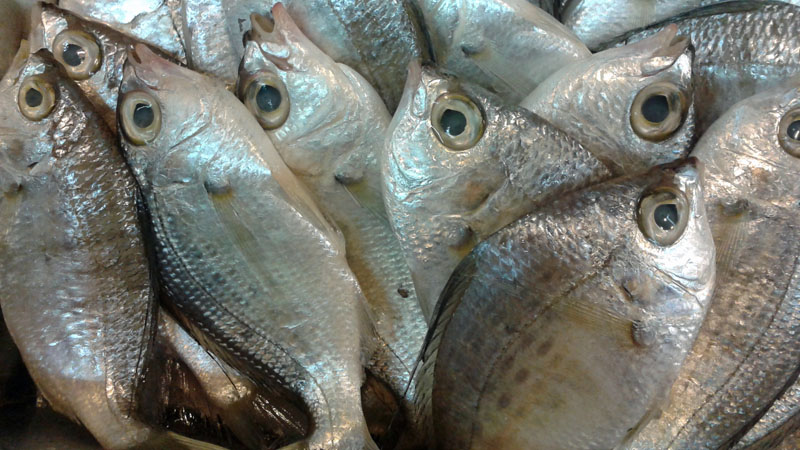
- Leiopotherapon plumbeus being sold in a Philippine market

Scientific classification
- Kingdom: Animalia
- Phylum: Chordata
- Class: Actinopterygii
- Order: Centrarchiformes
- Family: Terapontidae
- Genus: Leiopotherapon; Fowler, 1931

Type species
- Datnia plumbea Kner, 1864

Species
- 4, see text

= Leiopotherapon =

Genus of ray-finned fishes

Leiopotherapon is a genus of ray-finned fish in the family Terapontidae, the grunters. Three species are endemic to Australia, while L. plumbeus is from the Philippines. They are mainly found in fresh water, although H. unicolor also occurs in desert lakes with higher salinity.

Species include:

- Leiopotherapon aheneus (Mees, 1963) - Fortescue grunter
- Leiopotherapon macrolepis (Vari, 1978) - large-scale grunter
- Leiopotherapon plumbeus (Kner, 1864) - silver perch
- Leiopotherapon unicolor (Günther, 1859) - spangled grunter, spangled perch
