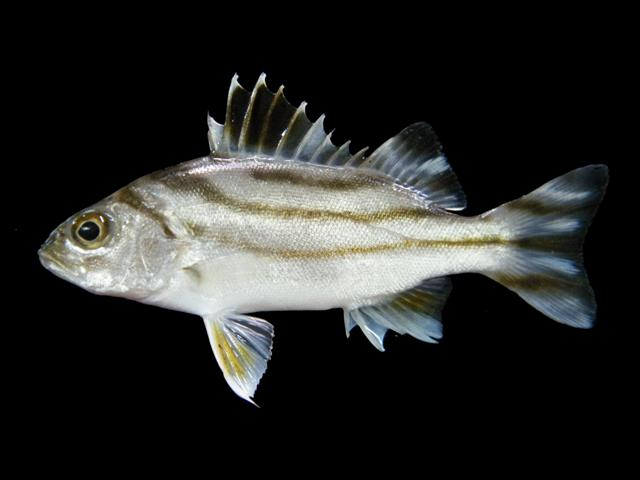

Conservation status
- Least Concern (IUCN 3.1)

Scientific classification
- Kingdom: Animalia
- Phylum: Chordata
- Class: Actinopterygii
- Division: Teleostei
- Order: Centrarchiformes
- Family: Terapontidae
- Genus: Terapon
- Species: T. jarbua

Binomial name
- Terapon jarbua (Fabricius [ex Forsskål] in Niebuhr, 1775)

Synonyms
- List: Terapon timorensis Quoy & Gaimard, 1824; Sciaena jarbua Fabricius, 1775; Holocentrus jarbua (Fabricius, 1775); Holocentrus servus Bloch, 1790; Grammistes servus (Bloch, 1790); Terapon servus (Bloch, 1790); Therapon servus (Bloch, 1790); Coius trivittatus Hamilton, 1822; Pterapon trivittatus Gray, 1846; Therapon farna Bleeker, 1879; Stereolepis inoko Schmidt, 1931

= Terapon jarbua =

Species of fish

Terapon jarbua, also known as the jarbua terapon, crescent grunter, crescent banded grunter, crescent perch, spiky trumpeter, thornfish or tiger perch, is a species of ray-finned fish, of the family Terapontidae, with a distribution in the Indo-Pacific. It is an important commercial species within its range and is sometimes found in the aquarium trade, where it is known as "target fish" for the pattern visible from above.

== Taxonomy ==
Terapon jarbua was first formally described using the Arabic name Djarbua in a draft by Peter Forsskål. The description could have been by either Forsskål or by Carsten Niebuhr but it was compiled by the Danish naturalist Johan Christian Fabricius (1745–1808). The type locality of the specimen is given as Jeddah. It was used in the combination Sciaena jarbua in Descriptiones animalium and according to the authorship rules, should correctly be stated as Fabricius [ex Forsskål] in Niebuhr, 1775. The genus Terapon was created by Georges Cuvier in 1816 and in 1876 Pieter Bleeker then designated Holocentrus servus which had been described by Marcus Elieser Bloch in 1790 as the type species of the genus, this was considered to be a junior synonym of Terapon jarbua.

Some authorities consider that the taxon currently named Terapon jarbua, which has a wide geographic range, is actually likely to be more than one species. One possible split would be between the western Indian Ocean species as originally described by Fabricius and the species Bloch described from Japan, which would be Terapon servus.

== Distribution ==
Terapon jarbua has a wide Indo-Pacific distribution which extends from the Red Sea and the coasts of eastern Africa as far south as South Africa through the Indian Ocean, including the Persian Gulf and into the Pacific Ocean as far east as Samoa. Its range extends northwards to Japan and south to the Arafura Sea and Lord Howe Island. A single specimen was reported in 2010 from the eastern Mediterranean Sea, a likely entry from the Suez Canal.

== Description ==
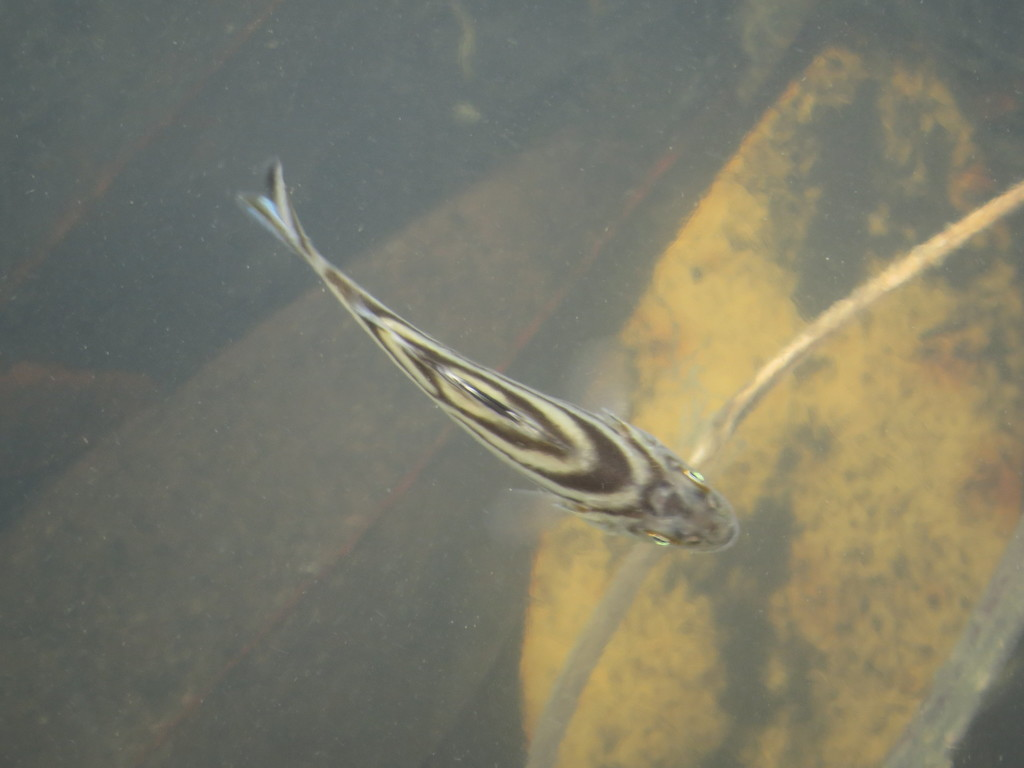
Showing distinctive concentric pattern from above, Cairns

Terapon jarbua is a medium-sized grunter with an oblong, slightly laterally compressed body. The mouth is oblique; the jaws are of equal length, and the maxilla is level with the front edge of the eye in juveniles and the centre of the eye in adults. It has conical, slightly recurved teeth which are set in bands along the jaw. The teeth in the outer rows are enlarged and are present in juveniles but not all adults. There are 11-12 spines in the dorsal fin and 9-11 rays. The spiny portion of the fin is strongly arched, with the fourth to sixth spines being the longest and most deeply notched. The anal fin has 3 spines and 7-10 soft rays while the caudal fin is emarginate. They have 75–100 pored scales in their lateral line.

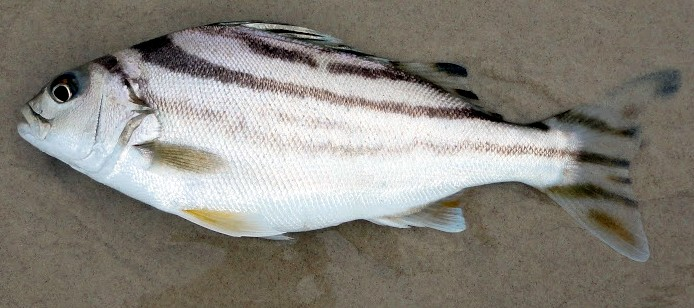
In Western Australia

They have a silvery white body lined by 3-4 curved stripes from the nape to the rear of the body with the lowest stripe bisecting the caudal fin. There is a black spot on the spines of the dorsal fin between the third and sixth spines and the tail is striped with a black tip to each lobe. This species reaches sexual maturity after attaining a total length of 13 centimetres (5.1 in). They are most commonly recorded at total lengths of around 25 centimetres (9.8 in), and the longest recorded fish was 36 centimetres (14 in).

== Habitat and biology ==
In the Philippines

Young juvenile, in Thailand
Dessicated specimen showing the teeth

Terapon jarbua is a euryhaline grunter which can tolerate a wide range of salinities from pure freshwater to up to 70% and so can live in a variety of habitats from purely marine areas through coastal waters, into estuaries, coastal lagoons and freshwater. It is mainly a marine species but it may move quite far up rivers where the water is fresh. Juveniles of T. jarbua can be numerous in intertidal areas where there are sandy and are frequently recorded in tidal pools. This is a predatory species which feeds on smaller fishes but which also acts as a cleaner fish eating ectoparasites from larger fishes and is known to eat their scales which are high in calories. The distinctive colour and small scales of T. jarbua may be an adaptation to avoid attack by its conspecifics. They will also feed on insects and other invertebrates. The juveniles have been reported as being territorial and to have excavated craters in sand, possibly helping them to keep their position as the tide ebbs and flows. The young fish between standard lengths of 2 and 5 centimetres (0.79 and 1.97 in) are gregarious but become territorial between 9 and 15 centimetres (3.5 and 5.9 in). They can produce sounds using extrinsic muscles on the swimbladder which have been shown to be used for communication and that these sounds change both as the fish mature and with changes to the fish's environment. Although these fish have been reported as juveniles and adults in freshwater, reproduction takes place in the marine environment.

== Fisheries ==
Terapon jarbua is fished using all types of inshore fishing gear, including gillnets, traps, handlines and bottom trawls. These fish are sold fresh or in a dried and salted form. This species is infrequently available in the aquarium trade.

== Gallery ==
In the Philippines

In Fiji

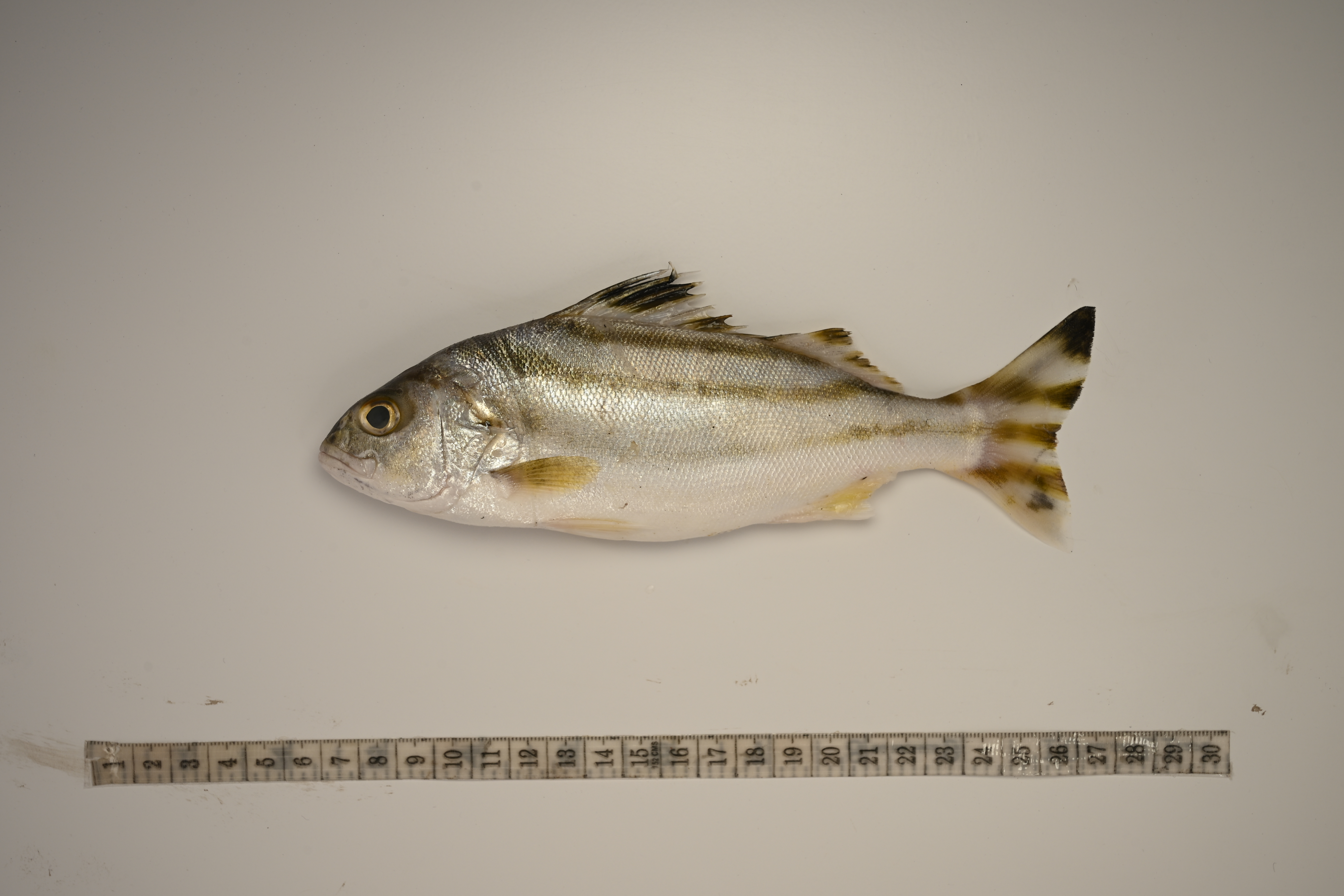
With ruler for scale
