= Pingalla =

- P. midgleyi

Scientific classification
- Kingdom: Animalia
- Phylum: Chordata
- Class: Actinopterygii
- Division: Teleostei
- Order: Centrarchiformes
- Family: Terapontidae
- Genus: Pingalla; Whitley, 1955

Type species
- Pingalla gilberti Whitley, 1955

Species
- 3, see text

Genus of ray-finned fishes

Pingalla is a genus of freshwater ray-finned fish in the family Terapontidae. These fish are native to northern Australia, but one species is also known from New Guinea.

== Species ==
Species include:

- Pingalla gilberti (Whitley, 1955) - Gilbert's grunter
- Pingalla lorentzi (Weber, 1910) - Lorentz's grunter
- Pingalla midgleyi (Allen & Merrick, 1984) - black-blotch grunter
