= Amniataba =

- Amniataba percoides

Scientific classification
- Kingdom: Animalia
- Phylum: Chordata
- Class: Actinopterygii
- Division: Teleostei
- Order: Centrarchiformes
- Family: Terapontidae
- Genus: Amniataba; Whitley, 1943

Type species
- Therapon percoides Günther, 1864

Species
- See text

Genus of ray-finned fishes

Amniataba is a genus of ray-finned fish in the family Terapontidae, that includes three species, with two being found in Oceania, and one in the Western Central Pacific.

== Species ==
Species	Common name	Image
Amniataba affinis (Mees & Kailola, 1977)	tiger grunter	
Amniataba caudavittata (Richardson, 1845)	yellowtail trumpeter	
Amniataba percoides (Günther, 1864)	barred grunter	
