= Sepedon armipes =

Scientific classification
- Domain: Eukaryota
- Kingdom: Animalia
- Phylum: Arthropoda
- Class: Insecta
- Order: Diptera
- Family: Sciomyzidae
- Genus: Sepedon
- Species: S. armipes

Binomial name
- Sepedon armipes Loew, 1859

Species of fly

Sepedon armipes is a species of marsh fly (insects in the family Sciomyzidae).
