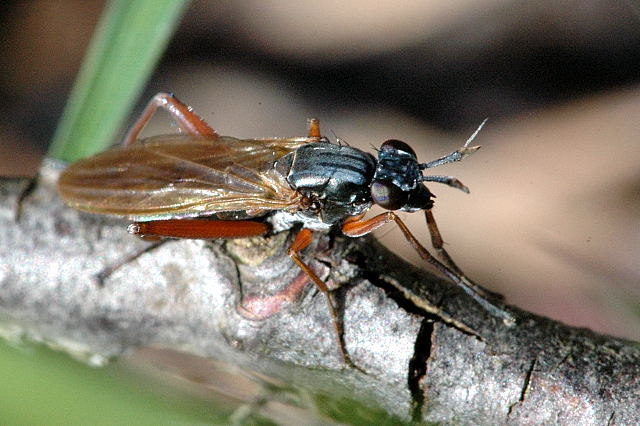
- Sepedon sphegea

Scientific classification
- Kingdom: Animalia
- Phylum: Arthropoda
- Clade: Pancrustacea
- Class: Insecta
- Order: Diptera
- Family: Sciomyzidae
- Genus: Sepedon
- Species: S. sphegea

Binomial name
- Sepedon sphegea (Fabricius, 1775)

Synonyms
- Sepedon palustris Latreille, 1809; Musca sphegea Fabricius, 1775; Musca simulator Harris, 1903

= Sepedon sphegea =

Species of fly

Sepedon sphegea is a Palearctic species of fly in the family Sciomyzidae, the marsh flies or snail-killing flies. The larva feeds on aquatic snails and as an opportunist on other invertebrates. The habitat of this species includes among many others, pond margins and damp meadows. It has a particular fondness for Iris pseudacorus which grow at the edges of the pond. Adults can be found all year long but the main flight period is from March to October.

Sepedon sphegea feeding on a larva of a dragonfly
