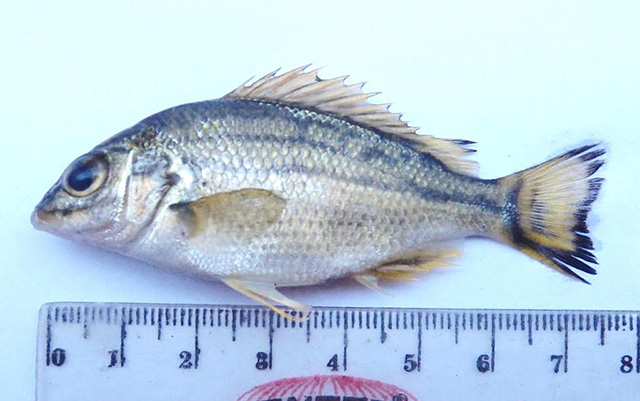
- Lagusia micracanthus Indonesia, Pattunuang River, Sulawesi

Scientific classification
- Kingdom: Animalia
- Phylum: Chordata
- Class: Actinopterygii
- Order: Centrarchiformes
- Family: Terapontidae
- Genus: Lagusia; Vari, 1978
- Species: L. micracanthus

Binomial name
- Lagusia micracanthus (Bleeker, 1860)

Synonyms
- Datnia micracanthus Bleeker, 1860; Therapon micracanthus (Bleeker, 1860)

= Lagusia =

Genus of ray-finned fishes

Lagusia micracanthus is a species of ray-finned fish from the grunter family, Terapontidae, and the only member of the genus Lagusia. It is endemic to rivers, both large and small, in South Sulawesi, Indonesia.

== Appearance and behavior ==
Adults are silver-grey with horizontal dark stripes and yellowish fins. It can reach up to 11.5 cm (4.5 in) in standard length, making them one of the smallest species of grunters. Females as small as 5.6 cm (2.2 in) have carried eggs, showing that they reach maturity at a smaller size than all other grunters. It is typically found in groups. Little is known about its feeding behavior, but one specimens had a stomach filled with insect larvae.
