= Sepedon fuscipennis =

Scientific classification
- Domain: Eukaryota
- Kingdom: Animalia
- Phylum: Arthropoda
- Class: Insecta
- Order: Diptera
- Family: Sciomyzidae
- Genus: Sepedon
- Species: S. fuscipennis

Binomial name
- Sepedon fuscipennis Loew, 1859

Species of fly

Sepedon fuscipennis is a species of marsh fly (insects in the family Sciomyzidae).
