= Sea trumpeter =

- In Western Australia

Scientific classification
- Kingdom: Animalia
- Phylum: Chordata
- Class: Actinopterygii
- Division: Teleostei
- Order: Centrarchiformes
- Family: Terapontidae
- Genus: Pelsartia; Whitley, 1943
- Species: P. humeralis

Binomial name
- Pelsartia humeralis (Ogilby, 1899)

Synonyms
- Therapon humeralis Ogilby, 1899

Species of fish

The sea trumpeter (Pelsartia humeralis) is a species of marine ray-finned fish, a grunter from the family Terapontidae. It is endemic to the southeastern Indian Ocean off the southwestern coats of Australia.

== Taxonomy ==
The sea trumpeter was first formally described in 1899 as Therapon humeralis by James Douglas Ogilby with the type locality given as Pelsaert Island in the Houtman Albrohos. In 1943 Gilbert Percy Whitley placed this species in the monospecific genus Pelsartia.

== Distribution ==
The sea trumpeter is endemic to the coastal waters of south western Australia from Kangaroo Island in South Australia to the Houtman Abrolhos in Western Australia, although it is uncommon in South Australia.

== Description ==
In Western Australia

The sea trumpeter has a moderately deep, long body which is compressed. It has a relatively small, oblique mouth with the upper jaw just reaching, or falling short of, the front of the eye. It has very small, conical teeth arranged in a single band on each jaw, with the outer teeth larger than the inner teeth. The dorsal fin contains 12-13 spines 11 soft rays with a notch two thirds of the way along it and the soft rayed part is rounded. The anal fin is similar in size and shape to the soft part of the dorsal fin and contains 3 spines and 10 soft rays. The caudal fin is slightly notched. There are 80-90 scales in the lateral line. The colour pattern is light greyish to brown dorsally, silvery to white ventrally with 4–5 broad dark vertical bands on the flanks which are more obvious immediately above the centre of the flanks. There are dark stripes on the head which run through and below the eyes. There are small darks spots on the soft part of the dorsal fin, the anal fin and the caudal fin. The juveniles also have 3 horizontal lines of dark spots on their back. They can attain a maximum total length of 38 centimetres (15 in).

== Habitat and biology ==
In Western Australia

The sea trumpeter is commonly found in seagrass beds in shallow water. The juveniles frequently hide amongst seaweed, seagrass or floating mats of macrophytes. This is an omnivorous species. The male guards and fans the eggs. When caught the sea trumpeter emits a grunting noise.
