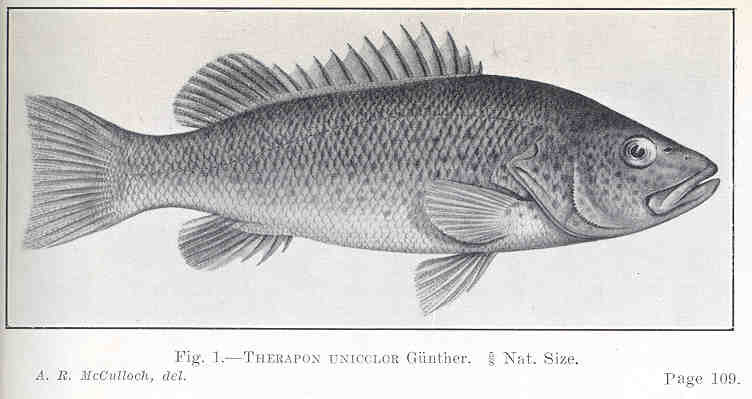

Conservation status
- Least Concern (IUCN 3.1)

Scientific classification
- Kingdom: Animalia
- Phylum: Chordata
- Class: Actinopterygii
- Division: Teleostei
- Order: Centrarchiformes
- Family: Terapontidae
- Genus: Leiopotherapon
- Species: L. unicolor

Binomial name
- Leiopotherapon unicolor (Günther, 1859)

Synonyms
- List: Therapon unicolor Günther, 1859; Madigania unicolor (Günther, 1859); Datnia brevispinis Steindachner, 1867; Therapon truttaceus Macleay, 1881; Therapon longulus Macleay, 1881; Therapon elphinstonensis De Vis, 1884; Terapon idoneus Ogilby, 1906

= Leiopotherapon unicolor =

Species of fish

Leiopotherapon unicolor, the spangled grunter or spangled perch is a species of ray-finned fish, a grunter from the family Terapontidae. It is endemic to Australia.

== Taxonomy ==
Leiopotherapon unicolor was first formally described as Therapon unicolor in 1859 by the German-born British ichthyologist and herpetologist Albert Günther (1830-1914) with the type locality given as Mosquito Creek and Gwydir River in New South Wales.

== Distribution ==
Leiopotherapon unicolor has the widest distribution of any freshwater grunter in Australia and is found over most of the northern two thirds of the continent as far south as Newcastle, New South Wales.

== Description ==
In Queensland

Leiopotherapon unicolor has a slender, oval shaped body which is somewhat compressed, although the juveniles are more rotund. The dorsal profile is mainly convex, the ventral profile is evenly convex and it has a long snout. The mouth is oblique, the maxillary extending past the level of the front of the eye and is equipped with strong conical teeth with those in the outer row enlarged and the inner band being villiform and there are no teeth on the roof of the mouth. They have a continuous dorsal fin with a spiny part to the front which is rounded and contains 11-13 spines with the third or fourth spines being the longerst. The rear part of the dorsal fin has 9-12 soft rays the longest being longer than the longest dorsal fin spines. The anal fin has 3 short spines and 7-10 soft rays and has a softly, rounded shape. The caudal fin is slightly emarginate.

It is an attractive species which is silvery grey to silvery blue in colour on the body marked with many reddish-brown spots, apart from the abdomen. The juveniles have an obvious dark bar on lower lobe of the caudal fin. The maximum recorded standard length is 31 centimetres (12 in).

== Habitat and biology ==
In the Northern Territory

Leiopotherapon unicolor occurs in a wide range of water conditions, it can be found in running to still waters with turbidity ranging from clear to almost opaque as well as being able to tolerate a wide range of salinities and showing the ability to live in a wide range of temperatures. Among the waterbodies it can be found include intermittent waters, and these waters are where it is most numerous. It also inhabits lakes, dams, rivers, billabongs, bore drains, wells and waterholes. In the interior of Australia this species may be found in any temporary waterbody, even wheel ruts flooded after rains. This species is purported to appear in odd places following so called "rain of fish", as they are often observed scattered on the ground in the aftermath of heavy downpours. However, the fish have been transported to these places by flooding. This hardy species can survive dry periods by aestivation in the least amount of moisture in the bottom of a temporary waterbody. It is an omnivorous species which has a diet of consisting largely of aquatic and terrestrial insects, crustaceans and some molluscs, however it will also prey on small fish and consume a small amount of algae and aquatic weeds.

=== Reproduction ===
In Queensland

Spawning takes place from November when water temperatures reach 20–26 °C (68–79 °F) and happens during the night. Before spawning the fish move upstream in rivers or towards the shallows in lakes and ponds so that they can spawn on soft beds. Once laid the eggs take two days to hatch and the larvae take around 24 days to change to juveniles. The males guard and fan the eggs. The females attain sexual maturity at a standard length of 78 millimetres (3.1 in) and a 24 grams (0.85 oz) female may produce 24,000 eggs and one at 65 grams (2.3 oz) can produce 113,200.
