= Eastern striped grunter =

- In New South Wales, Australia

Conservation status
- Least Concern (IUCN 3.1)

Scientific classification
- Kingdom: Animalia
- Phylum: Chordata
- Class: Actinopterygii
- Division: Teleostei
- Order: Centrarchiformes
- Family: Terapontidae
- Genus: Helotes; Cuvier, 1829
- Species: H. sexlineatus

Binomial name
- Helotes sexlineatus (Quoy & Gaimard, 1825

Synonyms
- List: Helotes sexlineatus (Bloch, 1790); Terapon sexlineatus Quoy & Gaimard, 1825; Pelates sexlineatus (Quoy & Gaimard, 1825); Pelates quinquelineatus Cuvier, 1829

Species of fish

The Eastern striped grunter (Helotes sexlineatus) is a species of marine ray-finned fish, a grunter from the family Terapontidae. It is found in the Indo-Pacific region where it is found in coastal waters and is an omnivore.

== Taxonomy ==
The Eastern striped grunter was first formally described as Terapon sexlineatus in 1825 by the French naturalists Jean René Constant Quoy and Joseph Paul Gaimard with the type locality given as Shark Bay, Western Australia. Georges Cuvier created the monotypic genus Helotes for this species in 1829 and most authorities retain this species as the only species in this genus.

== Distribution ==
The Eastern striped grunter is found from Singapore east to Australia and north to China and Okinawa. It has been reported from India but this need to be confirmed.

== Description ==
In Queensland, Australia

The Eastern striped grunter is a small species of grunter with an oblong body which has slight lateral compression. It has jaws of equal length, a small oblique mouth the end of which extends to a level hallway between the nostril and the front edge of the eye. It has tricuspid teeth with the cusps all being the same size and which are arranged in bands on each jaw with the outermost row of teeth having the largest teeth. The dorsal fin has 11or 12 spines and 9 to 11 soft rays, the spiny part of the fin is arched with the fifth or sixth spines being longer than the others and the second last spine is shorter than last spine. The anal fin has 3 spines and 9 to 11 soft rays. The lateral line contains 76 to 87 pored scales. The upper part of the body is greyish or bluish in colour while the lower part of the body is silvery or whitish. There are 5 to 8 narrow, dark brown or black horizontal stripes along the body. The midlateral stripe reaches the base of the caudal fin. The spiny portion of the dorsal fin has a black margin on the membranes between the spines membranes. There is a dark blotch on the body behind the nape and shows variation in the intensity of its pigment. The caudal fin has a dark border and several bands made up of faint spots at its base, but lacks obvious transverse black striping. the maximum total length is 15 centimetres (5.9 in).

== Habitat and biology ==
The eastern striped grunter is found at depths of 1 to 30 metres (3.3 to 98.4 ft) and are found in schools in sheltered seagrass beds, sandy areas and in coastal reefs. It is most numerous in weedy areas close to the mouth of estuaries. The juveniles inhabit seagrass beds, moving into them after ending their larval stage. It is an omnivorous species but the major part of its diet comprises small fishes and invertebrates. The eggs are guarded and fanned by the male.

== Fisheries ==
The Eastern striped grunter is of minor commercial importance to Fisheries, and is often taken as bycatch. It is caught using handlines, seine nets and other inshore fishing gear. The catch is marketed fresh. It is also targeted by recreational fishermen in New South Wales.
