= The Trumpeter (song) =

Single by John McCormack
- Written: 1904
- Released: 1918
- Genre: pop
- Length: 2:09
- Label: Victor
- Composer: J. Airlie Dix
- Lyricist: J. Francis Barron

"The Trumpeter" is a 1904 song with music by J. Airlie Dix (d.1911) and lyrics by J. Francis Barron (1870-1940) which became a widely popular before, during and after World War I. Also known by the song's opening line and refrain "Trumpeter, what are you sounding now?", it was recorded with full orchestral arrangement by various artists including Peter Dawson and John McCormack.

== Lyrics ==
Trumpeter, what are you sounding now?

(Is it the call I'm seeking?)

"You'll know the call," said the Trumpeter tall,

"When my trumpet goes a-speakin'.

I'm rousin' 'em up;

I'm waking' 'em up,

The tents are astir in the valley,

And there's no more sleep with the sun's first peep,

For I'm soundin' the old Reveille!"

Trumpeter what are you sounding now?

(Is it the call I'm seeking?)

"Can't mistake the call," said the Trumpeter tall,

"When my trumpet goes a-speakin'.

I'm urging' 'em on,

They're scamperin' on,

There's a drummin' of hoofs like thunder.

There's a madd'nin' shout as the sabres flash out,

For I'm sounding the "Charge" no wonder."

Trumpeter what are you sounding now?

(Is it the call I'm seeking?)

"Lucky for you if you hear it at all

For my trumpet's but faint in speakin',

I'm callin' 'em home! Come home! Come home!

Tread light o'er the dead in the valley,

Who are lyin' around face down to the ground,

And they can't hear me sound the 'Rally'.

But they'll hear it again in a grand refrain

When Gabriel sounds the 'Rally'."
