= Sepedon neili =

Scientific classification
- Kingdom: Animalia
- Phylum: Arthropoda
- Clade: Pancrustacea
- Class: Insecta
- Order: Diptera
- Family: Sciomyzidae
- Genus: Sepedon
- Species: S. neili

Binomial name
- Sepedon neili Steyskal, 1951

Species of fly

Sepedon neili is a species of marsh fly (insects in the family Sciomyzidae).
