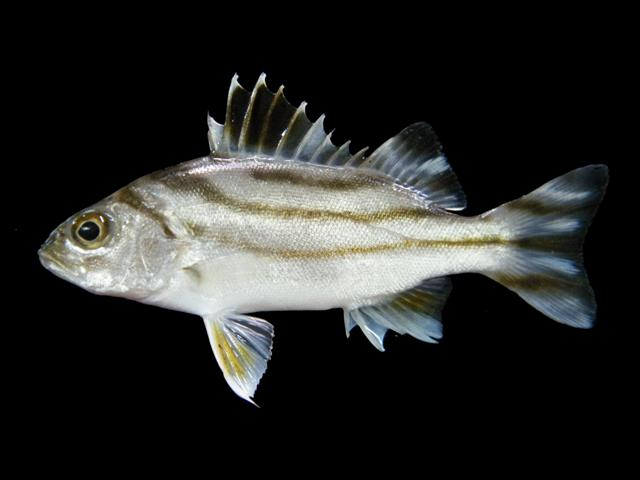
- Terapon jarbua (type species)

Scientific classification
- Kingdom: Animalia
- Phylum: Chordata
- Class: Actinopterygii
- Division: Teleostei
- Order: Centrarchiformes
- Suborder: Terapontoidei
- Family: Terapontidae; Richardson, 1842

Type species
- Holocentrus servus Bloch, 1790

Genera
- see text

= Terapontidae =

Family of ray-finned fishes

Grunters or tigerperches are ray-finned fishes in the family Terapontidae.

== Characteristics ==
The Terapontidae is a large family of small to medium-sized perciform fishes which occur in marine, brackish and fresh waters in the Indo-Pacific region. They are characterised by a single long-based dorsal fin which has a notch marking the boundary between the spiny and soft-rayed portions. They have small to moderate-sized scales, a continuous lateral line reaching the caudal fin, and most species lack teeth on the roof of the mouth.

The marine species are found in inshore sea and brackish waters, some species are able to enter extremely saline and fresh waters. In Australia and New Guinea there are a number of species restricted to fresh water.

== Classification ==
The following genera are classified within the family Terpontidae:

- Amniataba Whitley, 1943
- Bidyanus Whitley, 1943
- Hannia Vari, 1978
- Helotes Cuvier, 1829
- Hephaestus De Vis, 1884
- Lagusia Vari 1978
- Leiopotherapon Fowler, 1931
- Mesopristes Bleeker, 1873
- Pelates Cuvier, 1829
- Pelsartia Whitley, 1943
- Pingalla Whitley, 1955
- Rhynchopelates Fowler, 1931
- Scortum Whitley, 1943
- Syncomistes Vari, 1978
- Terapon Cuvier, 1816
- Variichthys Allen, 1993
