= Rudderfish =

Rudderfish may refer to:

- Sea chubs, fish of the family Kyphosidae
- Centrolophus niger, Black ruff or rudderfish
- Coryphaena pompilus
- Girella nigricans, Opaleye or rudderfish
- Icichthys lockingtoni, Medusafish or brown rudderfish
- Kyphosus bigibbus, Grey sea chub or rudderfish
- Kyphosus cinerascens, Blue seachub or rudderfish
- Kyphosus hawaiiensis, Insular rudderfish
- Kyphosus sandwicensis, Pacific rudderfish
- Kyphosus sectatrix, Bermuda chub or rudderfish
- Kyphosus vaigiensis, Brassy chub or rudderfish
- Proteracanthus sarissophorus, Sea chub or rudderfish
- Psenopsis anomala, Japanese butterfish or Pacific rudderfish
- Seriola zonata, Banded rudderfish
- Tubbia stewarti, Seamount rudderfish
- Tubbia tasmanica, Tasmanian ruffe or rudderfish
