= Kyphosus ocyurus =

- In Panama

Scientific classification
- Kingdom: Animalia
- Phylum: Chordata
- Class: Actinopterygii
- Division: Teleostei
- Order: Centrarchiformes
- Family: Kyphosidae
- Genus: Kyphosus
- Species: K. ocyurus

Binomial name
- Kyphosus ocyurus (Jordan & Gilbert, 1882)

Synonyms
- List: Pimelepterus ocyurus Jordan & Gilbert, 1882; Chloroscombrus ocyurus (Jordan & Gilbert, 1882); Sectator azureus Jordan & Evermann, 1903; Sectator ocyurus Jordan & Gilbert, 1882

Species of fish

Kyphosus ocyurus, the blue-striped chub or rainbow chub, is a species of marine ray-finned fish, a sea chub from the family Kyphosidae. The species is found in the Pacific Ocean where it prefers rocky substrates.

== Taxonomy ==
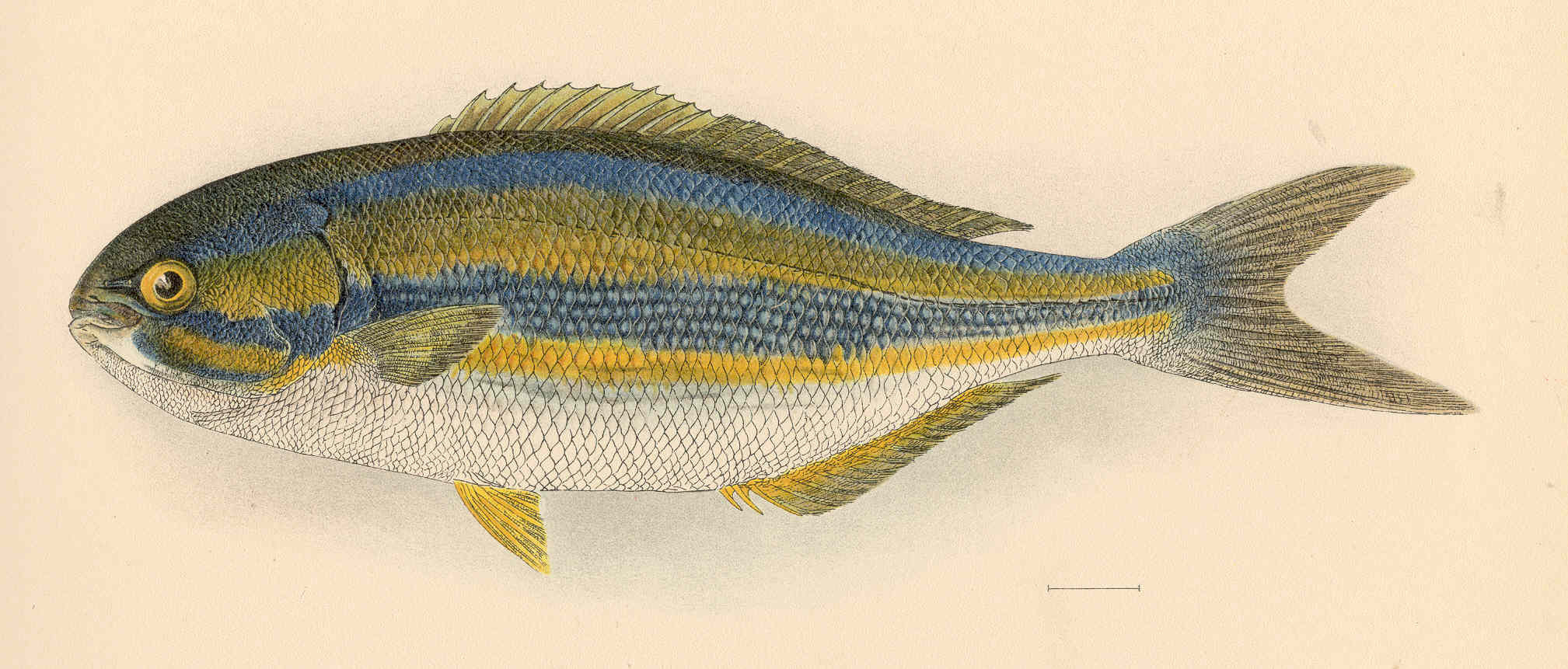
1905 illustration by Kako Morita of the holotype, caught in Hawaii at 15.25 inches in length.

Kyphosus ocyurus was first formally described as Pimelepterus ocyurus in 1882 by David Starr Jordan and Charles Henry Gilbert with the type locality given as Panama Bay. K. ocyurus was placed in its own genus, Sectator but molecular data has revealed that it is the sister species of K. vaigiensis and is so placed within the genus Kyphosus. The genus Sectator was considered to have two species, S. azureus and S. ocyurus, before both were reclassified as Kyphosus ocyurus.

== Distribution ==
Kyphosus ocyurus is found in the tropical eastern Pacific Ocean from the Galapagos Islands to Hawaii west to the Izu Islands of Japan and including Guam, Palau and the Marquesas Islands. It also occurs off the American coast from southern California to Peru.

== Description ==
Schooling, in Panama

Kyphosus ocyurus has an elongated, compressed, oval shaped body. The ventral and dorsal profiles of the head are convex with a short snout and a very short, horizontal mouth which opens at the front. The upper jaw is partially concealed beneath the orbital bones when the mouth is closed and the teeth are small, fixed and are incisor-like with flattened tips. There are also teeth in the middle of the roof of the mouth. It has a continuous dorsal fin which has 11 spines in the anterior part which fold down into a scaled groove and 13 soft rays in the posterior part. The anal fin has three spines and 14 soft rays and is low. The caudal fin deeply forked. All of the body is covered in small, thick and rough scales except for the snout.

The body of this species is distinctively coloured with two wavy horizontal stripes, one yellow and one bluish, starting at the mouth and extending to the caudal peduncle. The head is yellow to silvery marked with a blue streak behind eye on he dill cover. It is metallic blue on the back and white on the underparts. It attains a maximum total length of 59 centimetres (23 in) although a more common size is a total length of 25 centimetres (9.8 in) and the maximum published weight is 2.0 kilograms (4.4 lb).

== Habitat and biology ==
Schooling, in Panama

Kyphosus ocyrus is an uncommon species which can be found as both solitary individuals and in schools, frequently mixed with K. elegans and K. vaigiensis. They live near the surface, no deeper than 25 metres (82 ft) along rocky shores, in the open ocean and in reefs off isolated islands. They have also been observed to swim rapidly in small schools in open water over deep reefs, along sea walls and at drop-offs. They are also frequently reported near floating logs far out to sea. It is more omnivorous than other species in the genus Kyphosus and its diet includes zooplankton. K. ocyurus tends not to live in submerged vegetation, preferring a mix of an open water and coral reef environment. In fact, its preferred habitat is that of a hard ocean bottom and ample visibility. Submerged vegetation is preferred for laying fish larvae, and therefore most juveniles and young briefly live in submerged vegetation before reaching adulthood and subsequently moving into a more open ocean environment. In terms of movement and overall K. ocyurus migration, it tends to widely disperse from the Indo-Pacific Ocean region into the East-Pacific Ocean region and eventually into the North Atlantic Ocean region, and these fish can cross the Pacific Ocean barrier relatively smoothly, preventing otherwise major external and environmental disturbances from negatively affecting the population connectivity of the species.

The coelomic organs of K. ocyurus are similar to those of most of the other members of the family Kyphosidae. The intestine arrangement of K. ocyurus is complex, with a z-shaped winding pathway with an average length of 28 millimeter., rather than the common single loop, common in many kyphosines but still a more advanced character state when compared to other perciforms. K. ocyurus has three loops tilted to the right in the z-shaped intestinal pathway instead of one loop, which is common in many of its Kyphosidae relatives.
