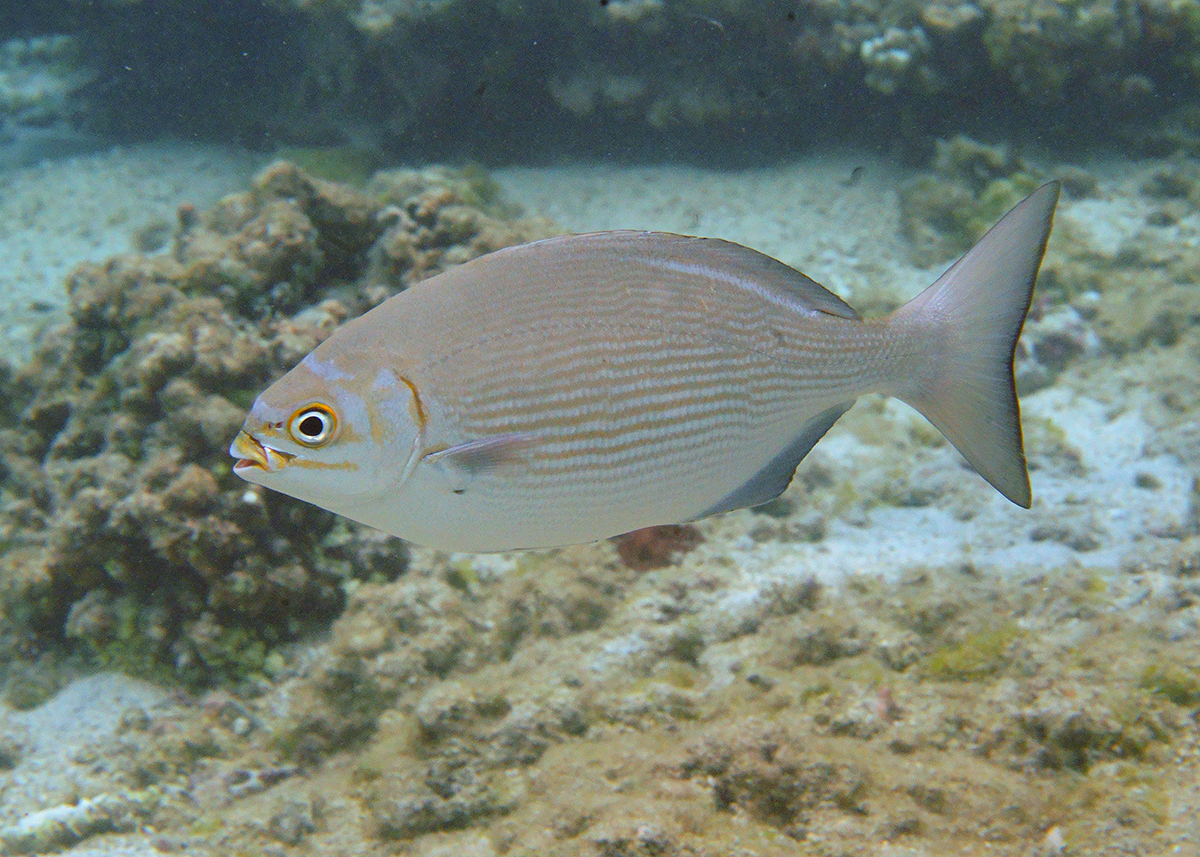
- At Réunion

Conservation status
- Least Concern (IUCN 3.1)

Scientific classification
- Kingdom: Animalia
- Phylum: Chordata
- Class: Actinopterygii
- Division: Teleostei
- Order: Centrarchiformes
- Family: Kyphosidae
- Genus: Kyphosus
- Species: K. vaigiensis

Binomial name
- Kyphosus vaigiensis (Quoy & Gaimard, 1825)

Synonyms
- List: Pimelepterus vaigiensis Quoy & Gaimard, 1825; Cantharus lineolatus Valenciennes, 1830; Pimelepterus marciac Cuvier, 1831; Pimelepterus lembus Cuvier, 1831; Kyphosus lembus (Cuvier, 1831); Pimelepterus ternatensis Bleeker, 1853; Pimelepterus analogus Gill, 1862; Kyphosus analogus (Gill, 1862); Pimelepterus flavolineatus Poey, 1866; Kyphosus gibsoni Ogilby, 1912; Segutilum gibsoni (Ogilby, 1912); Kyphosus bleekeri Fowler, 1933; also see Taxonomy section

= Kyphosus vaigiensis =

Species of fish

Kyphosus vaigiensis, commonly referred to as the brassy chub, is a species of marine ray-finned fish, a sea chub from the family Kyphosidae. It is a largely herbivorous species which has a circumglobal distribution.

== Etymology ==
It is most commonly referred to as the brassy chub. Other names include brassy drummer, long-finned drummer, low-finned drummer, Northern silver drummer, Queensland drummer, Southern drummer, blue-bronze sea chub, brassy rudderfish, yellow seachub, large-tailed drummer, low-finned chub or long-finned rudderfish.

== Taxonomy ==
Kyphosus vaigiensis was first formally described as Pimelepterus vaigiensis in 1825 by Jean René Constant Quoy and Joseph Paul Gaimard with the type locality given as Waigeo in modern West Papua.

Kyphosus analogus of the eastern Pacific Ocean and Kyphosus incisor of the Atlantic Ocean were found to fall within the morphological and molecular variation of K. viagiensis which had previously been thought to be confined to the Indo-Pacific.

== Distribution ==
Kyphosus vaigiensis has a distribution that encompasses most of the warmer seas and oceans of the world. In the Pacific Ocean it is found from the western coast of the Americas west coast from Mexico to Panama and across the Pacific to Hawaii, Easter Island, Polynesia, Tahiti, Micronesia as far as Japan and Australia, with records from Hauraki Gulf in New Zealand. In the Indian Ocean it occurs through to the Red Sea, eastern coast of Africa and off Madagascar. In the eastern Atlantic Ocean its range includes the Ascension Island, St Helena and São Tomé Island while in the western Atlantic it is found off the Yucatan, the Caribbean, Bermuda and Trindade and Martin Vaz.

It has been recorded in the Mediterranean Sea, the first record in Spain in 1998 and it has been recorded off Sicily, Cyprus, Israel and Turkey. It is thought that these originated in the Atlantic and entered the Mediterranean through the Straits of Gibraltar but as it occurs in the Red Sea some may have arrived in the Mediterranean by Lessepsian migration through the Suez Canal. It may be establishing a permanent breeding population in the Mediterranean.

== Description ==
Kyphosus vaigiensis has an elongate and oval-shaped body with a moderately emarginate caudal fin. The head is small with a short snout and a small, terminal mouth which has small incisor-shaped teeth, there are also teeth on the roof of the mouth and on the tongue. The dorsal and anal fins are not high. The dorsal fin has 10-11 spines and 13-15 soft rays while the anal fin has 3 spines and 12-14 soft rays. The dorsal fin can fold into a sheath. The presence of scales in the interorbital region is an identifying feature. The colour of body is silvery with a bluish shine, marked with 23-29 golden horizontal lines along the body with those above the lateral line curving parallel to it. There is a golden streak below the eye which runs from the snout to just beyion the front edge of the eye. The fins are grey or a slightly darker grey than the colour of the body. The maximum total length recorded is 70 centimetres (28 in), although a more common total length is around 50 centimetres (20 in).

In Hawaii

At Norfolk Island

In Hawaii

== Habitat and biology ==
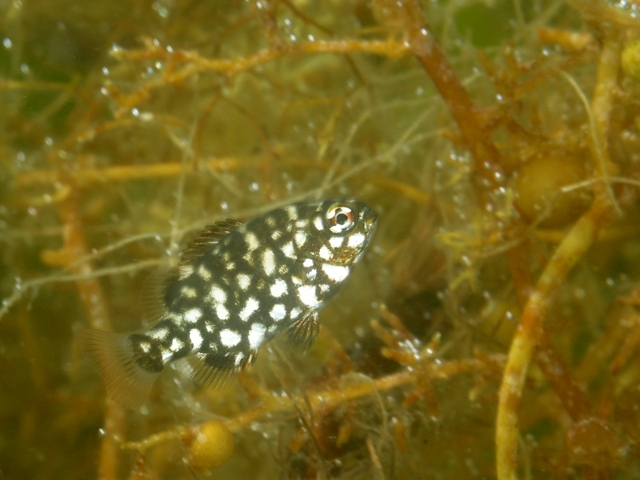
Juvenile

Kyphosus vaigiensis adults congregate over the hard, algal coated substrates of exposed surf-swept outer reef flats, lagoons, and seaward reefs. It occurs to a maximum depth of 24 metres (79 ft). It is found in exposed areas around rocky reefs, and adults usually stay close to the shoreline, while juveniles are recorded among flotsam and may be found in the open ocean near the surface. The juveniles feed on small crustaceans while the adults are carnivorous during the summer and autumn but feed on Petalonia binghamiae in the winter. They tend to be solitary at higher latitudes and more social in the tropics where they will form mixed schools with K. bigibbus, K. cinerascens and K. sectatrix.
