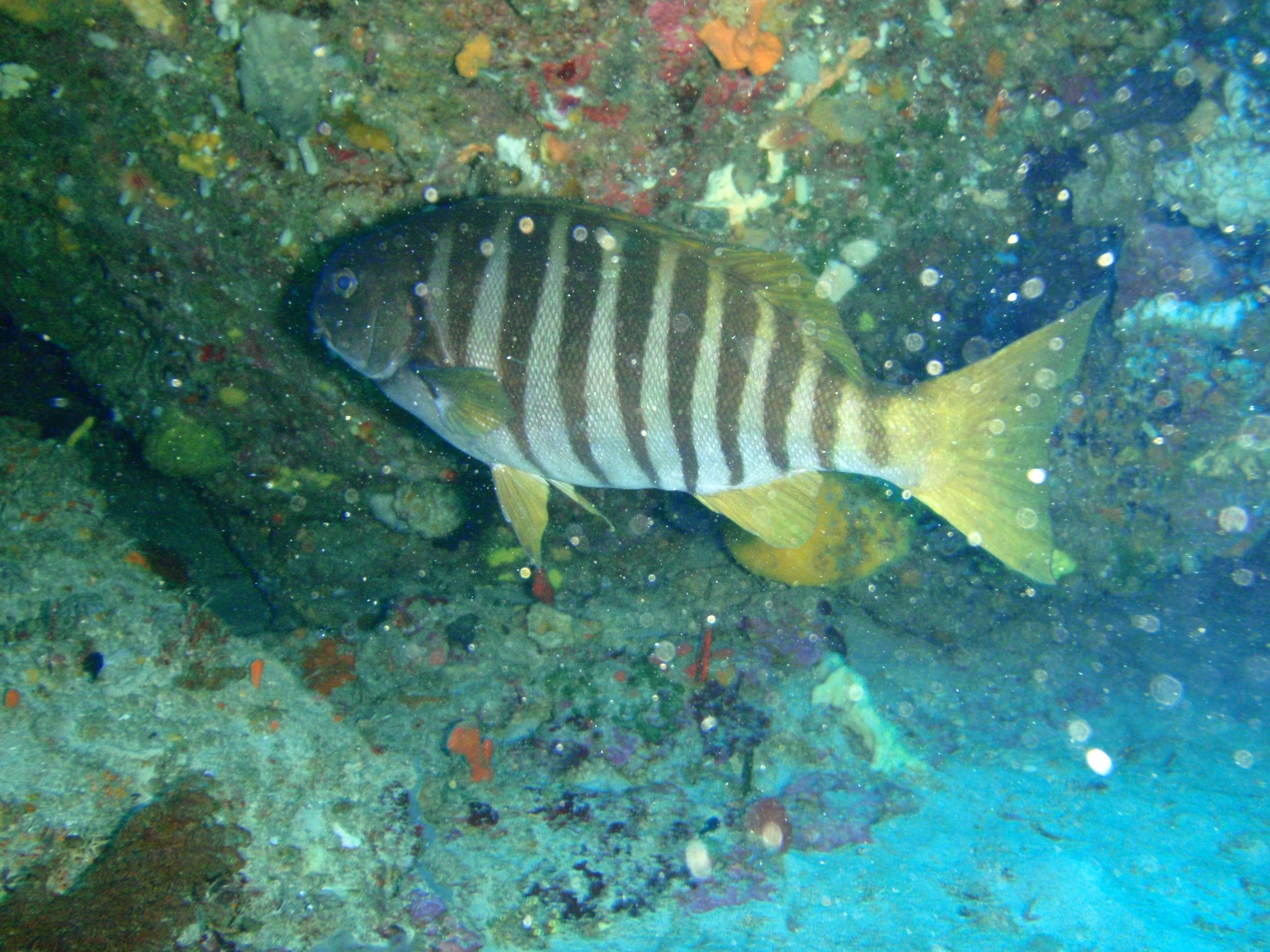

Scientific classification
- Kingdom: Animalia
- Phylum: Chordata
- Class: Actinopterygii
- Division: Teleostei
- Order: Centrarchiformes
- Family: Girellidae
- Genus: Girella
- Species: G. zebra

Binomial name
- Girella zebra (Richardson, 1846)

Synonyms
- List: Crenidens zebra Richardson, 1846; Girellichthys zebra (Richardson, 1846); Melambaphes zebra (Richardson, 1846); Melambaphes guentheri Gill, 1863

= Girella zebra =

Species of fish

Girella zebra, also known as zebrafish or stripey bream, is a species of marine ray-finned fish in the family Girellidae. It lives in the Indo-Pacific, where it is endemic to the coastal waters of southern Australia.

== Taxonomy ==
Girella zebra was first formally described as Crenidens zebra by the Scottish naval surgeon, naturalist and Arctic explorer Sir John Richardson in volume 2 of his Ichthyology of the voyage of H. M. S. Erebus & Terror published in 1846.

=== Hybridisation ===
Girella zebra is rare in New South Wales. There, and in eastern Victoria, it hybridises with G. elevata.

== Distribution ==
Girella zebra is found in the Indian and western Pacific Ocean; it is endemic to southern Australia. It can be found from Clarence River in New South Wales south to Tasmania, all along the southern Australian coast and up the western coast of Western Australia north to Port Denison.

== Description ==
Juveniles, in Tasmania
In Western Australia

Closeup, in Victoria

Girella zebra has a moderately short and deep, compressed, oval body with a relatively thin caudal peduncle. It has a small head with a bulging forehead and small eyes. The mouth is small, not extending to the level of the front of the eye. The maxilla are hidden beneath the preorbital bones. There are two rows of teeth on each jaw; the outer row consists of non-overlapping, flattened, tricuspid teeth, while the adjacent inner row is made up of a wide band of minute teeth similar in shape to the teeth in the outer row. The fish is largely covered in small ctenoid scales and the lateral line is continuous, has 72-80 scales and arches in parallel to the curve of the back. The dorsal fin is continuous and shows almost no difference in height between the spiny and soft-rayed parts. The spiny part has 14 spines, is around a third longer than the soft-rayed part, which as 13-15 soft rays, with the longest spines, which are marginally longer than the longest rays, are in its middle. The anal fin is similar in length and form to the soft-rayed part of the dorsal fin and sits opposite it. The anal fin has three spines and 11 soft rays. The large caudal fin is broadly forked, the pectoral and pelvic fins are small, and the uppermost rays of the pectoral fin are the longest.

The adult G. zebra has a pale body with nine or ten dark bars on the flanks, which taper ventrally, with pale yellow fins. The juveniles are darker with more indistinct markings, and may be confused for luderick. This species grows to a maximum total length of 34 centimetres (13 in).

== Habitat and biology ==
Schooling, at South Australia

Girella zebra is normally found around rocky reefs in shallow coastal waters from 0–20 metres (0–66 ft) in depth. It may also be observed in sheltered offshore waters and in estuaries.

The flattened teeth and long narrow gill rakers are used to feed on small prey. It is mainly a herbivore, feeding on seaweeds, but it will also feed on benthic invertebrates such as sea squirts. This is a schooling species.

=== Parasites ===
Members of the Girella zebra species are hosts to a recently discovered species of parasitic flatworms. Pholeohedra overstreeti was identified and described by dissecting the intestines of the Girella zebra, showing a parasitic relationship.
