= Kyphosus azureus =

- In California

Conservation status
- Least Concern (IUCN 3.1)

Scientific classification
- Kingdom: Animalia
- Phylum: Chordata
- Class: Actinopterygii
- Division: Teleostei
- Order: Centrarchiformes
- Family: Kyphosidae
- Genus: Kyphosus
- Species: K. azureus

Binomial name
- Kyphosus azureus (O. P. Jenkins & Evermann, 1889)

Synonyms
- Hermosilla azurea Jenkins & Evermann, 1889; Hermosilla robusta Osburn & Nichols, 1916

Species of fish

Kyphosus azureus, the zebra-perch sea chub, zebra perch or zebra sea chub, is a species of marine ray-finned fish, a sea chub from the family Kyphosidae which is native to the eastern Pacific Ocean coasts of North America.

== Taxonomy ==
Kyphosus azureus was first formally described in 1889 by Oliver Peebles Jenkins and Barton Warren Evermann as Hermosilla azurea and they gave the type locality as Guaymas, Sonora in western Mexico. In 2013 a review of the family Kyphosidae found that the monospecific genus Hermosilla was a synonym of Kyphosus.

== Distribution ==
Kyphosus azureus is found in the eastern Pacific Ocean where it is found from Monterey Bay in California to Baja California and into the Gulf of California where it is commonest in the northern and central parts of the gulf.

== Description ==
In California

Kyhosus azureus has a moderately deep, compressed, oval body with a small head which has a pointed snout and a small, thickly lipped mouth. There is a continuous dorsal fin which contains 11 spines, which can be folded down into a scaly furrow, and 9 soft rays. The spiny part of the dorsal fin is longer than thesoft-rayed part. The anal fin has 3 spine and 10 The body is covered in thick, rough scales soft rays which are longer than those in the dorsal fin. The caudal fin is forked and the pelvic and pectoral fins are small. The body is covered in small, rough scales except for the snout and between the eyes. The body has a pale khaki colour broken by 10 or so long brown vertical bars. It has a blue spot on the upper margin of the gill cover and a black spot underneath the base of the pectoral fin. The underparts are whitish. This species attains a maximum total length of 45 centimetres (18 in).

== Habitat and biology ==
Kyphosus azureus is a shallow water species found in inshore areas down to depths of 8 metres (26 ft). Here it occurs on coastal rocky reefs and reef flats where there is growth of algae. The adults live in the subtidal zone and the juveniles in rock pools. It is a herbivorous species eating red, brown, and green algae. Juveniles behave as cleaner fish for the opaleye (Girella nigricans) and shiner perch {Cymatogaster aggregata) They are often form mixed schools with halfmoon (Medianluna californiensis) Opaleye, and Pacific sergeant major (Abudefduf troschelii). At night this diurnal species hides in crevices. they are pelagic spawners.
