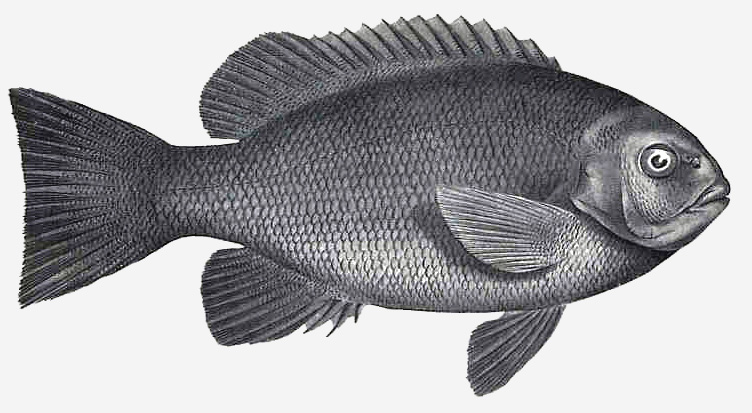
- FMIB 36163 Girella elevata, Macleay

Scientific classification
- Kingdom: Animalia
- Phylum: Chordata
- Class: Actinopterygii
- Order: Centrarchiformes
- Family: Girellidae
- Genus: Girella
- Species: G. elevata

Binomial name
- Girella elevata W. J. Macleay, 1881

= Girella elevata =

Species of fish

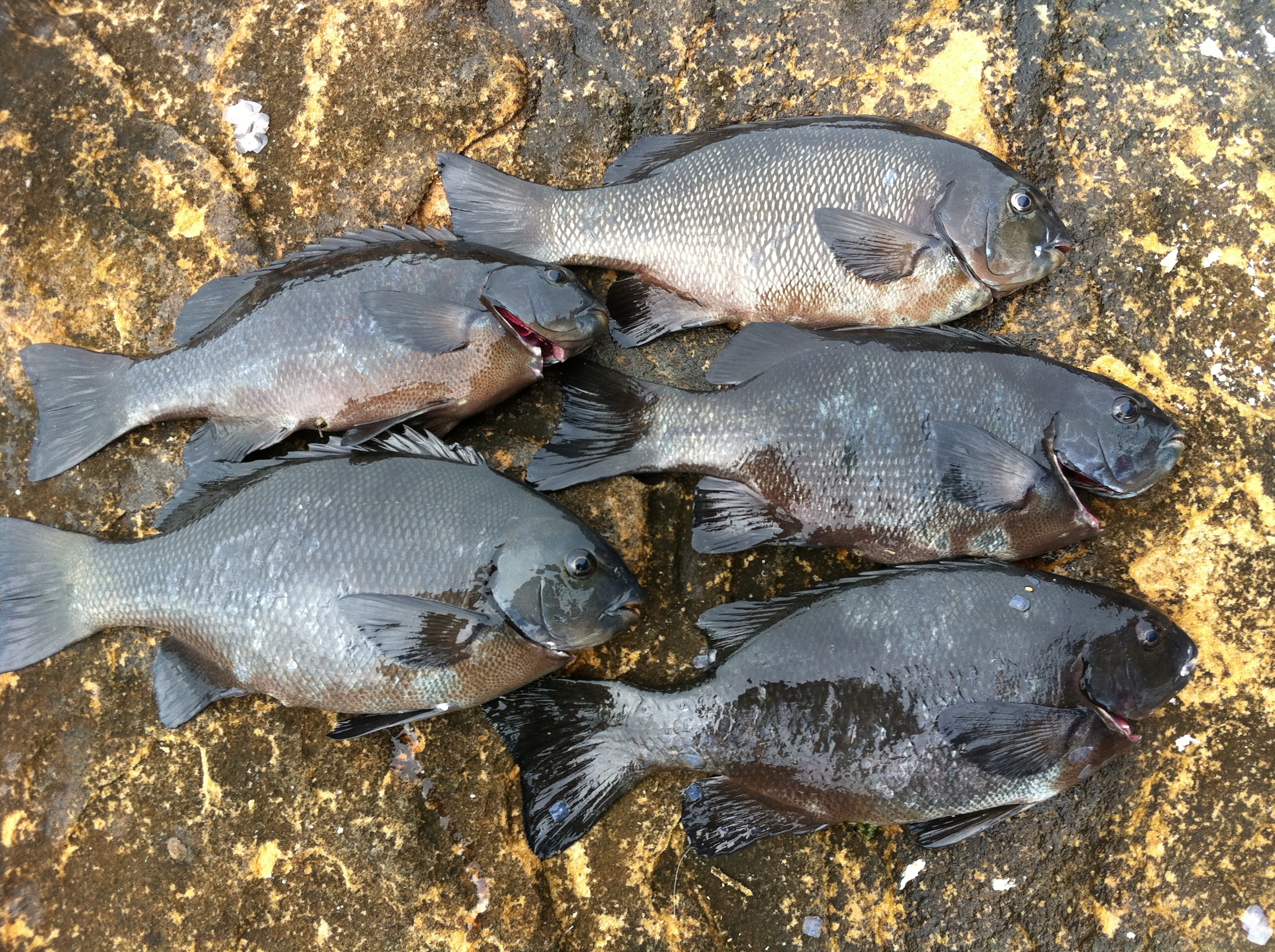
Girella elevata ('rock blackfish', 'black drummer', 'pig') caught by anglers at Barrenjoey Headland, NSW, Australia in July 2011

Girella elevata, the rock blackfish, Eastern rock blackfish, black rockfish or Eastern rock blackfish drummer is a species of marine ray-finned fish, a sea chub from the family Kyphosidae. It is found in the southwestern Pacific Ocean around eastern Australia and northern New Zealand.

== Description ==
Girella elevata has a moderately deep, compressed oval shaped body with a narrow caudal peduncle and a small head which has a slightly bulging forehead. It has a small mouth which does not extend as far as the eye. Each jaw is equipped with a two rows of teeth, an outer row of flattened three-crowned teeth which do not overlap and an inner row of similar but much smaller teeth. It has ctenoid scales which cover much of the body and it has a continuous lateral line which is arched in parallel with the body's dorsal profile. The dorsal fin is continuous and there is almost no difference in form between the spiny and rayed parts of the dorsal fin. The spiny part is about a third longer than the rayed portion. The spines become longer towards the trail and the soft rays are noticeably longer than the spines. The soft-rayed part of the dorsal fin is rounded. The anal fin is similar in shape to and lies opposite to the soft-rayed part of the dorsal fin. It has a very large and deeply forked caudal fin It has small pectoral fins in which the upper rays are the longest and small pelvic fins, located below, and just to the rear of the base of the pectoral fins. The dorsal fin has 14-16 spines and 11-12 soft rays while the anal fin has three spines and 11-12 soft rays. It can reach a length of 62 centimetres (24 in) standard length and average weight of 1 kilogram (2.2 lb) standard weight to 2 kilograms (4.4 lb) standard weight, but can exceed 3 kilograms (6.6 lb). This species is uniformly blackish-brown to grey on their body with a black margin along the posterior edge of the operculum. The juveniles are less uniformly coloured, being more mottled, as the dark colour is broken by bands on the back. It can be confused with the silver drummer (Kyphosus sydneyanus).

== Distribution ==
Girella elevata is found in the south-western Pacific Ocean in coastal eastern Australia and northern New Zealand. In Australia it occurs from Noosa Heads, Queensland south to Apollo Bay in Victoria and northern Tasmania, although it is rare west of Wilsons Promontory in Victoria. It is also found around Lord Howe Island in the Tasman Sea.

Rock blackfish have been reported in waters off Japan, although these were most likely Girella leonina or punctata, both having “blackfish” as part of their Japanese names (both of which are primary targets of Japanese ISO fishers, who sometimes charter helicopters for day trips to offshore islands to fish for them). Another related species that can be mistaken for elata is the dusky sea chub, Girella freminvillii, which has been seen in the Galápagos Islands.

== Habitat and biology ==
Girella elevata show a preference as adults for areas of rocky reef in exposed situations where they can be found from the surf zone down to around 25 metres (82 ft). They are frequently observed by divers in caves or below ledges. The juveniles occur in rockpools, estuaries and areas of rocky reef in shallow waters. This species may live as long as 45 years. It is omnivorous and feeds on a range of invertebrates and algae.

== Fisheries ==
Girella elevata is a highly sought after target of recreational fishermen due to its reputation as a brutally tough fighter when hooked, said by some to have given rise to the angler's colloquial name of pig, although it has also been suggested that this stems from the sounds it makes when landed and its fine eating qualities. Because its preferred habitat is in the white-wash around rocky outcrops immediately along the coastal shoreline, most anglers targeting rock blackfish are land-based. Rock blackfish can also be caught from water craft, but this is considered a high-risk activity due to the dangers of fishing very close to shore.

Because drummer inhabit the white-water in the washes and rocky outcrops on the coastal fringe, they are a relatively powerful fish for their size with a large tail fin that allows them to maneuver in that turbulent zone. The best times of day to fish for drummer are usually in the period approaching a high tide, and/or during low light periods such as dawn or dusk. Drummer also seem to be more active during rougher ocean conditions, although anglers must be especially vigilant for their safety when fishing during higher seas. To catch drummer, anglers firstly need to identify a location that is relatively safe to fish and appears likely to hold drummer, generally deeper water adjacent to a bombora. Fish are then attracted through the use of a bread-based berley stream.

=== Bait, tackle and rigs ===
Because rock blackfish are omnivorous, they will take a range of baits including cunjevoi, peeled prawn, bread and sea cabbage. Bait should be lightly weighted so it washes around in the white-water as realistically as possible. Anglers need to maintain contact with the bait or else risk it sinking too deep and likely becoming snagged on the rocks and kelp below. However if the bait is not allowed to sink far enough down it will not reach the drummer who often station themselves in overhangs and caves several meters/feet from the surface. This can be a frustrating method of fishing and takes practice.

Rigs for drummer fishing are generally very simple, using a monofilament line around 11 kilograms (24 lb), and either using a running ball sinker rig (where a pea sized sinker is threaded on the line and sits freely directly above the hook), or suspending bait below a bobby cork. Strong hooks are required for this style of fishing.

== Species description ==
Girella elevata was first formally described by William John Macleay in 1881 with the type locality being given as Port Jackson, New South Wales.
