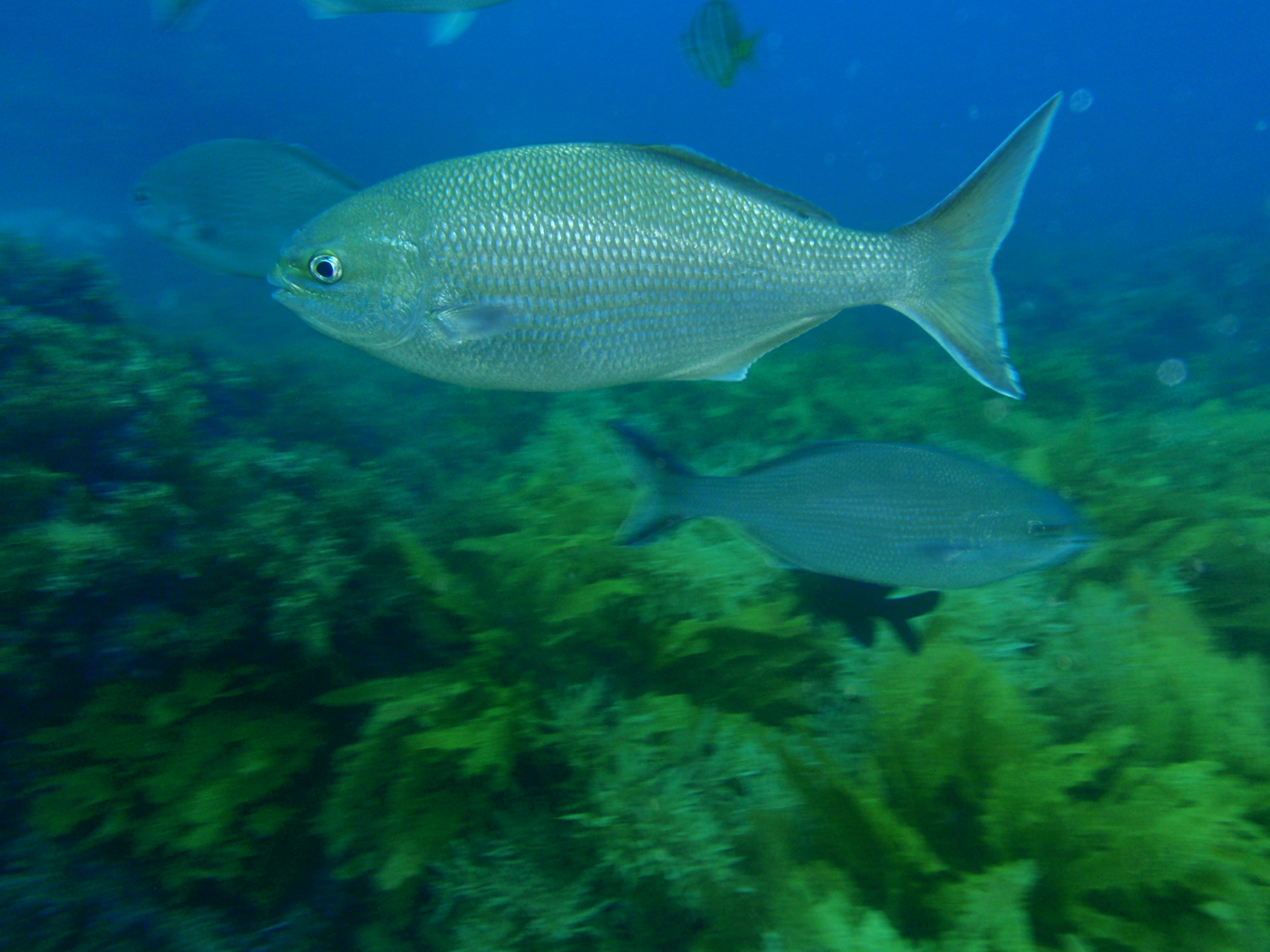

Scientific classification
- Kingdom: Animalia
- Phylum: Chordata
- Class: Actinopterygii
- Division: Teleostei
- Order: Centrarchiformes
- Family: Kyphosidae
- Genus: Kyphosus
- Species: K. cornelii

Binomial name
- Kyphosus cornelii (Whitley, 1944)

Synonyms
- Segutilum cornelii Whitley, 1944

= Kyphosus cornelii =

Species of fish

Kyphosus cornelii, the Western buffalo bream, Cornel's drummer or the Western drummer, is a species of marine ray-finned fish, a sea chub belonging to the family Kyphosidae. It is endemic to Western Australia.

== Taxonomy ==
Kyphosus cornelii was first formally described in 1944 by the Australian ichthyologist Gilbert Percy Whitley (1903-1975) with the type locality given as the Houtman Abrolhos archipelago in Western Australia.

=== Etymology ===
The specific name commemorates the Dutch apothecary, mutineer and murderer Jeronimus Cornelisz (1598-1691) who was shipwrecked on the merchant ship Batavia on the Houtman Abrolhos and subsequently prosecuted and executed for his murderous leadership of his fellow shipwreck survivors on the islands.

== Distribution ==
Kyphosus cornelii is endemic to the western coast of Western Australia where it is found from Shark Bay in the north to Cape Naturaliste in the south.

== Description ==
In Western Australia

Kyphosus cornelii is similar to the silver drummer (K. sydneyanus) but it has a slender body shape when compared to other drummer species. The rear edge of the pectoral fins is an orange-yellow colour. The upper and lower margins of the caudal fin have a pale margin with a dusky submarginal bar. The main difference from the silver drummer is the more distinctly forked tail and the pale caudal fin margin and the suborbital dark moustache. It attains a maximum total length of 70 centimetres (28 in).

== Biology ==
In Western Australia

Kyphosus cornelii is found on coral and rock reefs at depths of 20 metres (66 ft) in inshore waters.

=== Diet and feeding ===
It feeds largely on seaweed, especially red algae. They are territorial and defend a patch of seaweed, gardening the patch to keep the seaweed short so that they can see other Western buffalo bream. The fish will steal food from other patches of other fish, especially if the seaweed grows too tall. It can occur in mixed schools with silver drummers.
