= Gladius sea chub =

Scientific classification
- Kingdom: Animalia
- Phylum: Chordata
- Class: Actinopterygii
- Division: Teleostei
- Order: Centrarchiformes
- Family: Kyphosidae
- Genus: Kyphosus
- Species: K. gladius

Binomial name
- Kyphosus gladius Knudsen & Clements, 2013

Species of fish

The Gladius sea chub (Kyphosus gladius) is a species of marine ray-finned fish, a sea chub in the family Kyphosidae. It was recognised a new species in 2013 and is found in the southeastern Indian Ocean where endemic to the southern coasts of Western Australia.

== Description ==
Kyphosus gladius has an elongated, elliptically-shaped body with a terminal mouth and a short head. There are 55-64 scales in the lateral line of which 44-55 are pored. The caudal peduncle is long and shallow. Most of the head and body is covered in large, ctenoid scales. The continuous dorsal fin has 10 - 11 spines and 11-12 soft rays and the short-based anal fin has 3 spines and 11-12 soft rays. The overall colour is silvery to metallic bluish, the gill cover has a vertical green bar near its rear and the back is darker than the underparts, although this is not seen as counter-shading. The standard length of the largest fish measured is 45.7 centimetres (18.0 in).

== Distribution ==
Kyphosus gladius is found in the southeastern Indian Ocean where it is endemic to the southern coasts of Western Australia. The distribution runs from the Houtman Abrolhos to Albany.

== Habitat and biology ==
Kyphosus gladius occurs over rocky substrates down to depths of 20 metres (66 ft). It will form mixed schools with Kyphosus bigibbus and Kyphosus sydneyanus.

== Taxonomy ==
Kyphosus gladius was described in 2013 by Steen Wilhelm Knudsen and Kendall D. Clements with the type locality given as Canal Rocks, Yallingup Reef, Western Australia. It has previously been confused with K. sydneyanus, Knudsen and Clements showed that this was a separate species, although previously another species named Kyphosus klunzingeri has been named from Western Australia but this is now regarded as a nomen dubium.
