= Kyphosus sandwicensis =

Scientific classification
- Kingdom: Animalia
- Phylum: Chordata
- Class: Actinopterygii
- Order: Centrarchiformes
- Family: Kyphosidae
- Genus: Kyphosus
- Species: K. sandwicensis

Binomial name
- Kyphosus sandwicensis (Sauvage, 1880)

Species of fish

Kyphosus sandwicensis, commonly called grey chub, Pacific chub or nenue in Hawaiʻi, is found throughout the central Pacific and Hawaiʻi.

== Description ==
K. sandwicensis is a silver-colored fish. It has an elongated/football shape. It has a beak-shaped mouth and a faint yellow area on its face. Subspecies found throughout Hawaii may have white spots scattered across its body, while others have a darker gray complexion. In some cases, they can be yellow. The nenue can grow up to thirty inches long and live at depths of three feet to thirty feet.

== Distribution and habitat ==
K. sandwicensis can be found throughout the Western Pacific and throughout the Hawaiian Islands. These fish can be seen swimming in schools of as few as ten or hundreds individuals. Nenue also live in rock structures with pockets for them to evade predators.

== Human use ==
Nenue can be caught using line and hook, spear, or by net.

It can be prepared as poke, a local Hawaiian dish consisting of raw fish and some seasonings or as sushi or sashimi. It can be grilled whole, then the skin peeled back and eaten. Nenue has a mild taste with a slight hint of limu or seaweed (also part of this fish's diet).
