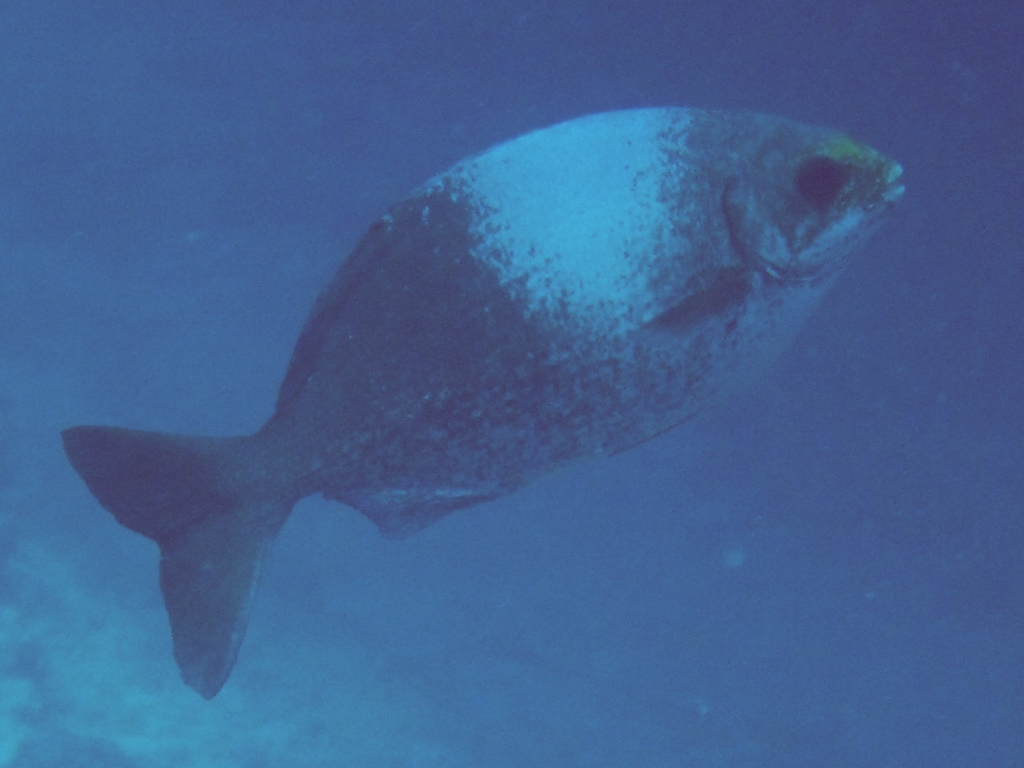
- At Midway Atoll

Scientific classification
- Kingdom: Animalia
- Phylum: Chordata
- Class: Actinopterygii
- Division: Teleostei
- Order: Centrarchiformes
- Family: Kyphosidae
- Genus: Kyphosus
- Species: K. hawaiiensis

Binomial name
- Kyphosus hawaiiensis K. Sakai & Nakabo, 2004

= Hawaiian chub =

Species of fish

The Hawaiian chub (Kyphosus hawaiiensis), also known as the insular rudderfish or bicolor chub, is a species of marine ray-finned fish, a sea chub belonging to the family Kyphosidae. This species is found in the Central Pacific Ocean.

== Taxonomy ==
The Hawaiian chub was first formally described in 2004 by the Japanese marine biologists Keiichi Sakai and Tetsuji Nakabo with the type locality given as Kaupoa on Molokai Island in the Hawaiian Islands. This species was previously thought to be possibly conspecific with the brown chub (K. bigibbus) but that species does not occur in the Hawaiian Islands and the Hawaiian chub and the brown chub differ in their morphologies. Another species, the gray chub (Kyphosus pacificus), which was also formerly considered to be within the brown chub was described at the same time but it is a more widespread species than the Hawaiian chub.

== Distribution and habitat ==
The Hawaiian chub is restricted to the Central Pacific Ocean, where it is found in the waters around the Hawaiian Islands and probably the Line Islands. It is found at depths of greater than 1 m (3 ft 3 in) in the vicinity of rocky and coral reefs within the intertidal and subtidal zone.

== Description ==
In Hawaii

At Midway Atoll

The Hawaiian chub is similar to the gray chub but differs in color. It is a similar bluish-gray basic color, but the Hawaiian chub darkens towards the tail, forming a distinct two-tone pattern. There are 11 spines and 12 soft rays in the dorsal fin and 3 spines and 11 soft rays in the anal fin. The body is oval, deep and highly compressed with a terminal mouth containing incisor-like teeth. This species reaches a maximum total length of 41 cm (16 in).

== Behavior ==
The Hawaiian chub lives in small schools in the surge zone on the top of reefs and in dropoffs where it may be encountered in the same places over a number of years, suggesting that these schools are territorial.
