= Rapa Nui (disambiguation) =

Rapa Nui is the native name for Easter Island.

Rapa Nui may also refer to:

- Rapa Nui language, the indigenous language of Easter Island
- Rapa Nui mythology, the mythology of the indigenous inhabitants of Easter Island
- Rapa Nui people, the native Polynesian inhabitants of Easter Island
- Rapa-Nui (film), 1994
- CF Rapa Nui, a Chilean association football team representing Easter Island
- Rapa Nui Calendar, a calendar used by Rapa Nui People
- Rapa Nui Tattooing, a method of tattooing used by Rapa Nui People

== Fishes ==
- Rapanui Octopus, a Octopus that lives in Rapa Nui
- Rapanui Nibbler, a fish that lives in Rapa Nui

== Places ==
- Rapa Nui National Park the Chilean National Park which incorporates most of Easter Island
- Rapanui Rock, also known as Shag Rock, a sea stack near Sumner, New Zealand
- Rapa Nui Point, a geological formation in Antarctica
