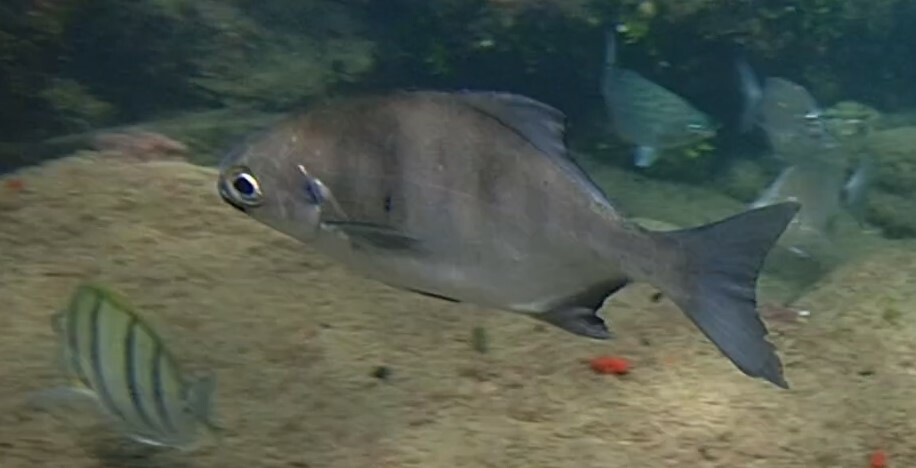

Scientific classification
- Kingdom: Animalia
- Phylum: Chordata
- Class: Actinopterygii
- Order: Centrarchiformes
- Suborder: Terapontoidei
- Family: Kyphosidae
- Genus: Neoscorpis; J. L. B. Smith, 1931
- Species: N. lithophilus

Binomial name
- Neoscorpis lithophilus (Gilchrist & W. W. Thompson, 1908)

Synonyms
- Scorpis lithophilus Gilchrist & W. W. Thompson, 1908

= Stone bream =

Species of ray-finned fish

The stone bream (Neoscorpis lithophilus) is a species of marine ray-finned fish, a sea chub from the family Kyphosidae, which is native to the Indian Ocean coast of Africa where it can be found along rocky coasts from Mozambique to South Africa. This species grows to a length of 50 centimetres (20 in) SL though most do not exceed 18 centimetres (7.1 in). The greatest recorded weight for this fish is 2.6 kilograms (5.7 lb). This species is commercially important and is also popular as a game fish. This species is the only known member of its genus.

== Anatomy & morphology ==
The stone bream is a fast growing fish. They can live at least 10 years. The max recorded length of the stone-bream is about 50 centimetres although the most common size for this fish is typically 18 centimetres long. An adult stone bream can reach up to 27 cm and can weigh around 2.6 kg.

The stone bream is often blue and silver in color. Each stone bream has anywhere from 6-8 dorsal fins and 20-25 dorsal soft rays. They are also equipped with 3 anal spines and around 20-26 anal soft rays. They have very small mouths. Like other species in the Kyphosid family, Neoscorpis lithophilus has two distinct rows of teeth. The front row contains 34 flat and sharp frontal teeth within their jaws. The second row of smaller sharp teeth protrudes from behind the first row of teeth. Their mouth contains around 3460 taste buds.

== Habitat & distribution ==
The stone bream can be found mainly in the Western Indian Ocean where it is native in the subtropical regions from 25°S - 35°S, 18°E - 34°E. The stone bream is found along the African coast from Inhaca in Mozambique to False Bay in South Africa, it also occurs along the eastern coast of Madagascar. Stone breams tend to gather in shallow tropical waters as opposed to deep waters. They tend to be desmeral, meaning that they tend to live at the bottom of the sea floor. They feed off of macro-algae found at the bottom of the oceans.

== Behavior ==
Stone breams are mainly herbivores, meaning that their diet is composed of marine plants like macro-algae. Their diet consists of red algae and other sea plants. Because of this, they tend to dwell in shallow, rocky waters, feeding off of many different kinds of plants. Stone breams become sexually mature at fork lengths of 260 millimetres (10 in) for males and 290 millimetres (11 in) for females, when they are 3 to 4 years of age. Spawning takes place in midwinter, July to January, but little is known about the subsequent development of the larvae. A tagging study off South Africa found that a relatively low number of tagged fish are recovered which suggests that this species is somewhat nomadic. However, it is thought that, as is typical for reef fishes, this species is more likely to be sedentary.

== Taxonomy ==
The stone bream is a member of the family Kyphosidae. Some authorities include the stone bream in a Kyphosidae family which is divided into two different genera: Kyphosus and Neoscorpis. The genus Neoscorpis is monospecific, i.e. it contains only one known species which is Neoscorpis lithophilus. The 5th edition of Fishes of the World retains Neoscorpis in the subfamily Scorpidinae, while other authorities place this species in the Kyphosidae sensu stricto. The stone bream was first formally described in 1908 as Scorpis lithophilus by the Scottish zoologist John Gilchrist and his South African born colleague William Wardlaw Thompson with the type locality given as the Natal coast. In 1931 J. L. B. Smith transferred the stone bream into the monospecific genus Neoscorpis.

== Human interaction ==
The stone-bream does not contain any known threat to humans. They are fished mainly in the African regions for recreational purposes. Although they are caught recreationally, they are not overfished. Only those with special permits are allowed to catch them. Sale of the stone bream by recreational fishers is illegal in South Africa.

== Conservation status ==
The status of the stone bream has not yet been evaluated by the International Union for Conservation of Nature. It was listed as "least concern" in the 2018 National Biodiversity Assessment by the South African National Biodiversity Institute.
