= Bluefish (disambiguation) =

A bluefish is a type of fish (Pomatomus saltatrix). It may also refer to:

== Other species ==
- New Zealand bluefish (Girella cyanea), another species of fish
- Sablefish (Anoplopoma fimbria), a species of fish commonly known as bluefish in the UK

== Localities ==
- Bluefish Caves, archaeological site in Yukon, Canada

== Organisations ==
- Bridgeport Bluefish, a defunct baseball team in Connecticut, United States

== Ships ==
Two ships of the United States Navy have borne the name Bluefish, after the bluefish (Pomatomus saltatrix):

- The USS Bluefish (SS-222), was a Gato-class submarine, commissioned in 1943 and struck in 1959.
- The USS Bluefish (SSN-675), was a Sturgeon-class submarine, commissioned in 1971 and struck in 1996.

== Software ==
- Bluefish (software), an advanced text editor.
