= Kyphosis (disambiguation) =

The medical term kyphosis has several meanings :

- this one of a deformity, where the back is bowed (see kyphosis article for more details);
- another of a term describing the normally convex (arched, kyphotic) segments of the spine, also called primary curvatures;
- when related to a single vertebra, a term describing the angle created between the superior and inferior endplates.

See also kyphosus.
