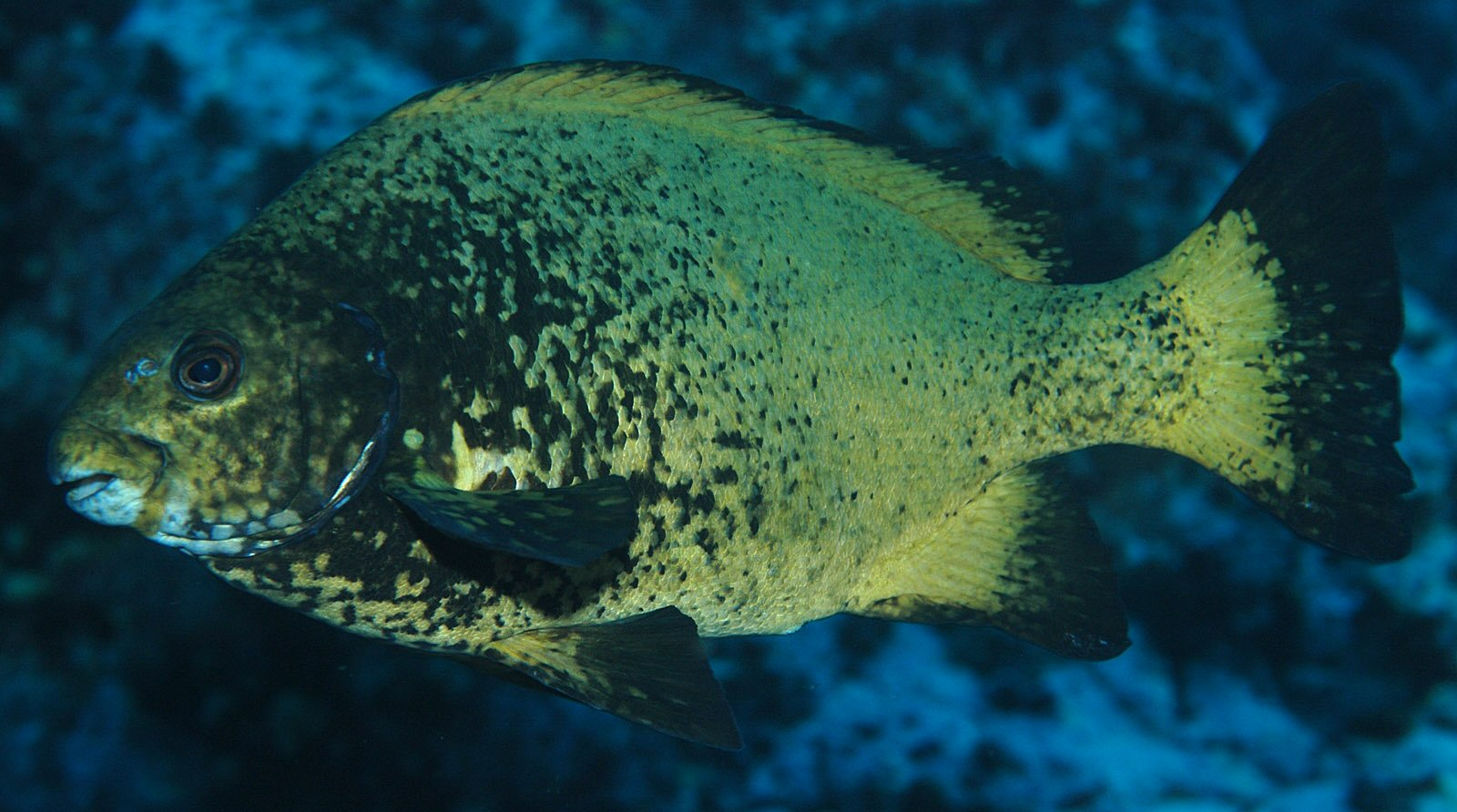
- Caramel drummer (G. fimbriata)

Scientific classification
- Kingdom: Animalia
- Phylum: Chordata
- Class: Actinopterygii
- Division: Teleostei
- Order: Centrarchiformes
- Family: Girellidae
- Genus: Girella; J. E. Gray, 1835

Type species
- Girella punctata J. E. Gray, 1835

Synonyms
- List: Aplodon Thominot, 1883; Camarina Ayres, 1860; Doidyxodon Valenciennes, 1846; Girellichthys Klunzinger, 1872; Girellipiscis Whitley, 1931; Girellops Regan, 1913; Incisidens T. N. Gill, 1862; Iredalella Whitley, 1931; Melambaphes Günther, 1863; Melanychthys Temminck & Schlegel, 1844; Neotephraeops Castelnau, 1872; Tephraeops Günther, 1859

= Girella =

Genus of ray-finned fishes

Girella is a genus of ray-finned fish mostly native to the Pacific Ocean with a smaller presence in the Atlantic oceans.

== Species ==
Species	Common name	Images
Girella albostriata Steindachner, 1898	Juan Fernández nibbler	
Girella cyanea W. J. Macleay, 1881	Blue drummer	
Girella elevata W. J. Macleay, 1881	Black drummer, rock blackfish	
Girella feliciana H. W. Clark, 1938		
Girella fimbriata (McCulloch, 1920)	Caramel drummer	
Girella freminvillii (Valenciennes, 1846)		
Girella laevifrons (Tschudi, 1846)		
Girella leonina (J. Richardson, 1846)	Blackedge nibbler	
Girella melanichthys (Richardson, 1846)		
Girella mezina D. S. Jordan & Starks, 1907	Mezina nibbler	
Girella nebulosa Kendall & Radcliffe, 1912	Rapanui nibbler	
Girella nigricans (Ayres, 1860)	Opaleye	
Girella punctata J. E. Gray, 1835	Smallscale blackfish	
Girella simplex (Richardson, 1848)		
Girella simplicidens R. C. Osburn & Nichols, 1916	Gulf opaleye	
Girella stuebeli Troschel, 1866		
Girella tephraeops (J. Richardson, 1846)	Western rock blackfish	
Girella tricuspidata (Quoy & Gaimard, 1824)	Parore, luderick	
Girella zebra (J. Richardson, 1846)	Zebra fish	
Girella zonata Günther, 1859		
