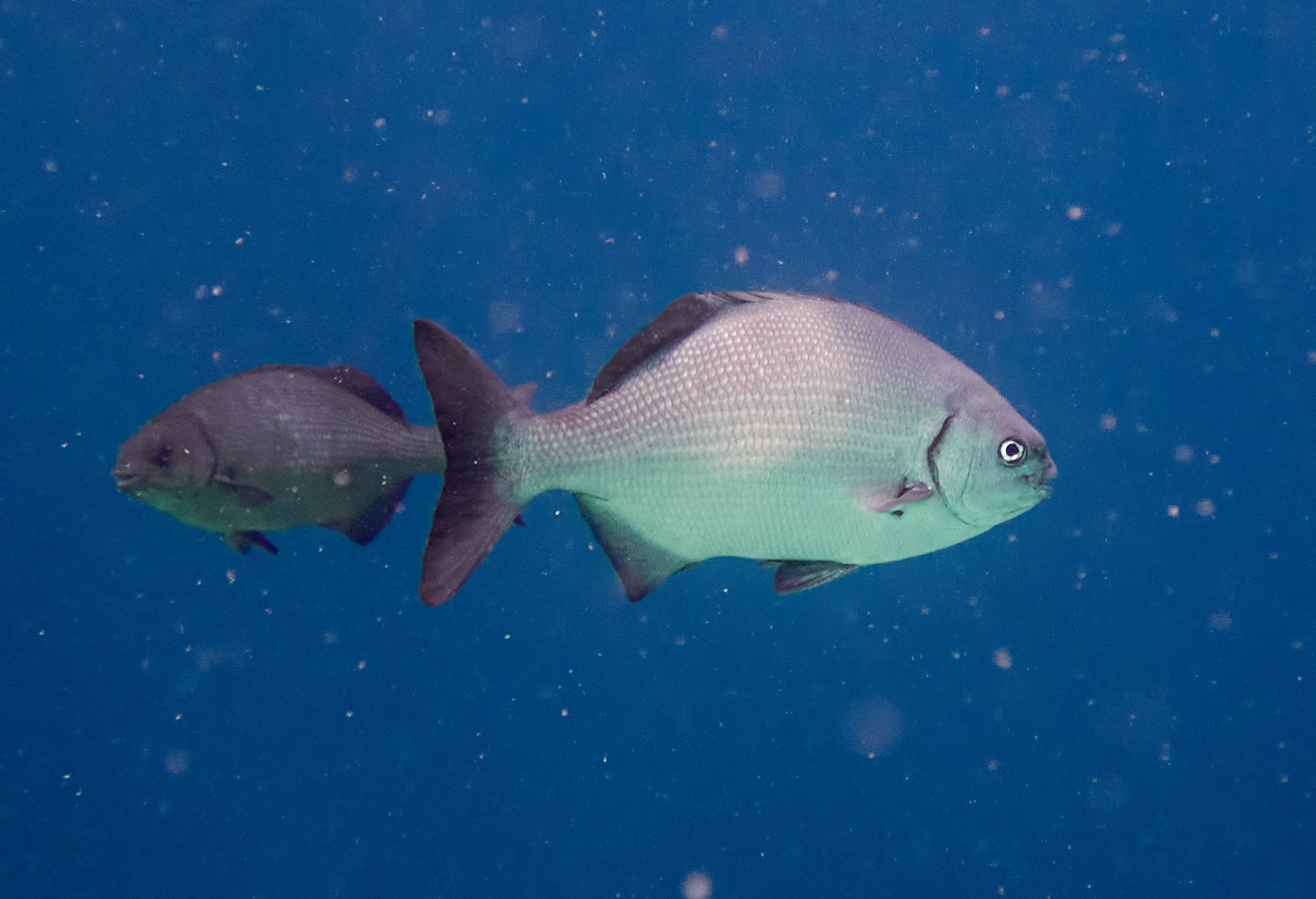

Conservation status
- Least Concern (IUCN 3.1)

Scientific classification
- Kingdom: Animalia
- Phylum: Chordata
- Class: Actinopterygii
- Division: Teleostei
- Order: Centrarchiformes
- Family: Kyphosidae
- Genus: Kyphosus
- Species: K. sectatrix

Binomial name
- Kyphosus sectatrix (Carolus Linnaeus, 1758)

Synonyms
- Perca sectatrix Linnaeus, 1758; Kyphosus atlanticus Sakai & Nakabo, 2014; see taxonomy

= Kyphosus sectatrix =

Species of fish

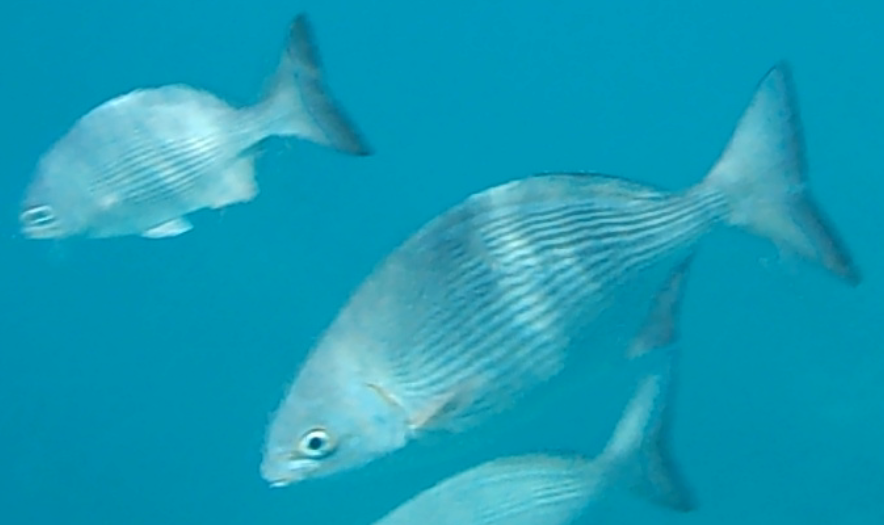
A shot of 3 Bermuda chub seen off the coast of Islamorada, Florida.

Kyphosus sectatrix, the Bermuda chub, Pacific drummer, beaked chub, grey drummer, Pacific chub or white chub, is a species of marine ray-finned fish, a sea chub from the family Kyphosidae. This species is found in tropical and subtropical coastal waters worldwide. It has had a confused taxonomic history dating back to Linnaeus's naming of the species in 1758.

== Description ==
Kyphosus sectatrix has an elliptical body which is almost circular when looked at from the side, with a head that slopes from over the eye to the snout, making the fish appear to be beaked or snouted. It lacks an obvious bulge on its forehead and it has a small, horizontal mouth which opens at the front. There is a regular row of incisorform J-shaped teeth with rounded tips which are set close together in the jaws which have their bases set horizontally creating something like a bony plate with radial striations within the mouth. Ctenoid scales cover most of the body apart from the snout. The dorsal fin is continuous, and has its origin quite far to the rear of the head and longer than the anal fin. The dorsal fin contains 11 spines and 11–12 soft rays while the anal fin has 3 spines and 11 soft rays. The caudal fin is emarginate but not deeply so. The lateral line has 63–81 scales of which 50–62 have pores. This species may attain a maximum total length of 76 centimetres (30 in); a total length of around 50 centimetres (20 in) is more common. The maximum weight attained is 6 kilograms (13 lb).

The colour of this species can be variable, normally it is greenish to bronze dorsally fading to pale greyish on the flanks and to silvery ventrally. There are faint gold horizontal lines on the body and there is frequently a white or silvery streak on the cheek below the eye, and a narrow pale stripe below the dorsal fin base. Sometimes individuals which are bright yellow in colour occur and these often have blotches or patches of black along with areas of paler yellow or whitish colour. The juveniles are grey and have white or pale spots on their bodies and fins.

== Distribution ==
Kyphosus sectatrix has a circumglobal distribution and is found in the warmer areas of all the world's oceans. In the eastern Atlantic Ocean it has been recorded from St Helena and Ascension Island the Azores, the Canary Islands, it has been reported from the Algarve in Portugal and there are records from the Mediterranean. In the western Atlantic it is found off Bermuda, in the Sargasso Sea, in the Gulf of Mexico and the Caribbean Sea. It has been recorded from the Trindade Islands of Brazil. It is thought likely that it occurs along the coast of northwest Africa and as far north as Portugal. In the Indian Ocean it has been recorded from Réunion and Indonesia but likely is far more widespread and probably occurs along the eastern African coast into the Red Sea and along the southern Asian coast. In the western Pacific it has been recorded from southern Japan to the Coral Sea and northern New Zealand and the Kermadec Islands, along the eastern coast of Australia from Heron Island, Queensland to Ulladulla, New South Wales and in the Tasman Sea from Norfolk Island and Lord Howe Island. It extends across the Pacific through Polynesia to Hawaii and at least as far east as the Revillagigedo Islands.

== Habitat and biology ==
Kyphosus sectatrix forms schools, often mixed with other related species, on shallow reefs, frequently these are observed in the surge zone but it also occurs above algal reefs and in seagrass beds, over sandy and rocky substrates, and reef flats. Juveniles commonly shelter among floating rafts of Sargassum and this allows them to disperse over vast distances. This is an omnivorous species which feeds mostly on benthic algae and also on as well as on small crabs and molluscs. Off the Fernando de Noronha Archipelago in the southeast Atlantic it has been observed feeding on the faeces and vomit of spinner dolphins (Stenella spp) and this feeding off mammalian waste has been suggested to be simple behavioural change from feeding on plankton to picking out drifting particles of waste. When feeding on algae they appear to prefer brown algae.

== Taxonomy ==
Kyphosus sectatrix was first formally described and named as Perca saltatrix by Linnaeus in 1758 but changed it to Perca sectatrix in 1766 as he had intended to base the name on Mark Catesby's previous name for the "rudderfish" Perca marina sectatrix and the uses of salatatrix had been a lapsus. Given the circumglobal distribution of this species and the difficulty of identification a number of names have been assigned to populations around the world which have since been shown by morphological and molecular studies to be junior synonyms of K. sectatrix. These include Kyphosus pacificus which was described in 2004 as distinct from Kyphosus bigibbus in the Pacific but the workers did not compare K. pacificus with any specimens from the Atlantic. Another synonym is K. lutescens from the Revillagigedo Islands which was named by David Starr Jordan and Charles Henry Gilbert in 1889 and based on yellow specimens taken there but this taxon is also probably a junior synonym of K. sectatrix.
