= Silver drummer =

- In New Zealand

Scientific classification
- Kingdom: Animalia
- Phylum: Chordata
- Class: Actinopterygii
- Division: Teleostei
- Order: Centrarchiformes
- Family: Kyphosidae
- Genus: Kyphosus
- Species: K. sydneyanus

Binomial name
- Kyphosus sydneyanus (Günther, 1886)

Synonyms
- List: Pimelepterus sydneyanus Günther, 1886; Pimelepterus meridionalis Ogilby, 1887; Cridorsa moonta Whitley, 1938; Kyphosus diemenensis E.O.G. Scott, 1971

Species of fish

The silver drummer (Kyphosus sydneyanus), also known as the buff bream, buffalo bream, buffs, common buffalo bream, drummer bream, Southern silver drummer or Sydney drummer, is a species of marine ray-finned fish, a sea chub from the family Kyphosidae. It is found in the southeastern Indian Ocean and the southwestern Pacific Ocean off Australia and New Zealand where it is found in shallow water near rocky reefs.

== Taxonomy ==
The silver drummer was first formally described as Pimelepterus sydneyanus in 1886 by the British-German ichthyologist and herpetologist Albert Günther (1830-1914) with the type locality given as Port Jackson, New South Wales.

== Distribution ==
The silver drummer is found in the south-eastern Indian Ocean and the south western Pacific Ocean off Australia and New Zealand.

In Australia its range is in the southern part of the continent where it occurs from Shark Bay in Western Australia, south to the southern coast of the continent, east to Tasmania and north to Fraser Island in Queensland. It is also found in the Tasman Sea around Lord Howe Island and Norfolk Island. In New Zealand it has been found as far south as Jackson Bay on the west coast of South Island but it is only really common around the North Island. Records from the islands in the Tasman Sea are probably misidentifications for Kyphosus bigibbus.

== Description ==
In South Australia

In New Zealand

The silver drummer has an oval to circular when viewed from the side which is not compressed; the dorsal profile of the head is sloping between the area between the eyes and the snout with a characteristic bulging head profile. It has a continual dorsal fin which as a spiny anterior part and a soft-rayed posterior part, the spiny part being normally more than half as long again as the soft-rayed part. There are 10-11 spines and 11-12 soft rays in the dorsal fin while the anal fin has 2-3 spines and 10-12 soft rays. There is a total of 52-66 scales in the lateral line of which 42-56 are pored. It has a short caudal peduncle, a slightly emarginate caudal fin which has slightly rounded lobes. This is a large species which attains a maximum total length of 80 centimetres (31 in) and a maximum weight of 1.1 kilograms (2.4 lb).

The ground colour can be olive, silvery-grey or bronzy usually darker above and paler below. There is a broad dark margin on the caudal fin and a reddish-brown bar which runs from the upper jaw over the operculum, there is also a pale bar beneath its eye and a small black spot on the ventral margin of the base of the pectoral fin.

== Habitat and biology ==
The silver drummer is occasionally recorded as solitary individuals but normally congregates in large schools, these may be mixed with other species dependent on location. The mixed schools may include with K. gladius and K. bigibbus in Western Australia or just with K. bigibbus in eastern Australia and northern New Zealand. Its diet is mainly composed of phaeophytes, typically Ecklonia radiata, and rhodophytes. K. sydneyanus has a highly vascularised hing gut chamber, which is separated by a sphincter. This is where the majority of microbial fermentation occurs. The microbial fermentation allows the fish to properly digest phaeophytes.

== Fisheries ==
The silver drummer is regarded as a fish which puts up a good fight when caught by the angler and is therefore popular. However, most people consider its flesh to be inedible.
