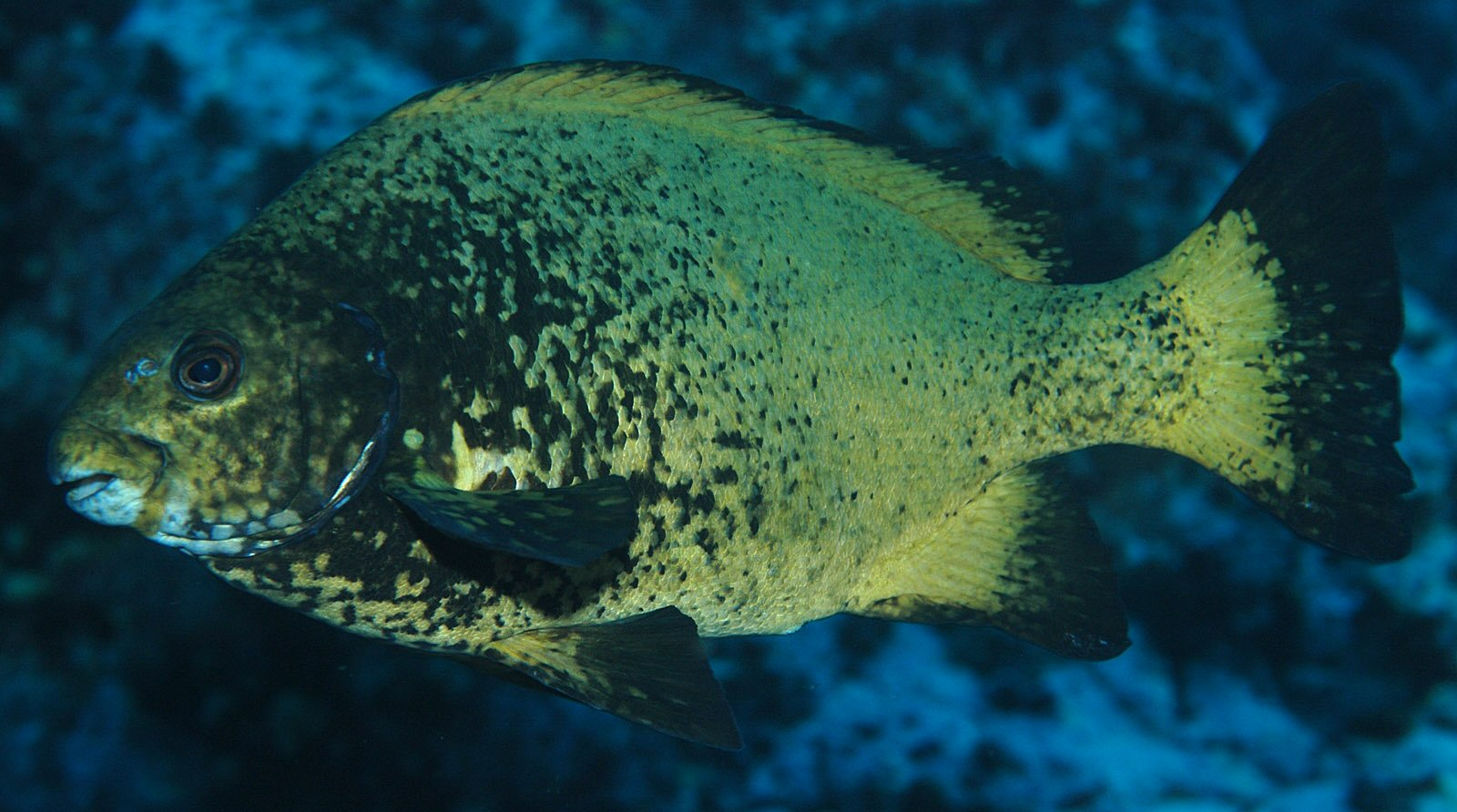

Scientific classification
- Domain: Eukaryota
- Kingdom: Animalia
- Phylum: Chordata
- Class: Actinopterygii
- Order: Centrarchiformes
- Family: Girellidae
- Genus: Girella
- Species: G. fimbriata

Binomial name
- Girella fimbriata (McCulloch, 1920)

Synonyms
- Girellops fimbriatus McCulloch, 1920

= Girella fimbriata =

Species of ray-finned fish

Girella fimbriata, the caramel drummer, is a species of ray-finned fish endemic to the waters around the Kermadec Islands on reefs at a depth of about 6 metres (20 ft). This species can reach a length of 36 centimetres (14 in) TL.
