= Tubbia =

Scientific classification
- Kingdom: Animalia
- Phylum: Chordata
- Class: Actinopterygii
- Order: Scombriformes
- Family: Centrolophidae
- Genus: Tubbia; Whitley, 1943

Type species
- Tubbia tasmanica Whitley, 1943

Genus of ray-finned fishes

Tubbia, is a genus of ray-finned fish in the family Centrolophidae.

== Species ==
There are currently 2 recognized species in this genus:

- Tubbia stewarti Last, R. K. Daley & Duhamel, 2013 (Seamount rudderfish)
- Tubbia tasmanica Whitley, 1943 (Tasmanian ruffe)
