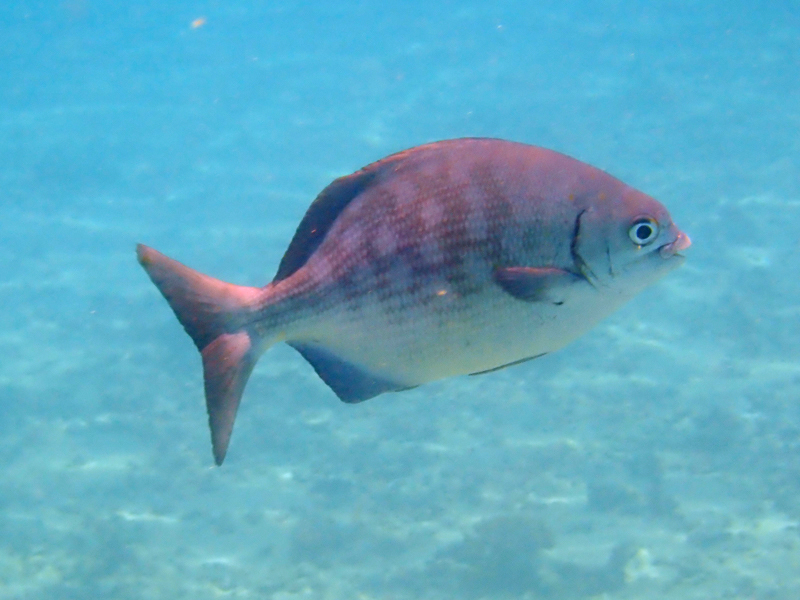
- In Coiba National Park, Panama

Conservation status
- Least Concern (IUCN 3.1)

Scientific classification
- Kingdom: Animalia
- Phylum: Chordata
- Class: Actinopterygii
- Division: Teleostei
- Order: Centrarchiformes
- Family: Kyphosidae
- Genus: Kyphosus
- Species: K. elegans

Binomial name
- Kyphosus elegans (W. K. H. Peters, 1869)

Synonyms
- Pimelepterus elegans Peters, 1869

= Kyphosus elegans =

Cortez sea chub

Species of fish

Kyphosus elegans, the Chopa Mojonera or Cortez chub, is a species of marine ray-finned fish, a sea chub from the family Kyphosidae. It is found in the eastern Pacific Ocean where it is of minor importance to commercial fisheries.

== Taxonomy ==
Kyphosus elegans was first formally described as Pimelepterus elegans in 1869 by Wilhelm Peters from a type purchased in Mazatlán, Sinaloa, western Mexico. In 1880 Henri Émile Sauvage described a species of Kyphosus from Hawaii from specimens which had been sent to him by a French consul there and named it as Kyphosus sandvicensis but there appears to have been a mix up as his description does not match the type specimen lodged in the Muséum national d'histoire naturelle in Paris and recent workers have found that K. sandvicensis is a junior synonym of K. elegans, although Fishbase still treats it as a valid species, with a note that it is a synonym of K. elegans.

== Distribution ==
Kyphosus elegans is found in the eastern Pacific Ocean from the Gulf of California to Panama, it also occurs in the Galapagos, and other eastern Pacific islands.

== Description ==
In Ecuador

In Hawaii

Kyphosus elegans has an oval, laterally compressed body with a small head and a pointed snout, the forehead slopes steeply in front of the eyes. The mouth is small and when closed the maxilla are partially hidden beneath the preorbital bones. The teeth are very characteristic and form a single row in the front of both jaws, they are incisiform and have a rather lanceolate shape, resembling the head of a hockey stick, they have compressed roots and they are set horizontally, creating a striated plate within the oral cavity, There are teeth on the vomer too. The dorsal fin is continuous, the front part contains 10-11 spines which can be folded into a groove which is covered in scales, the rear part has 13 soft rays. with the first few rays being higher than the rest. The anal fin has 2-3 spines and 12 soft with the longest rays being at the front and these are half the length of the base of the anal fin. The caudal fin is forked. Much of the body is covered in small, thick, rough scales except for a patch between the eyes. The lateral line contains 61-69 scales, of which 52-57 have pores.

The body may be silvery in colour or it can be bronze or brown, they may also show a mottled pattern of white spots over the body. The mottle pattern is more commonly seen in fish demonstrating territorial behaviour. The tail is dusky. This species has a maximum total length of 53 centimetres (21 in), although a more common total length is 25 centimetres (9.8 in).

== Habitat and biology ==
Kyphosus elegans is a coastal fish, the adults are found on reef flats or on reefs, while the juveniles are often found in tidal pools. It sometimes forms mixed schools with Kyphosus analogus and also with Prionurus laticlavius, with which it also grazes. This species feeds mainly on attached algae and will occasionally eat plankton and benthic invertebrates. An analysis of the somach contents of sampled specimens indicated that Sargassum is the main algae eaten. It is the host of several ectoparasites such as Caligus chamelensis, C. latigenitalis, C. mutabilis or C. serratus.

== Fisheries ==
Kyphosus elegans is considered important for commercial fisheries in the Gulf of Montijo in Panama.

== See also ==
- List of least concern fishes
