= Tasmanian ruffe =

Scientific classification
- Kingdom: Animalia
- Phylum: Chordata
- Class: Actinopterygii
- Order: Scombriformes
- Family: Centrolophidae
- Genus: Tubbia
- Species: T. tasmanica

Binomial name
- Tubbia tasmanica Whitley, 1943

Synonyms
- Mupus tasmanica (Whitley, 1943)

Species of ray-finned fish

The Tasmanian ruffe, Tubbia tasmanica, is a medusafish of the family Centrolophidae, found in temperate waters in the Indian and southwest Pacific Oceans, at depths of between 700 and 850 m. Its length is up to 67 cm.
