= Girella leonina =

Scientific classification
- Kingdom: Animalia
- Phylum: Chordata
- Class: Actinopterygii
- Order: Centrarchiformes
- Family: Girellidae
- Genus: Girella
- Species: G. leonina

Binomial name
- Girella leonina (Richardson, 1846)

Synonyms
- Crenidens leoninus Richardson, 1846

Species of ray-finned fish

Girella leonina is a species of ray-finned fish in the family Girellidae, native to the Western Central Pacific in areas from Hong Kong to Japan, in waters 1 to 15 meters (3.3 to 49.2 ft) deep, in shallow rocky reefs.

== Description and feeding ==
Girella leonina grows up to 46 centimeters in length with a blackish coloring. Its diet is made up of plants and prymnesiophyceae.
