= Girella nebulosa =

Scientific classification
- Kingdom: Animalia
- Phylum: Chordata
- Class: Actinopterygii
- Order: Centrarchiformes
- Family: Girellidae
- Genus: Girella
- Species: G. nebulosa

Binomial name
- Girella nebulosa (Kendall & Radcliffe, 1912)

Synonyms
- Girellops nebulosus (Kendall & Radcliffe, 1912)

Species of ray-finned fish

Girella nebulosa, the Rapanui nibbler, is a species of ray-finned fish within the family Girellidae. It is found in the Southeast Pacific off Easter Island, and can grow up to a length of 30 centimeters.
