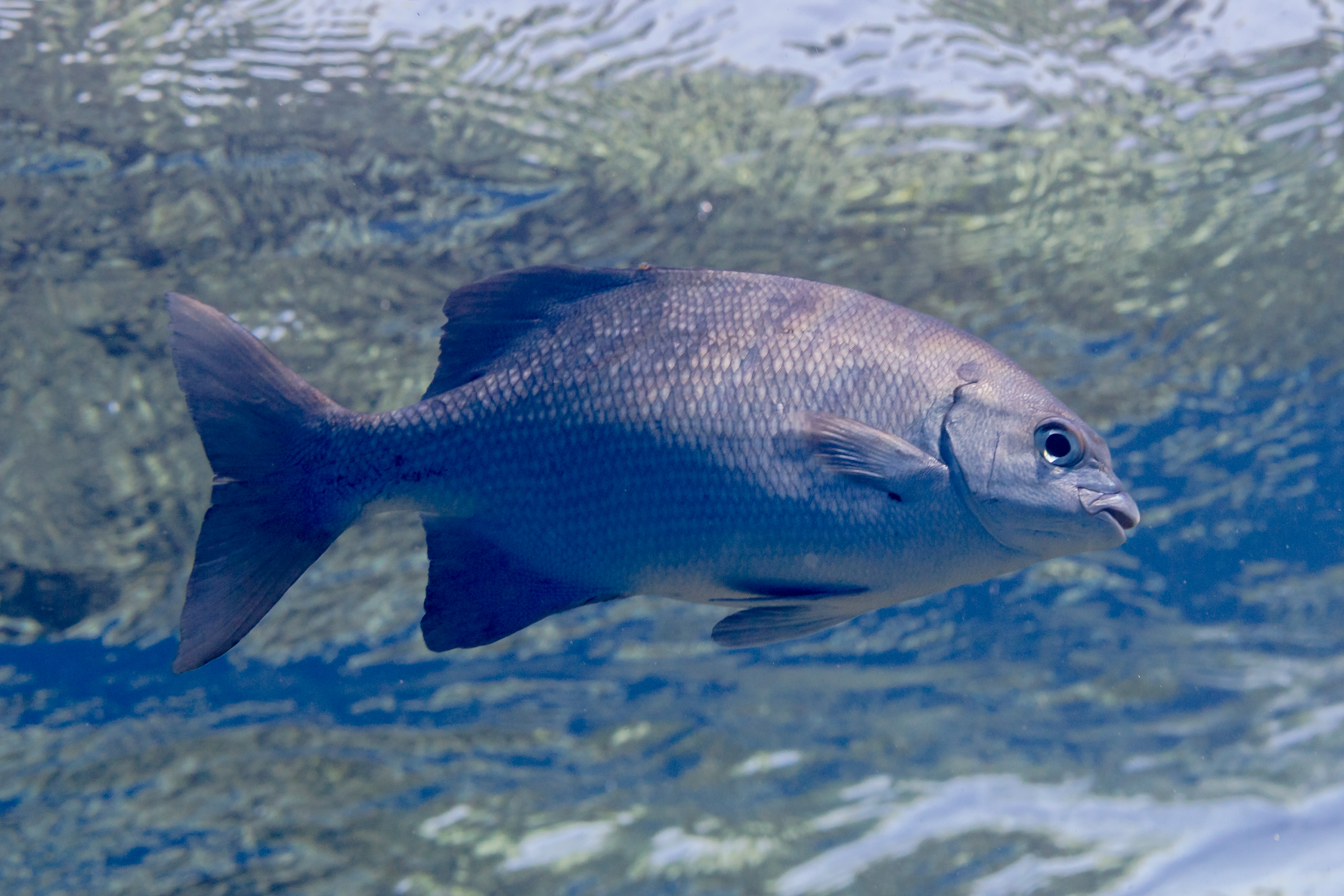
- In the Red Sea

Conservation status
- Least Concern (IUCN 3.1)

Scientific classification
- Kingdom: Animalia
- Phylum: Chordata
- Class: Actinopterygii
- Division: Teleostei
- Order: Centrarchiformes
- Family: Kyphosidae
- Genus: Kyphosus
- Species: K. cinerascens

Binomial name
- Kyphosus cinerascens Forsskål, 1775

= Kyphosus cinerascens =

Species of fish

Kyphosus cinerascens, commonly known as the blue sea chub or blue-bronze chub, is a species of marine ray-finned fish in the family Kyphosidae.

== Distribution and habitat ==
This species occurs throughout the Indo-Pacific region, including the Hawaiian Islands, in tropical and subtropical waters.

It is commonly found over hard, algal-covered substrates in exposed reef environments, loagoons, and seaward reefs.

== Description ==
It is characterized by a single continuous dorsal fin with 11 spines and 12–14 soft rays, and an anal fin with 3 spines and 11–13 soft rays. Adults can reach up to 45 centimetres (18 in) in length and are typically blue-grey, brown, or black in coloration. The body is relatively deep and oval-shaped, with faint longitudinal lines formed by rows of scales.

== Diet ==
Primarily herbivores, they mostly feed on phaeophytes, chlorophytes, and rhodophytes. Their grazing activity may contribute to controlling and maintaining reef health.

== Behavior ==
This species is generally diurnal and is often observed in schools of 10 or more individuals along reef habitats. At night, individuals are typically observed alone, remaining close to the seafloor, sometimes at depths of 24–45 metres (79–148 ft).

== Gallery ==
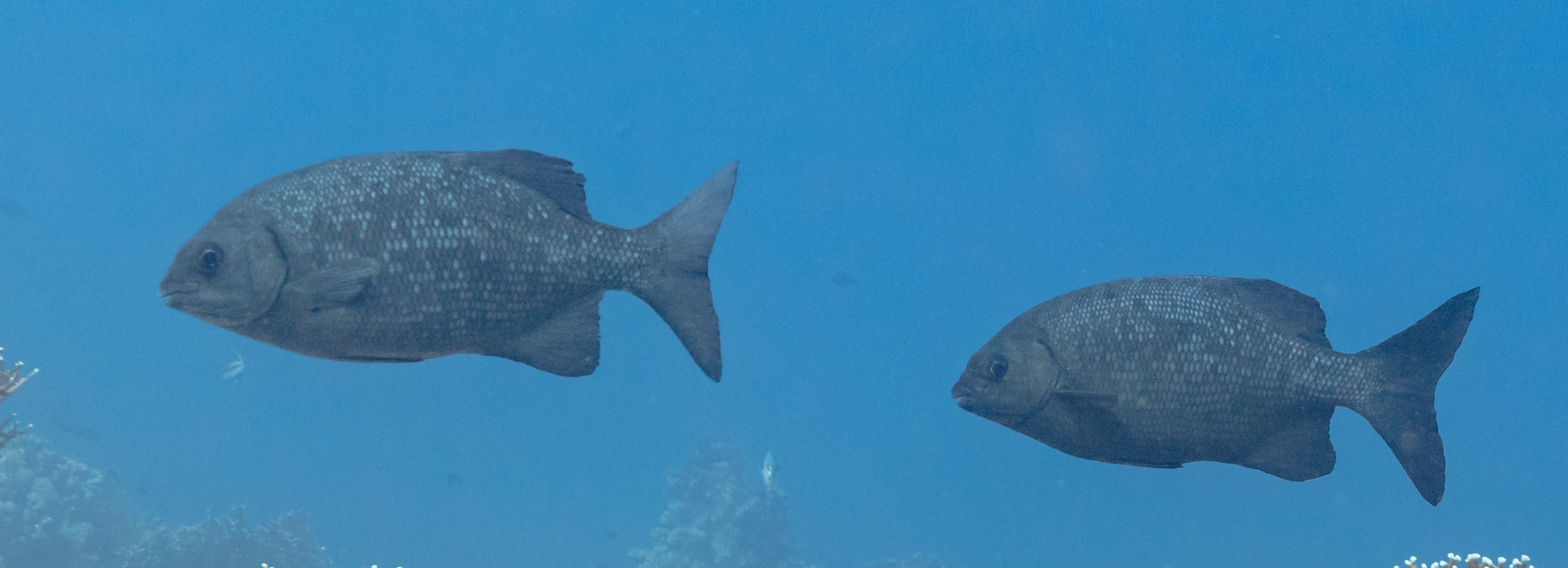
In the Red Sea

In Thailand

In the Maldives

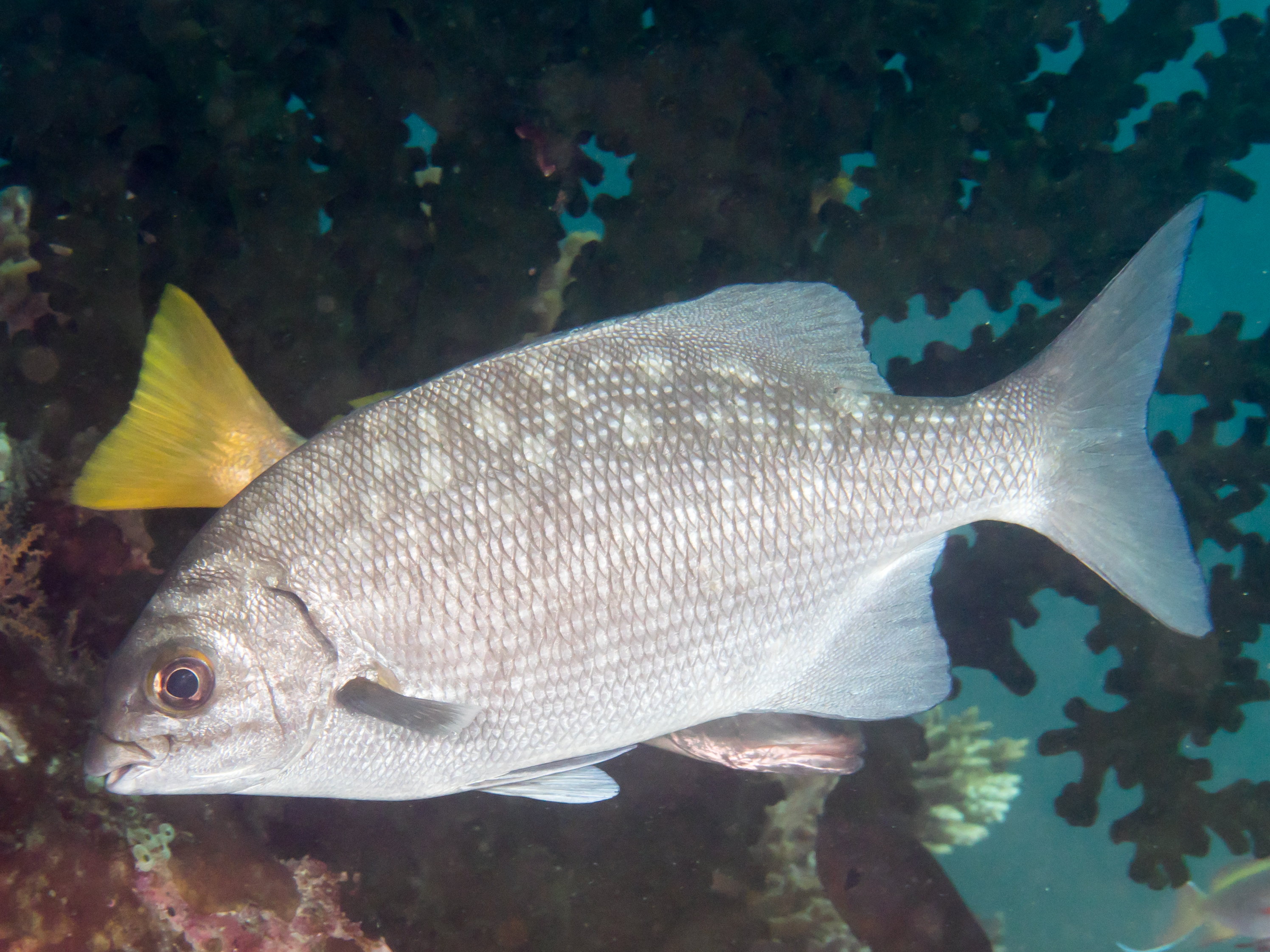
In Indonesia

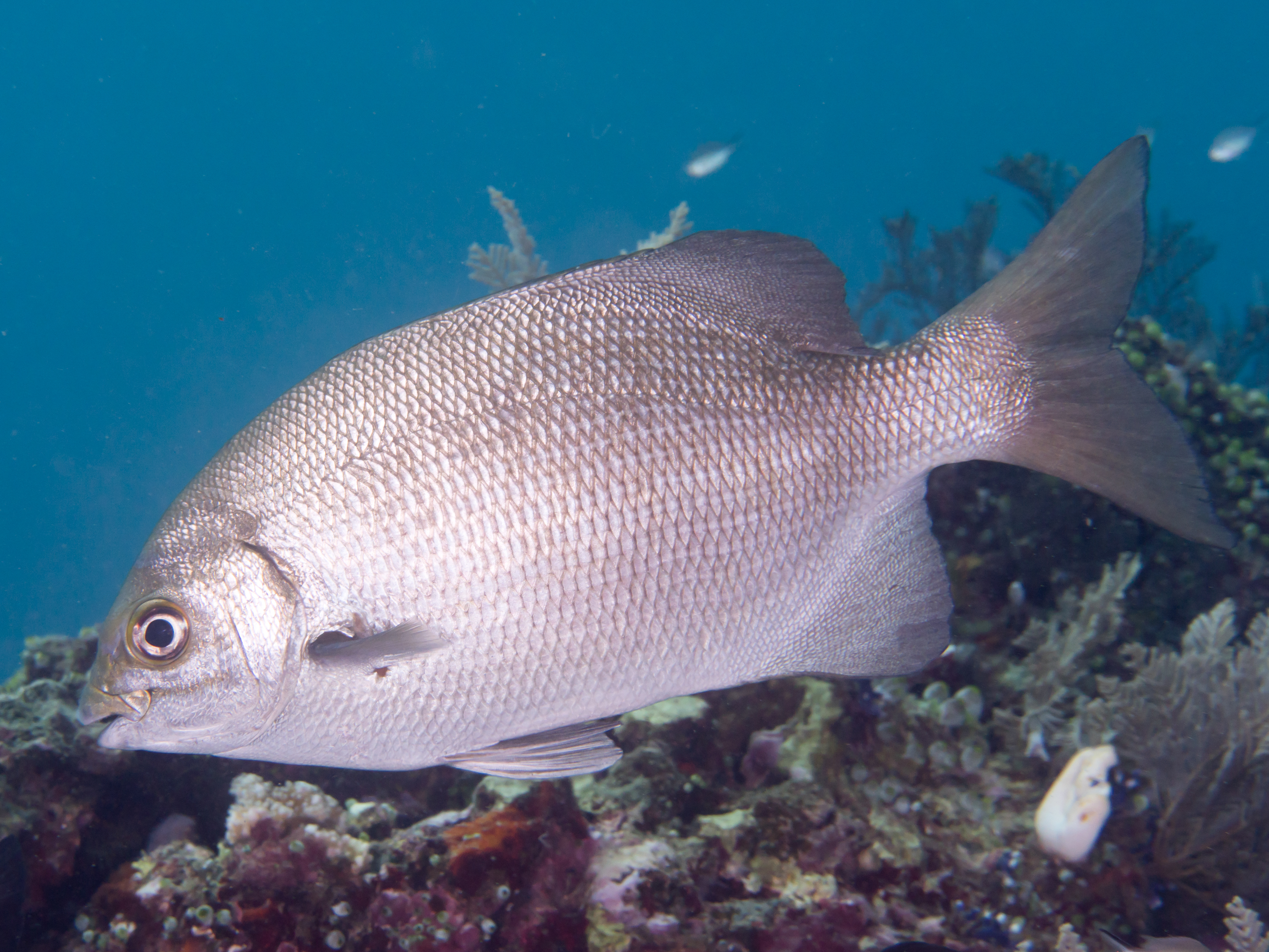
In Indonesia

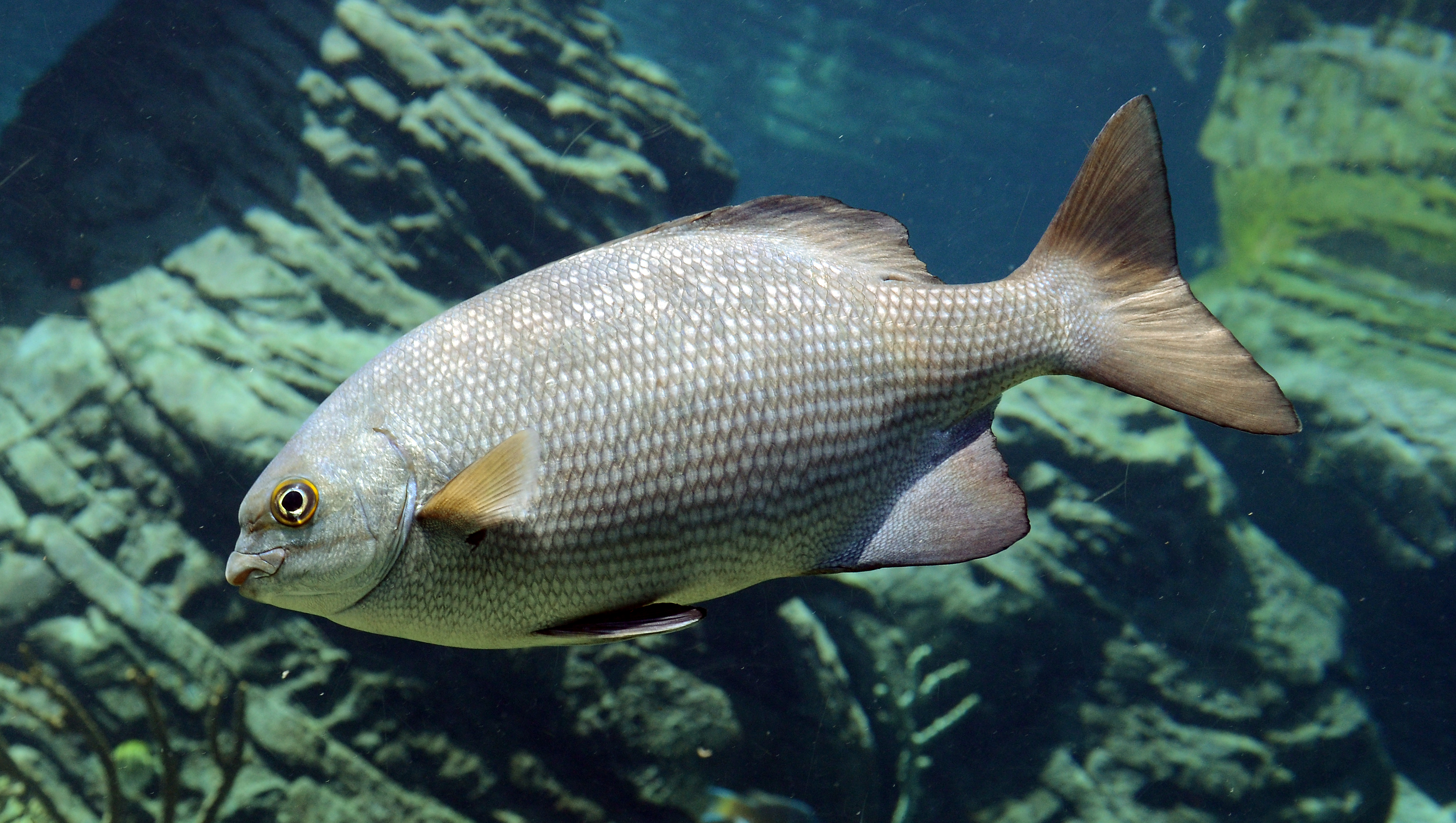
At UShaka Sea World
