= Girella tricuspidata =

- At North Island, New Zealand

Scientific classification
- Kingdom: Animalia
- Phylum: Chordata
- Class: Actinopterygii
- Division: Teleostei
- Order: Centrarchiformes
- Family: Girellidae
- Genus: Girella
- Species: G. tricuspidata

Binomial name
- Girella tricuspidata (Quoy & Gaimard, 1824)

Synonyms
- Doydixodon australis Thominot, 1881; Aplodon margaritiferum Thominot, 1883; Boops tricuspidatus Quoy & Gaimard, 1824

Species of fish

Girella tricuspidata is a species of marine ray-finned fish from the southeastern coast of Australia and around northern New Zealand. The main common names are luderick in Australia and parore (Māori: [ˈpa.ɾo.ɾe]) in New Zealand.

== Etymology ==
Girella tricuspidata is known by a number of vernacular names, the most common being blackfish, luderick and parore. Other names include black bream, mangrove fish, Pacific bream, rockperch and black snapper.

Historically, the racial slurs darkie (or darky) and nigger (or niggerfish) were used in Australia due to the fish's dark colour. The Fisheries Research and Development Corporation in Australia lists the terms "black bream", "blackfish", "darkie" and "nigger" as obsolete, and regards "luderick" as the standard common name.

== Taxonomy ==
Girella tricuspidata was first formally described as Boops tricuspidatus in 1824 by Jean René Constant Quoy & Joseph Paul Gaimard with the type locality given as "Shark Bay, Western Australia".

== Distribution ==
G. tricuspidata occurs off the coasts of eastern Australia and New Zealand. In Australia it occurs from Mackay, Queensland, to east of Adelaide in South Australia and off most of Tasmania. In New Zealand it occurs on both the east and west coasts of the North Island from the North Cape to the Cook Strait.

== Description ==
In New South Wales

In New South Wales

G. tricuspidata has been recorded growing up to a fork length of 71 centimetres (28 in), although total lengths around 35 centimetres (14 in) are more normal. The maximum published weight is 4 kilograms (8.8 lb). It has a moderately deep, compressed, oval-shaped body with a thin caudal peduncle, It has a small head which has a slightly convex forehead, and small eyes. The mouth is small and does not extend as far as the eye. The jaws have an outer row of overlapping, flattened, tricuspid teeth beside a wide band of teeth of similar shape but which are tiny. Much of the body is covered in moderately small ctenoid scales and there is an arched lateral line, made up of 48–51 pored scales, which is parallel to the dorsal profile. It has a continuous dorsal fin which has no demarcation between its spiny and rayed parts. The spiny part has 14–16 spines and is one and a half times to almost twice as long as the soft rayed part which contains 11–12 soft rays. The spines in the middle of the dorsal fin are the longest and are just a little bit shorter than the soft rays, which get shorter towards the tail. The anal fin is similar to the soft-rayed part of the dorsal fin, contains 3 spines and 11–12 soft rays and is situated opposite it. The caudal fin has 17 rays, is very large and broadly forked. The pectoral fins are small, with 16 rays the uppermost being the longest, and the pelvic fins are small, containing a spine and 5 rays.

The colour and pattern of G. tricuspidata is dark greenish-grey dorsally and silvery grey on the flanks and ventrally and belly. There are around 11 thin dark vertical bars underneath the dorsal finwhich fade ventrally. The head and pectoral fins are sometimes yellowish in colour but the fins are usually the same colour as the part of the body they are nearest to.

== Habitat and biology ==
Feeding on a blade of seagrass

G. tricuspidata is found in shallow coastal and estuarine waters where they frequently congregate in large schools in the vicinity of rocky outcrops and jetties. The small juveniles use seagrass beds to hide from predators. The species use their small sharp, incisor-like teeth for grazing on seaweed and algae such as Enteromorpha intestinalis, Ulva lactuca, Ulva intestinalis and sea cabbage, and use a band of crushing teeth which are used to grind algae. While primarily consuming algae, the species is an opportunistic omnivore, feeding on other food items like small crustaceans, pipi, mussels and beach worms. As G. tricuspidata matures, they congregate in large shoals and the adults form 'runs' from estuarine waters and coastal lakes into the sea. The fish spawn in the surf zone and mouths of estuaries, spawning takes place in the winter.

The species schools during the daytime, and at night hides in sheltered areas, camouflaging themselves by turning a brown colour.

== In a human context ==
Parore were a food for Māori people historically, especially in the north of New Zealand. They were caught using reef nets, set nets and nets that dredged the floors of sandy harbours. During the colonial period of New Zealand, the fish developed a bad reputation among European New Zealanders, with them believing it to have a terrible taste. The fish was detested by fishermen, as the fish's spines would tangle and tear nets. The taste of the flesh varies widely, with fish caught from ocean reefs having a clean, fresh taste, while those from rivers and harbours taste muddy and weedy. The better fish taste not dissimilar to snapper, and retailers sell it under the name "black snapper".

While historically disliked in New Zealand, luderick is a very popular fish in Eastern Australia, being one of the most important commercial fish at different points of the 20th century. In modern times, luderick are fished for commercially in New South Wales and in New Zealand they are landed as a bycatch in the grey mullet fishery. The fish are sold fresh. They are a popular quarry for recreational fisheries in Australia and can be caught of seaweed under a float or artificial weed fly, less so in New Zealand where they appear to be mainly caught by recreational fishermen targeting other species.
