= Girella cyanea =

- At Norfolk Island

Scientific classification
- Kingdom: Animalia
- Phylum: Chordata
- Class: Actinopterygii
- Division: Teleostei
- Order: Centrarchiformes
- Family: Girellidae
- Genus: Girella
- Species: G. cyanea

Binomial name
- Girella cyanea W. J. Macleay, 1881

Species of fish

Girella cyanea, also known as the blue drummer or Australian bluefish, is a species of marine fish from the inshore waters of Australia to New Zealand and the Kermadec Islands.

== History ==
Sightings were first recorded in 1881 but the species made its debut in scientific publications in 1919 in Theodore Roughly's Fishes of Australia and Their Technology.

== Distribution and habitat ==
Girella cyanea are commonly found in the south-west Pacific Ocean; occurring along the east coast of Australia from Flinders Reef off Cape Moreton in Queensland to Eden in southern New South Wales. The species can also be found at Elizabeth and Middleton Reefs, Lord Howe and Norfolk Islands, and New Zealand's North and Kermadec Islands. Bluefish are ocean dwellers and do not generally enter rivers or estuaries.

Juveniles are known to live in tidal pools until they reach adulthood and form schools over reef areas. Adults can typically be found in coastal and offshore rocky reef areas in New South Wales at depths ranging from 5–30 metres (16–98 ft).

== Description ==
At Norfolk Island

Girella cyanea can be recognized by its blue coloration and yellow spots, with its blueish color becoming a greyish-green in post mortem. The adults of this species are they can attain a length of 76 cm and their bright flank spots are distinctive. When they are younger they are greeny-grey in colour and the spots are paler yellow. These fish have a small beak-like mouth and they have large scales.

== Ecology ==
Schooling, at Norfolk Island

Girella cyanea are omnivorous; they are known to eat crustaceans, smaller fishes, mollusks; along with calcareous seaweeds, brittle stars, cunjevoi, and marine worms. They are known to feed at dawn and dusk when they are most active.

An ontogenetic diet was found in fish less than 40 millimetres (1.6 in) standard length. Those found in intertidal habitat having a mainly carnivorous diet and a digestive system without developed pyloric caeca. In contrast, pyloric caeca were well-developed in fish larger than 40 millimetres (1.6 in) and their diets possessed increased ingestion of algae.

== Reproduction ==
Girella cyanea is a fast-growing and long-lived fish, with the oldest observed specimen being 41 years old. It is believed they transition into sexual maturity between 2 and 5 years of age or when they reach 200 millimetres (7.9 in) in length.

== Conservation ==
A fishing closure was placed across the state of New South Wales in 2006 due to the lack of sightings at the coast; despite the lack of official endangered species status. However, recreational fishing is still permitted on Lord Howe Island. A bag limit of 5 fish per person per day is enforced in protection zones across the Marine Park.

Taking or possessing bluefish from New South Wales waters, other than designated areas, is an offense that carries a multitude of penalties. Penalties for taking bluefish in contravention of the fishing closure can include fines of up to $110,000 for corporations while individuals can face fines of up to $22,000 along with up to 6 months in prison, or both. Penalties for possessing a Blue Drummer despite the fishing closure can include fines of up to $55,000 for corporations, while individuals can face fines of up to $11,000 and up to 3 months in prison, or both.
