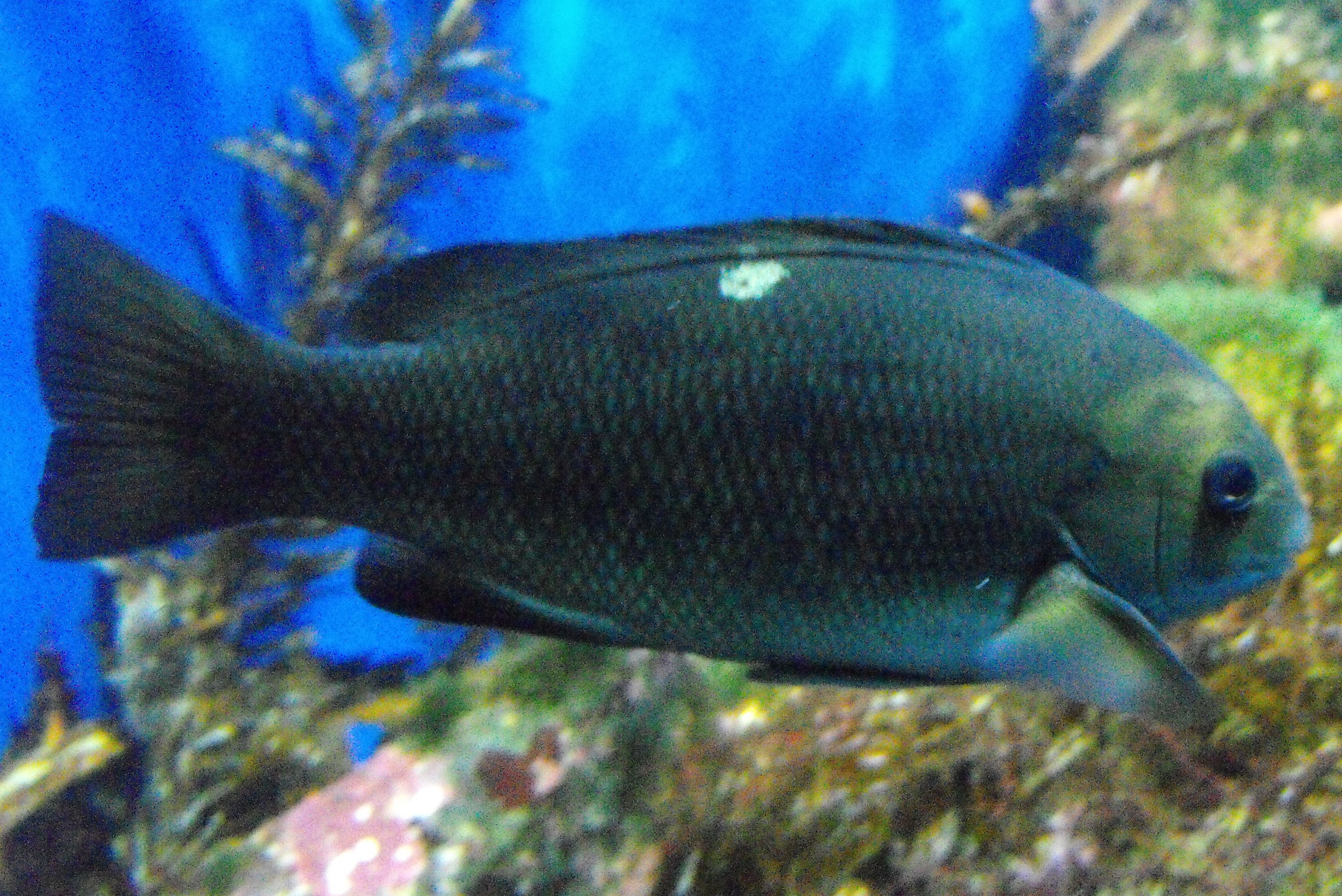
- At the Birch Aquarium, in California

Conservation status
- Least Concern (IUCN 3.1)

Scientific classification
- Kingdom: Animalia
- Phylum: Chordata
- Class: Actinopterygii
- Division: Teleostei
- Order: Centrarchiformes
- Family: Girellidae
- Genus: Girella
- Species: G. nigricans

Binomial name
- Girella nigricans (Ayres, 1860)

Synonyms
- Camarina nigricans Ayres, 1860

= Girella nigricans =

Species of fish

Girella nigricans, commonly known as the opaleye or rudderfish, is a species of sea chub found in the Eastern Pacific, from California to southern Baja California. A rarely documented isolated population also exists in the Gulf of California, which might be genetically different from the rest of the species. They are commonly found in shallow waters and intertidal zones, usually over rocks and kelp beds, at depths of 1 to 32 m (3.3 to 105.0 ft). They feed primarily on algae, but will occasionally consume sessile invertebrates (including crustaceans, worms, and molluscs). They are considered commercially important game fish.

== Distribution ==
Opaleye are endemic to the Eastern Pacific Ocean, and their geographic range spans from San Francisco, California to Baja California, Mexico. They are most abundant south of Point Conception. Opaleye spend their adult lives in kelp beds of the rocky subtidal zone, while juveniles inhabit the intertidal zone, often in tidepools.

Adult opaleye are most abundant at depths of 20 feet. They are found in kelp forests, where they are abundant, and contribute greatly to the health and productivity of kelp forest ecosystems. Because there are few herbivorous fish species in the temperate waters of southern California, opaleye along with another fish species, halfmoon, are important for maintaining kelp forest communities. They maintain the balance of algae in kelp forests, preventing the kelp from taking over, by grazing on it. This is important for the health of the kelp forest community as it allows other species of algae and sessile invertebrates to compete for space. Opaleye also increase nutrient input through their excretions.

== Description ==
With two spots, in California

Girella nigricans has been recorded growing up to 66 cm (26 in) in length and 13.5 pounds. The body of is laterally compressed and oval in shape. The snout is blunt and short, with a thick-lipped small mouth located at the front. The species is dentally polymorphic, with some juveniles transitioning from tricuspid teeth to simple teeth. The fins are all relatively short and rounded to blunt in shape. The dorsal fin is continuous and the tail fin has a straight margin. The dorsal fin of opaleye consists of soft rays and spines, in which the dorsal soft rays are longer or about equal to the dorsal spines. The dorsal fin has 12 to 14 spines (anterior) and 12 to 15 soft rays (posterior). The anal fin has three spines and 10 to 13 soft rays. The paired fins, which are the pectoral and pelvic fins, are relatively short.

Adults are grey-green to olive green in color in life, with two to six lighter colored spots on the middle of the upper back. They usually have just one pair of white spots beneath the center of their dorsal fin, but they can have more spots on each side. Opaleye with more than two spots are not uncommon, and this feature may be the product of gene flow with the related gulf opaleye (Girella simplicidens), which have six spots. A white bar may be present between the eyes. The eyes are opalescent blue-green in color. Juveniles are bluish in color on the dorsal surface and silvery on the ventral surface.

== Biology ==
In California

In California

Adult opaleye have three to four rows of teeth and undergo rapid tooth replacement.

The jaws and teeth of opaleye have become adapted to their feeding habits, allowing them to efficiently graze on algae. Their tooth structure includes a hinge joint, which facilitates the scraping of algae off of rocks. The top of each tooth has a tricuspid scraping blade, which is bent at a right angle to the bottom of the tooth. Because the teeth are hinged, individual teeth or groups of teeth are able to scrape closely over uneven rock surfaces.

Opaleye are eurythermal fish, meaning that they can tolerate a large range of temperatures. Adult opaleye live in waters where surface temperatures range from about 10 to 26 degrees Celsius. Because young opaleye live in tidepools where there is less inflow of water from the subtidal area, they occupy higher water temperatures than older opaleye. Juveniles tend to be found in waters with an average temperature of around 26 degrees Celsius.

Opaleye exhibit homing behavior, meaning that they continuously return to a specific tidepool or area. Homing behavior is predominantly seen in juvenile opaleye, as they spend the first part of their lives living in tidepools where they can leave and return to one specific pool. This behavior decreases as the fish grow older, because they eventually leave the intertidal area for the subtidal zone.

Pre-juvenile opaleye have been known to sometimes aggregate under floating objects like masses of kelp and jellyfish, both offshore (before reaching the intertidal zone) and in tidepools.

=== Diet ===
Opaleye are omnivorous fish, however the majority of their diet is herbivorous. Primarily, they feed on red and green algae and seagrasses. They do feed on kelp as well, but less often than other types of algae. Small organisms that live on the algae they eat are also incorporated into their diet. Although the proportion of their diet that consists of animals is very small, they do sometimes feed on crustaceans, hydroids, and other small animals. Their feeding habits depend on factors such as habitat, water temperature, and digestive system morphology. In warmer water temperatures, opaleye tend to be more herbivorous, feeding on a higher amount of algae than they do in colder water. Also, opaleye that are more herbivorous usually have longer guts allowing them to digest plant material more easily. Predators of opaleye include seabirds such as cormorants, terns, and bald eagles, as well as larger fish species, seals, and sea lions.

Some juvenile opaleye individuals have shown cleaning behavior, where they remove scales or ectoparasites from other fish species. However, this behavior is not done habitually.

=== Reproduction ===
Opaleye are pelagic spawners, where the eggs and larvae are released into open water and are free floating. This spawning occurs in April, May, and June. As juveniles, they migrate closer to the shore in small schools of around two dozen or less, usually moving into tidepools. For most young opaleye this happens around late June when the fish are about two months old, and around one inch long. They stay in the intertidal zone for anywhere between one year to two or more years. Living in tidepools allows the juveniles to grow and develop without the presence of large predators that do not inhabit this area. Eventually, they make their way back to deeper waters, where they mature and spawn, usually around age two or three. They typically spawn in kelp beds.

After living in the intertidal zone for a short time, the young opaleye undergo both morphological and behavioral changes, usually within a week. They change color, from silver (on the ventral and lateral surfaces) and bluish (on the dorsal surface) to olive green, and they gain white spots beneath the dorsal fin on either side. Additionally, they stop schooling and begin to spend time in areas where they can quickly hide under rocks in order to protect themselves from predators. They also shift from being plankton feeders towards a more herbivorous, algae-based diet.

Opaleye can live up to ten years of age, with their fastest growth rates occurring between ages zero and four, which is before they reach sexual maturity. After this, their growth slows significantly, due to a redirection of energy into reproduction. Sagittal otoliths, which are structures found in the inner ear of fish, are used to estimate age in opaleye. Weight of the otoliths is also used to estimate age.

== Conservation ==
On the IUCN Red List, opaleye are listed as least concern. Their populations are stable with no indication of population decline. There are no major threats to opaleye populations. The geographic range of opaleye does include multiple Marine Protected Areas, although the species itself does not have any conservation measures. There is a rare population in the Gulf of California for which there is concern. In fisheries, opaleye are caught mainly for recreational purposes, however they are caught incidentally in commercial fisheries as well. They are sometimes sold in live fish markets. Mainly they are caught using hook and line, and sometimes by spear. Because they are typically incidental catch and are abundant, fisheries do not have a negative impact on their populations.
