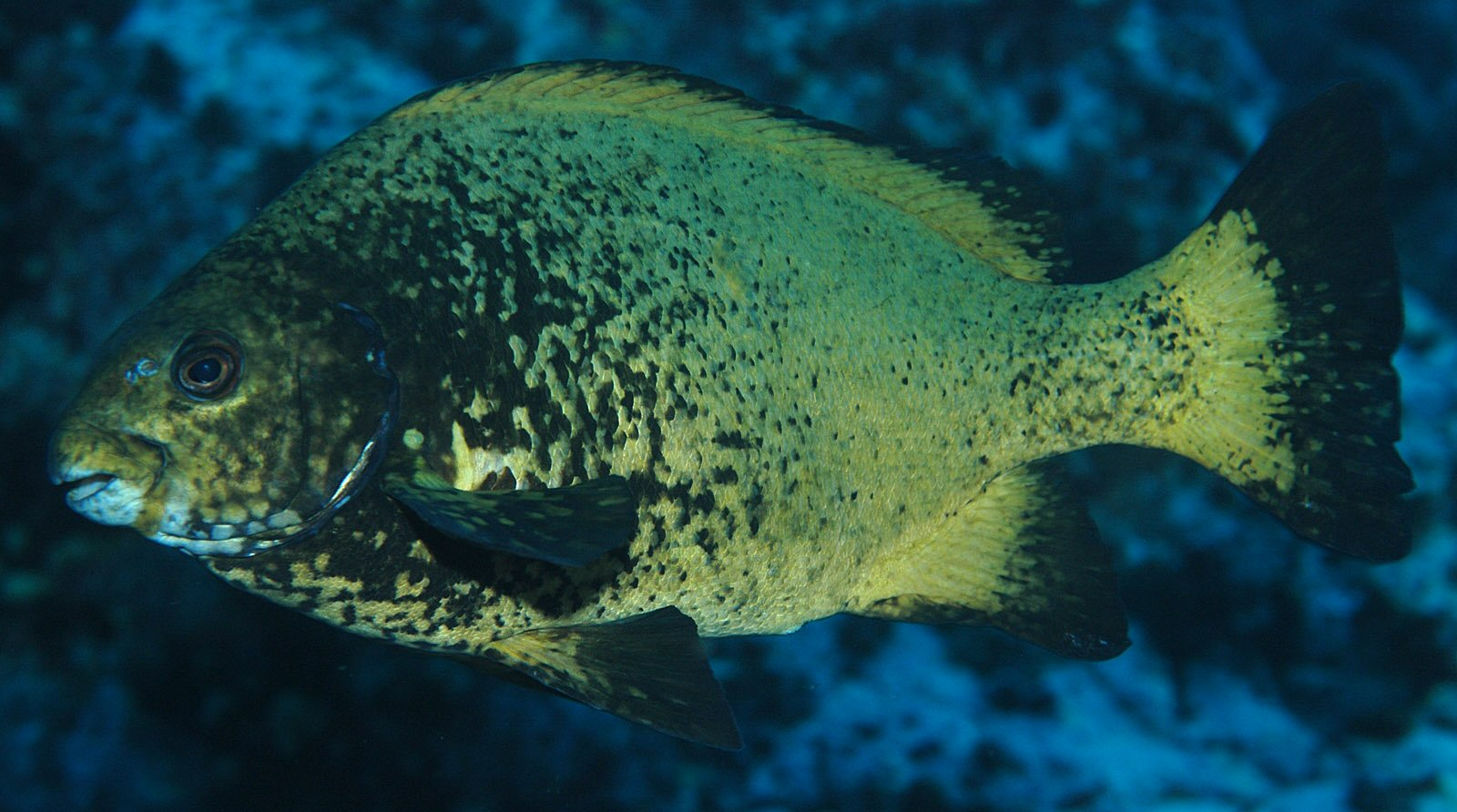
- Girella fimbriata

Scientific classification
- Domain: Eukaryota
- Kingdom: Animalia
- Phylum: Chordata
- Class: Actinopterygii
- Order: Centrarchiformes
- Suborder: Terapontoidei
- Family: Girellidae; Gill, 1862

Genera
- 2, see text

= Girellidae =

Family of ray-finned fishes

Girellidae is a family of ray-finned fish in the order Centrarchiformes. They may be referred to as nibblers.

== Species ==
The species in two genera are:

- Genus Girella
  - Girella albostriata (Steindachner, 1898)
  - Girella cyanea (Macleay, 1881) - New Zealand bluefish, blue drummer
  - Girella elevata (Macleay, 1881) - black drummer
  - Girella feliciana (Clark, 1938)
  - Girella fimbriata (McCulloch, 1920) - caramel drummer
  - Girella freminvillii (Valenciennes, 1846)
  - Girella laevifrons (Tschudi, 1846)
  - Girella leonina (Richardson, 1846)
  - Girella mezina (Jordan & Starks, 1907)
  - Girella nebulosa (Kendall & Radcliffe, 1912) - Rapa Nui nibbler
  - Girella nigricans (Ayres, 1860) - opaleye
  - Girella punctata (Gray, 1835) - largescale blackfish
  - Girella simplicidens (Osburn & Nichols, 1916) - gulf opaleye
  - Girella stuebeli (Troschel, 1866)
  - Girella tephraeops (Richardson, 1846) - rock blackfish
  - Girella tricuspidata (Quoy & Gaimard, 1824) - parore
  - Girella zebra (Richardson, 1846) - zebra fish, stripey bream
  - Girella zonata (Günther, 1859)
- Genus Graus
  - Graus nigra (Philippi, 1887)
