= Kyphosus =

- Kyphosus bigibbus

Scientific classification
- Kingdom: Animalia
- Phylum: Chordata
- Class: Actinopterygii
- Division: Teleostei
- Order: Centrarchiformes
- Family: Kyphosidae
- Genus: Kyphosus; Lacépède, 1801

Type species
- Kyphosus bigibbus Lacépède, 1801

Synonyms
- List: Cridorsa Whitley, 1938; Dorsuarius Lacepède, 1803; Hermosilla Jenkins & Evermann, 1889; Leptokyphosus Whitley, 1931; Opisthistius Gill, 1862; Pimelepterus Lacepède, 1802; Sectator Jordan & Fesler, 1893; Segutilum Whitley, 1931; Seleima Bowdich, 1825; Xyster Lacepède, 1803

Genus of ray-finned fishes

Kyphosus is a genus of sea chubs native to the Atlantic, Indian and Pacific oceans.

== Species ==
Catalog of Fishes recognises the following 12 species:

| Species | Common name | Image |
|---|---|---|
| Kyphosus azureus (O. P. Jenkins & Evermann, 1889) | Zebra-perch sea chub | |
| Kyphosus bigibbus Lacépède, 1801 | Brown chub | |
| Kyphosus cinerascens (Forsskål, 1775) | Highfin chub | |
| Kyphosus cornelii (Whitley, 1944) | Western buffalo bream | |
| Kyphosus elegans (W. K. H. Peters, 1869) | Cortez sea chub | |
| Kyphosus gladius Knudsen & Clements, 2013 | Gladius sea chub | |
| Kyphosus hawaiiensis K. Sakai & Nakabo, 2004 | Hawaiian chub | |
| Kyphosus ocyurus (D. S. Jordan & C. H. Gilbert, 1882) | Blue-striped chub | |
| Kyphosus sectatrix (Linnaeus, 1766) | Bermuda chub | |
| Kyphosus sydneyanus (Günther, 1886) | Silver drummer | |
| Kyphosus vaigiensis (Quoy & Gaimard, 1825) | Brassy chub | |
