= Kyphosus bigibbus =

- In Western Australia

Conservation status
- Least Concern (IUCN 3.1)

Scientific classification
- Kingdom: Animalia
- Phylum: Chordata
- Class: Actinopterygii
- Division: Teleostei
- Order: Centrarchiformes
- Family: Kyphosidae
- Genus: Kyphosus
- Species: K. bigibbus

Binomial name
- Kyphosus bigibbus Lacépède, 1801

Synonyms
- List: Pimelepterus bosquii Lacepède, 1802; Kyphosus bosquii (Lacepède, 1802); Xyster fuscus Lacepède, 1803; Kyphosus fuscus (Lacepède, 1803); Pimelepterus fuscus (Lacepède, 1803); Dorsuarius nigrescens Lacepède, 1803; Pimelepterus fallax Klunzinger, 1884

Species of fish

Kyphosus bigibbus, the brown chub, grey drummer, darkfin drummer, insular rudderfish, grey chub, grey sea chub, southern drummer or topsail drummer is a species of marine ray-finned fish, a sea chub from the family Kyphosidae. It is a herbivorous species which is found in subtropical and tropical seas worldwide.

== Taxonomy ==
Kyphosus bigibbus was first formally described by Bernard Germain de Lacépède in 1801 in volume 3 of Histoire naturelle des poissons, Lacépède did not give a type locality but it is stated elsewhere as Fort Dauphin in Madagascar.

== Distribution ==
Kyphosus bigibbus has a wide distribution in the Indian, Pacific and Atlantic Oceans. In the Indo-Pacific it has been recorded off Western Australia as far south as Rottnest Island, in eastern Australia it is found from southern Queensland and New South Wales as far south as Montague Island, it occurs off northeastern New Zealand. It is also found in the Coral Sea off New Caledonia, Lord Howe Island, Norfolk Island and the Kermadec Islands. In the Indian Ocean it is thought to probably range widely along the northern coasts from Myanmar to Yemen. In the western Indian Ocean it occurs as far north is the Red Sea and from the Gulf of Aden off Somalia south to Madagascar, Réunion. Its range then extends around the Cape of Good Hope. It has not been confirmed to be present in the Persian Gulf. In the western pacific it is found off southern Japan, Korea, and China as far south as Taiwan, but it is absent from equatorial areas. In the western Atlantic it has been observed off Bermuda, Grand Cayman Island, Belize, and San Blas, Panama. In the eastern Atlantic it has been recorded from Saint Helena, Madeira, Ascension Island, and probably occurs around the Gulf of Guinea Islands and along the west African coast to South Africa. It is also found along Atlantic coast of northwestern Africa as far north as Portugal, but it has not been recorded from the Mediterranean. It has been recorded from Brazil.

== Description ==
At Norfolk Island

Kyphosus bigibbus has an oval shaped body which is laterally compressed with a small head, a pointed snout and a slightly bulging forehead. The mouth is small and when closed the maxilla are hidden beneath the preorbital bones. The mouth is terminal and is almost oblique. The teeth are fixed and incisiform with their bases positioned horizontally in mouth, they have rounded crowns and have a curved, J shape. There are teeth are found on the centre of the roof of the mouth and on the tongue. The dorsal fin is a similar height along its length The anterior part of the dorsal fin has 11 spines which fold down into a scaled furrow while the posterior part contains 10-12 rays. The anal fin has three spines and 10-12 moderately long soft rays and is reasonably long at its base. The symmetrical caudal fin is forked but not extremely so. The lateral line has 61-76 scales of which 51-60 are pored. The colour varies from uniform grey to brownish, silvery ventrally, bronze to greenish tint dorsally. There are very indistinct dark stripes on the body and there are usually whitish streaks on the cheek. The dorsal and anal fins are frequently dark with black margins on their soft-rayed parts. There is sometimes a dark patch visible on the lower posterior angle of the base of the pectoral fin. The caudal fin is usually dark. There are infrequent records of completely yellow individuals and very rate records of albinos. The maximum total length of this species is 75 centimetres (30 in) and it has been weighed at 1.9 kilograms (4.2 lb).

== Habitat and biology ==
Kyphosus bigibbus is found in shallow coral and rocky reefs, including exposed isolated, offshore reefs and around islands. They are frequently recorded in the surge zone, down to depths of 20 metres (66 ft). They are often recorded in mixed schools with other related species. The juveniles often hide among flotsam and can disperse for long distances among this floating material. It is a herbivore which feeds mainly on algae of the genera Sargassum and Turbinaria.

== Fisheries ==
Kyphosus bigibbus is not targeted by fisheries over much of its distribution but where it is a fisheries quarry it is valued as a foodfish.
