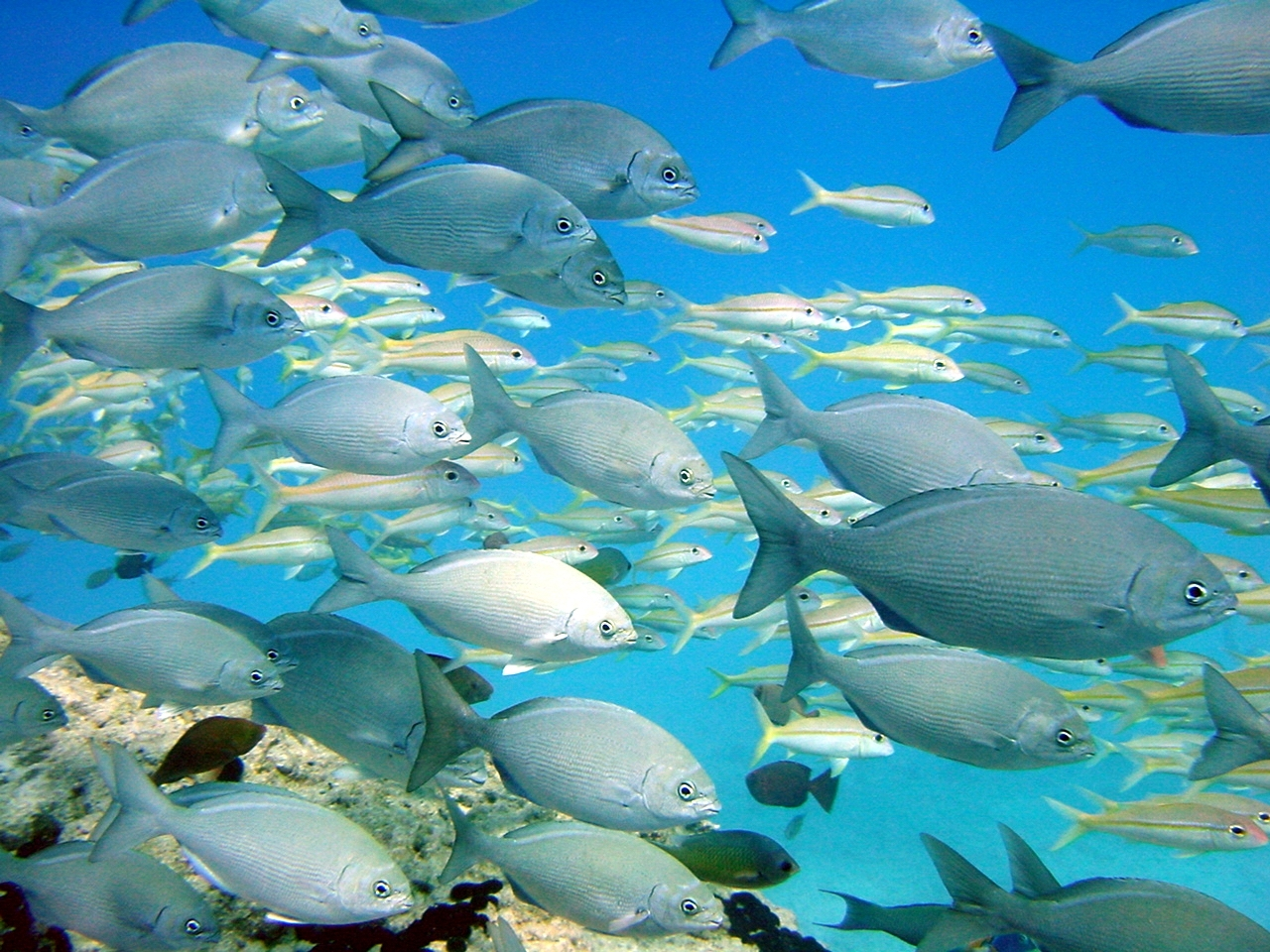
- Kyphosus bigibbus

Scientific classification
- Kingdom: Animalia
- Phylum: Chordata
- Class: Actinopterygii
- Division: Teleostei
- Order: Centrarchiformes
- Suborder: Terapontoidei
- Family: Kyphosidae; Jordan, 1887

Genera
- Kyphosus; Neoscorpis

= Sea chub =

Family of fishes

The sea chubs, also known as rudderfish and pilot fish and in Hawaiian as enenue or nenue, are a family, Kyphosidae, (from Greek, kyphos = hump) of fishes in the order Centrarchiformes native to the Atlantic, Indian and Pacific Oceans usually close to shore in marine waters.

== Genera ==
The following two genera are placed in this family:

- Kyphosidae Jordan, 1887 (rudderfishes)
  - Genus Kyphosus Lacépède, 1801
  - Genus Neoscorpis J. L. B. Smith, 1931

In the past, Girellidae, Scorpididae and Microcanthidae were treated as subfamilies within Kyphosidae. However, they are now treated as distinct families.
