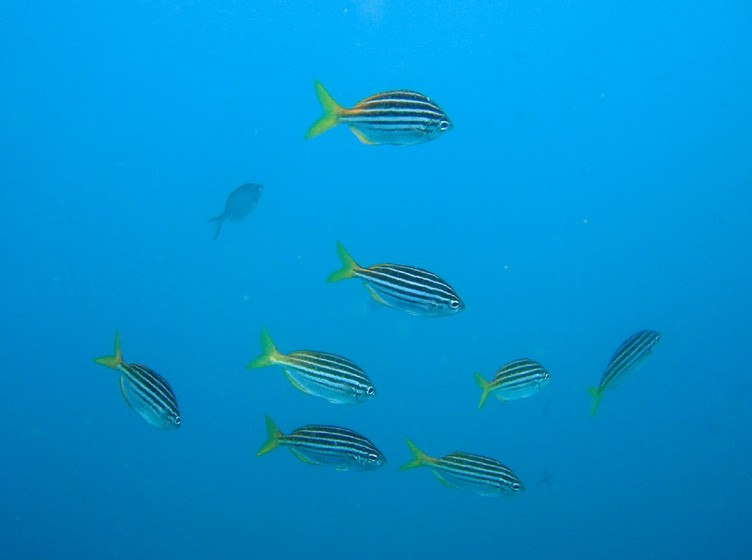

Scientific classification
- Domain: Eukaryota
- Kingdom: Animalia
- Phylum: Chordata
- Class: Actinopterygii
- Order: Centrarchiformes
- Family: Kyphosidae
- Genus: Atypichthys
- Species: A. strigatus

Binomial name
- Atypichthys strigatus (Günther, 1860)

Synonyms
- Atypus strigatus Günther, 1860

= Atypichthys strigatus =

Species of ray-finned fish

Atypichthys strigatus, commonly known as the mado, is a species of ray-finned fish in the family Microcanthidae. This fish is endemic to Eastern Australia.

== Description ==
This species grows to ~20 cm. It has a silver body with dark brown to black stripes, and yellow fins.

== Distribution ==
The mado is endemic to Australia.

== Behaviour ==
A. strigatus forms large schools.

== Habitat ==
A. strigatus are benthic coastal reef inhabitants and are commonly found on reef and under made structures such as wharfs, in depths of 0–55 m.

== Diet ==
A. strigatus are omnivorous. The A. strigatus primarily feed on zooplankton.
