= Silver sweep =

- In New Zealand

Scientific classification
- Kingdom: Animalia
- Phylum: Chordata
- Class: Actinopterygii
- Division: Teleostei
- Order: Centrarchiformes
- Family: Scorpididae
- Genus: Scorpis
- Species: S. lineolata

Binomial name
- Scorpis lineolata Kner, 1865

Species of fish

The silver sweep (Scorpis lineolata), also known as the false pompano, sweep, trumps or windawindawi, is a species of marine ray-finned fish from the subfamily Scorpidinae of the sea chub family Kyphosidae. It is native to the southwestern Pacific Ocean from Australia to New Zealand.

== Taxonomy ==
The silver sweep was first formally described by the Austrian ichthyologist Rudolf Kner in 1865 with the type locality given as Sydney in New South Wales.

== Distribution ==
The silver sweep is found in the southwestern Pacific Ocean off Australia and New Zealand.

In Australia it is found from Moreton Bay in Queensland south to Tasmania and west as far as Victor Harbor, South Australia. It is also found in the Tasman Sea around Lord Howe Island and Norfolk Island. Silver sweep are a common fish on the east coast of Australia, particularly in New South Wales. In New Zealand silver sweep are distributed around the coast of the North Island, however vagrants have been recorded as far south as Dunedin

== Description ==
Juvenile, in New Zealand

The silver sweep has deep and strongly compressed body with a thin caudal peduncle. The head is moderately sized with an almost straight dorsal profile, a short snout and quite large eyes. The mouth is small and oblique with small but strong teeth in the jaws arranged in broad bands with the outer band being enlarged and recurved. Most of the body is covered in very small ctenoid scales and there is a gently curved lateral line. The dorsal fin continuous with a very short first spine, there are a 10 spines which progressively become higher towards the tail, the first rays in the soft-rayed portion of the dorsal fin is only slightly higher than the spiny portion giving the dorsal fin an almost straight profile. The soft-rayed part of the dorsal fin contains 26-28 soft rays. The anal fin has 3 spines and 27-28 soft rays. The soft portion of the dorsal fin is notably longer than they spiny portion. It has small pectoral fin are small with the uppermost rays being the longest. The pelvic fins are also small and are located below and to the rear of the pectoral fins.

In New Zealand

In New Zealand

Silver sweeps are greyish, blue-grey or green-grey dorsally and silver-grey ventrally, with the edge of the gill cover and the base of the pectoral fin being blackish. This species can reach a length of 30 cm (12 in).

== Habitat and biology ==
Schooling, in New Zealand

Adult silver sweeps are found on coastal reefs at depths down to at least 50 metres (160 ft), It feeds on plankton over rock reefs where it forms schools while juveniles settle in tide pools and can be found in the brackish waters of estuaries. They spawn in the winter with the peak breeding season between May and August. The eggs are pelagic. The young fish grow very quickly for the first 2–3 years but growth slows down significantly after sexual maturity, although they may live over 50 years. Silver sweeps have separate sexes.

== Fisheries ==
The silver sweep is of secondary importance as a target for commercial fisheries and is caught using purse seines and trap nets. Since 1997-98 the amount landed in New South Wales has declined from nearly 15t to less than 50t. About 60t are caught annually in New South Wales by recreational fishermen. The flesh of the silver sweep is said to be firm and of excellent quality.
