= Stripey =

- In Japan

Conservation status
- Least Concern (IUCN 3.1)

Scientific classification
- Kingdom: Animalia
- Phylum: Chordata
- Class: Actinopterygii
- Division: Teleostei
- Order: Centrarchiformes
- Suborder: Terapontoidei
- Family: Microcanthidae
- Genus: Microcanthus
- Species: M. strigatus

Binomial name
- Microcanthus strigatus (G. Cuvier, 1831)

Synonyms
- List: Genus: Neochaetodon Castelnau, 1873; Therapaina Kaup, 1860 Species: Chaetodon strigatus G. Cuvier, 1831; Micrognathus strigatus (G. Cuvier, 1831); Neochaetodon vittatum Castelnau, 1873

Species of fish

The stripey (Microcanthus strigatus), also known as the footballer or convict fish, is a species of ray-finned fish, a sea chub from the subfamily Microcanthinae which is part of the family Kyphosidae. It is native to the Pacific Ocean where it has a wide range. This species may be found in the aquarium trade.

== Taxonomy ==
The stripey was first formally described as Chaetodon strigatus in 1831 by the French zoologist Georges Cuvier with the type locality given as Nagasaki. It was previously regarded as the only species in the genus Microcanthus, but as of 2020, a second species has been recognized.

M. strigatus is formed by an east Asian clade and a western Australian clade.

== Distribution ==
In Western Australia

The stripey is found in the Pacific Ocean where it has a disjunct distribution with a northern and a southern population. The northern population is found from Japan and Taiwan to Hawaii and the southern population is found along the east and west coasts of Australia, around Lord Howe Island and off New Caledonia. The Australian distribution runs from central Queensland to southern New South Wales, although it may extend as far as eastern Victoria and the north east of Tasmania, and from Cape Leeuwin to the Exmouth Gulf in Western Australia.

== Description ==
The stripey has a deep, compressed body which has a rounded back, it has a distinctive pattern of oblique black and yellow, sometimes white, stripes. The stripes extend onto the dorsal and anal fins, and there is a black stripe which runs from the forehead to just to the rear of the eye. The maximum total length is 16 centimetres (6.3 in).

== Habitat and biology ==
Schooling, in Western Australia

The stripey occurs in coastal and lagoon reefs where during the day it forms dense schools which hide under ledges and in caves. It feeds on small crustaceans and algae. Juvenile stripets are often seen in tidal pools while the adults may be seen around man-made structures such as jetties and harbour walls. They may enter brackish water.

== Aquarium ==
The stripey is occasionally found in the aquarium trade.
