= Bathystethus orientale =

Scientific classification
- Kingdom: Animalia
- Phylum: Chordata
- Class: Actinopterygii
- Order: Centrarchiformes
- Family: Scorpididae
- Genus: Bathystethus
- Species: B. orientale

Binomial name
- Bathystethus orientale Regan 1913

Species of ray-finned fish

Bathystethus orientale, the silver knifefish, is a species of ray-finned fish native to the eastern Pacific Ocean around Easter Island. First discovered in 1913, this fish is found near the surface along exposed steep rocky shores and feeds on zooplankton.
