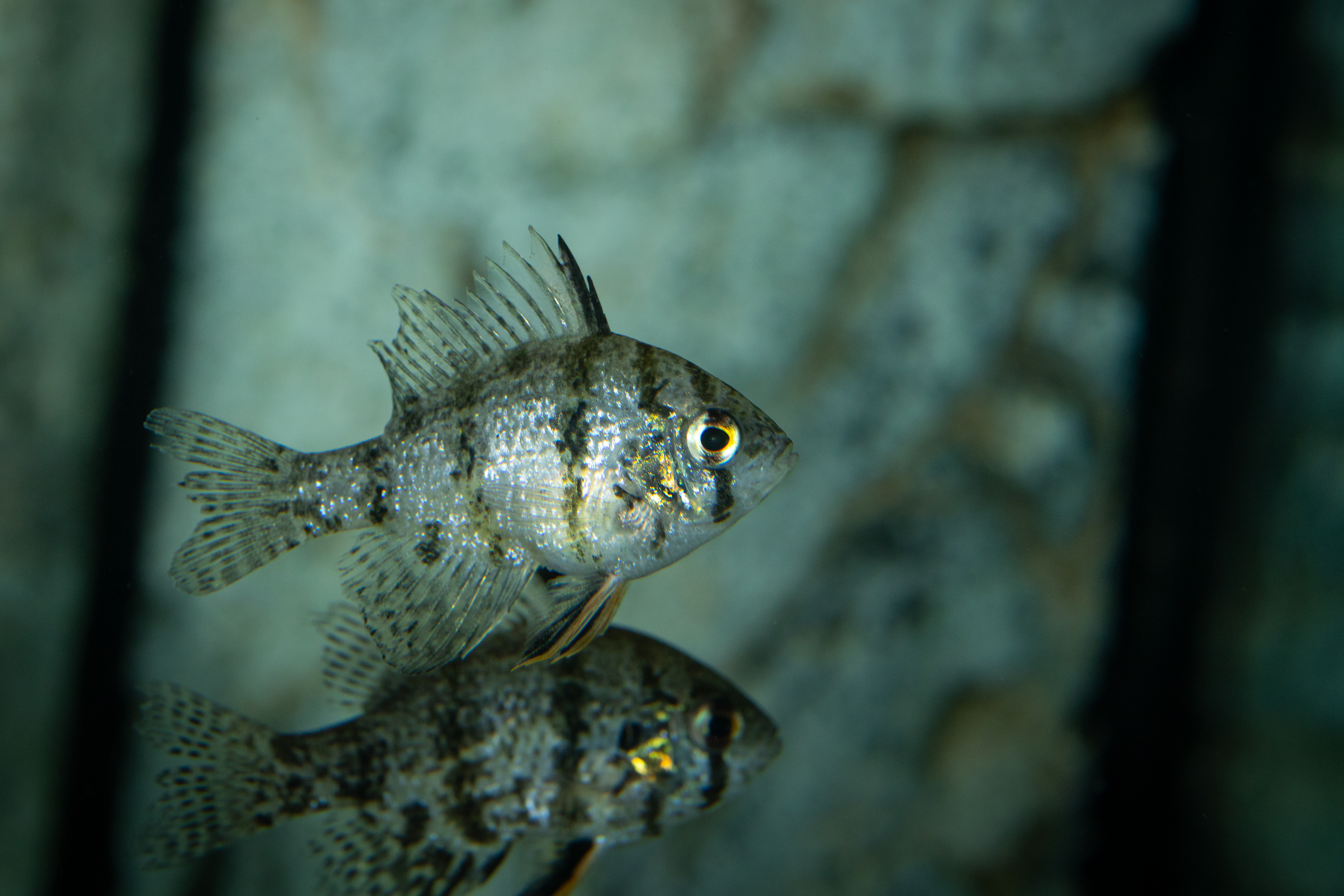

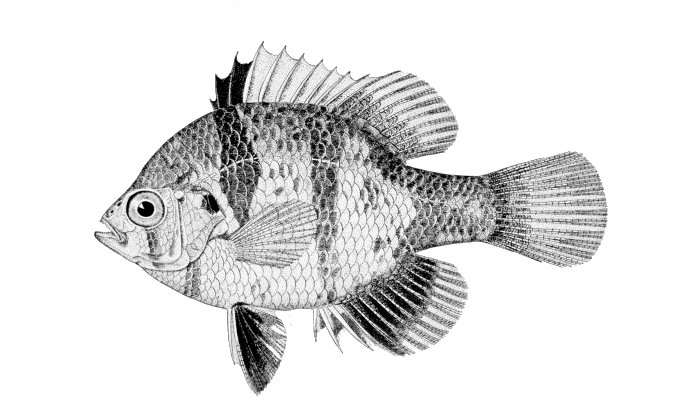

Conservation status
- Near Threatened (IUCN 3.1)

Scientific classification
- Kingdom: Animalia
- Phylum: Chordata
- Class: Actinopterygii
- Order: Centrarchiformes
- Family: Centrarchidae
- Genus: Enneacanthus
- Species: E. chaetodon

Binomial name
- Enneacanthus chaetodon (Baird, 1855)

Synonyms
- Pomotis chaetodon Baird, 1855; Mesogonistius chaetodon (Baird, 1855)

= Blackbanded sunfish =

Species of fish

The blackbanded sunfish (Enneacanthus chaetodon) is a freshwater fish species of the sunfish family (Centrarchidae). They are found in the United States ranging from New Jersey to central Florida. The defining feature of this blackbanded sunfish is the black vertical strips that it has on both sides of its body. The term "Enneacanthus" comes from the Greek terms ennea, which means "nine times", and acanthi, which means "thorn". It is in a genus that consists of only three species along with the Banded sunfish (Enneacanthus obesus) and the Bluespotted sunfish (Enneacanthus gloriosus). Collectively, they are commonly referred to as the "banded sunfish" or "little sunfish".

== Description ==
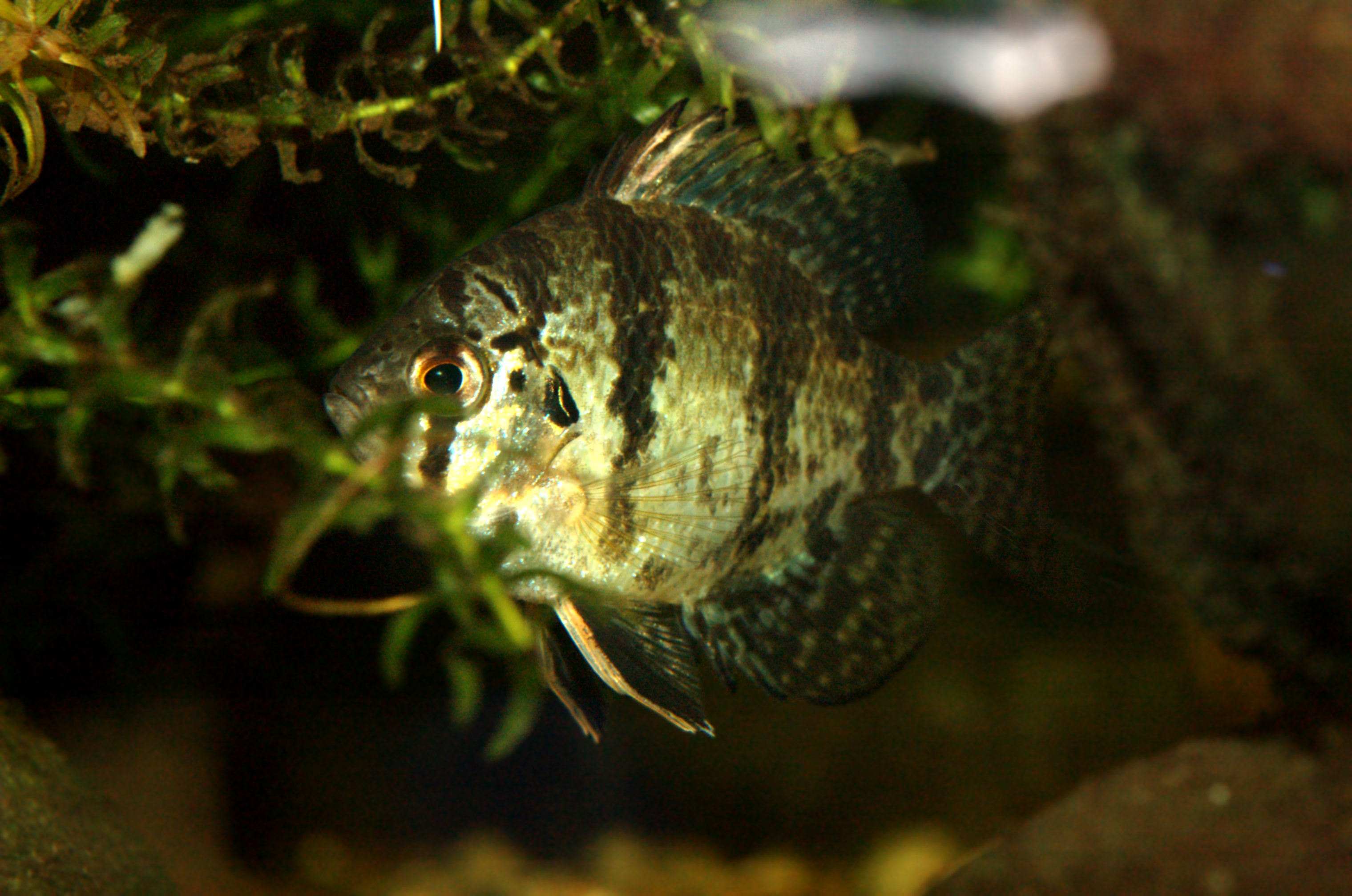
Specimen in an aquarium.

The blackbanded sunfish is fairly small, maximum length of 10 cm, with an average life span of 3–4 years. The average length of this sunfish is around 6 centimeters. The blackbanded sunfish has a very compressed, deep body with a small mouth but big lower jaw extending upwards. Its gill cover has a black spot, and the dorsal (top), anal (back/bottom), and caudal (tail) fins are black-mottled. Its dorsal fin stands upright with 10 spines and the tail fin is somewhat rounded. The body coloration is mostly a shiny silver with yellow spots. The blackbanded sunfish gets its name from the six black vertical lines on each side, starting with the first line running through its eye and five more vertical lines back to the tail fin.

=== Sexual dimorphism ===
Generally the males are heavier and more colorful than the females. The males also are larger with longer fins, while the females become plumper when ripe with eggs.

== Habitat ==
Blackbanded sunfish are found in the United States from New Jersey to central Florida. There are also reports that these fish are in the Delaware Valley, but there have not been any success in collecting fish from this area. Blackbanded sunfish are restricted to shallow, low-velocity, non-turbid waters of lakes, ponds, rivers and streams. They are strongly associated with aquatic plants, because it provides them with a habitat for foraging and cover. The fish population has been hurt over the past few years due to poor water conditions and pollution.

== Diet ==
Blackbanded sunfish are carnivores. In most locations, midge larvae are the predominant food source for Black-banded sunfish. However they also consume a wide variety of zooplankton, aquatic insects, and crustaceans.

== Behavior ==
The blackbanded sunfish is a peaceful, friendly fish that likes to group with others of the same species. They can, however, become aggressive and territorial when spawning.

== Reproduction ==
Like other sunfish, male blackbanded sunfish stake out a nest site, normally among plants. Females lay their eggs in the nest, and then the males will drive them off. The males will guard their eggs until hatching and sometimes perhaps for a week after until the fry are free swimming.

== Threats and protection needs ==
The blackbanded sunfish is critically imperiled and vulnerable in much of its range along the Atlantic. Some of its reasons of decline are because of drying of ponds and swamps as well as contamination of water by pesticides. Also, taking of blackbanded sunfish for aquariums poses a threat for their populations in Virginia.
