= Knifefish =

Knifefish may refer to several knife-shaped fishes:

- The Neotropical or weakly electric knifefishes, order Gymnotiformes, containing five families:
  - Family Gymnotidae (banded knifefishes and the electric eel)
  - Family Rhamphichthyidae (sand knifefishes)
  - Family Hypopomidae (bluntnose knifefishes)
  - Family Sternopygidae (glass and rat-tail knifefishes)
  - Family Apteronotidae (ghost knifefishes)
- The featherbacks, family Notopteridae.
- The aba, Gymnarchus niloticus
- Four other unrelated fish species not in any of the above families:
  - Grey knifefish, Bathystethus cultratus.
  - Blue knifefish, Labracoglossa nitida.
  - Collared knifefish or finscale razorfish, Cymolutes torquatus.
  - Jack-knifefish, Equetus lanceolatus.

== See also ==
- Knifefish (robot), an American military robot
