= Mao Mao =

Mao Mao may refer to:

- Blue mao mao, a species of sea chub
- Mao Mao (director), director of 2012 Chinese film Here Then
- Mao Mao: Heroes of Pure Heart, an American animated television series
- Mao Mao Uprising, a Kenyan uprising
