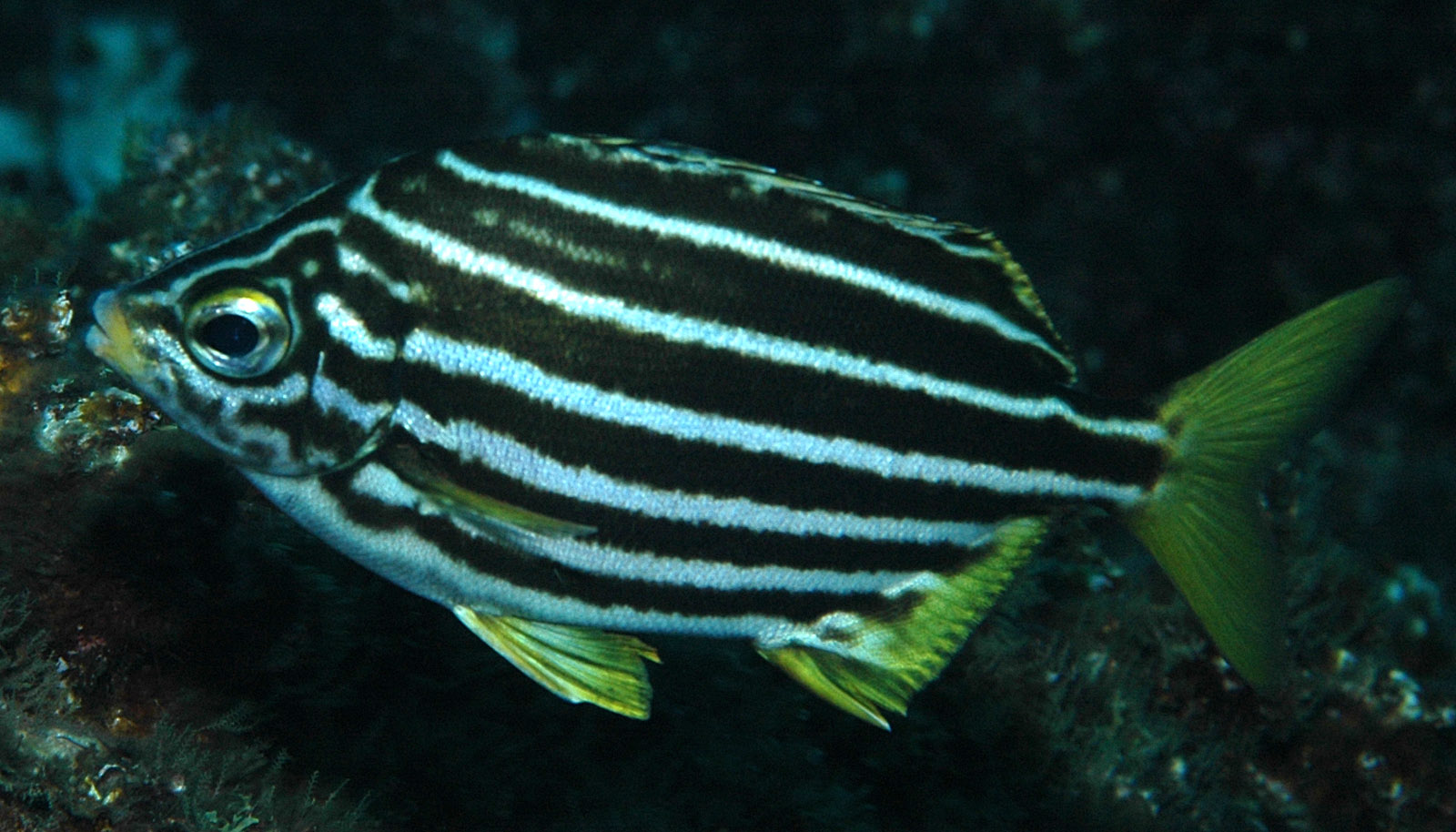
- Eastern footballer (A. latus)

Scientific classification
- Kingdom: Animalia
- Phylum: Chordata
- Class: Actinopterygii
- Division: Teleostei
- Order: Centrarchiformes
- Suborder: Terapontoidei
- Family: Microcanthidae
- Genus: Atypichthys; Günther, 1862

Type species
- Atypus strigatus Günther, 1860

Synonyms
- Atypus Günther, 1860 (preoccupied); Helotosoma Kaup, 1863

= Atypichthys =

Genus of ray-finned fishes

Atypichthys is a genus of ray-finned fish native to inshore waters from Australia to New Zealand and the Kermadec Islands, with currently two recognized species:

Species	Common name	Image
Atypichthys latus McCulloch & Waite, 1916	New Zealand mado	
Atypichthys strigatus (Günther, 1860)	Australian mado	
