= Microcanthus =

- M. strigatus
- M. joyceae

Scientific classification
- Kingdom: Animalia
- Phylum: Chordata
- Class: Actinopterygii
- Division: Teleostei
- Order: Centrarchiformes
- Suborder: Terapontoidei
- Family: Microcanthidae
- Genus: Microcanthus; Swainson, 1839

Type species
- Chaetodon strigatus Cuvier, 1831

Synonyms
- Helotosoma Kaup, 1863; Neochaetodon Castelnau, 1873; Therapaina Kaup, 1860

Genus of ray-finned fishes

Microcanthus is a genus of stripeys with an antitropical distribution in the Pacific Ocean.

== Taxonomy ==
The genus Microcanthus is composed of three main clades. The western Australian clade and east Asian clade together form M. strigatus. The eastern Australian clade is M. joyceae. The fifth body stripe inflects downwards in the former, and is straight in the latter.

Species	Common name	Image
Microcanthus strigatus (Cuvier, 1831)	stripey	
Microcanthus joyceae Whitley, 1931	East-Australian stripey	
