= Caesioscorpis =

Scientific classification
- Kingdom: Animalia
- Phylum: Chordata
- Class: Actinopterygii
- Order: Centrarchiformes
- Suborder: Terapontoidei
- Family: Caesioscorpididae; Randall & Parenti, 2020
- Genus: Caesioscorpis; Whitley, 1945
- Species: C. theagenes

Binomial name
- Caesioscorpis theagenes Whitley, 1945

Genus of fishes

Caesioscorpis theagenes, also known as the blowhole perch, fusilier sweep, or southern fusilier, is a species of marine ray-finned fish endemic to the southwestern coast of Australia. It is the only species in the genus Caesioscorpis and of the family Caesioscorpididae, the blowhole perches.

Its phylogenetic affinities were long uncertain, with it being placed as an indeterminate member of the Serranidae for many decades after its description. It was only in 2020 that it was found to belong to the recently-circumscribed Centrarchiformes and forming its own family. The genus name is thought to be a portmanteau of two different fish genera, Caesio and Scorpis, referencing its physical similarities to both genera. It is relatively closely related to the latter, although phylogenetic evidence suggests that its closest relatives are the stripeys (family Microcanthidae).

It is a slender, schooling fish with an overall silvery coloration, with a greenish-yellow back.
