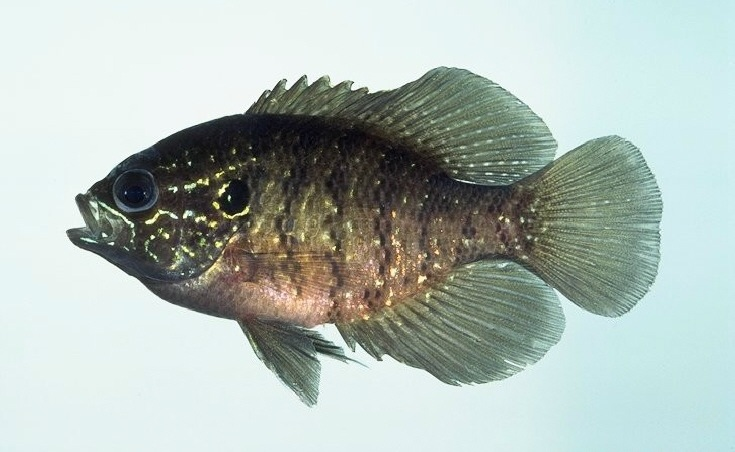
- Enneacanthus obesus

Scientific classification
- Kingdom: Animalia
- Phylum: Chordata
- Class: Actinopterygii
- Order: Centrarchiformes
- Family: Centrarchidae
- Subfamily: Centrarchinae
- Genus: Enneacanthus; T. N. Gill, 1864

Type species
- Enneacanthus obesus Girard, 1854

= Enneacanthus =

Genus of ray-finned fishes

Enneacanthus is a genus of freshwater ray-finned fish in the sunfish family (Centrarchidae) of order Centrarchiformes. The type species is E. obesus, the banded sunfish, and the species of this genus are known collectively as the banded or little sunfishes.

The Enneacanthus species, all of which grow to a maximum overall length of about 10 cm (4 in), are native to freshwater lakes, ponds, and estuaries along the Atlantic and Gulf coasts of the United States.

All three species are kept as aquarium fish by hobbyists.

== Etymology ==
The generic name Enneacanthus derives from the Greek εννέα (nine) and άκανθα (thorn).

== Species ==
The currently recognized species in this genus are:

Image	Scientific name	Common name	Distribution
	Enneacanthus chaetodon (S. F. Baird, 1855)	black-banded sunfish	
	Enneacanthus gloriosus (Holbrook, 1855)	blue-spotted sunfish	
	Enneacanthus obesus (Girard, 1854)	banded sunfish	
