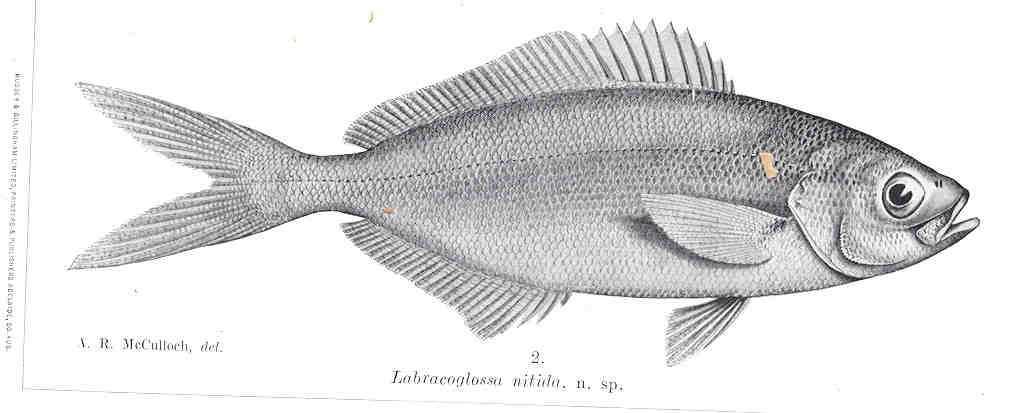

Scientific classification
- Kingdom: Animalia
- Phylum: Chordata
- Class: Actinopterygii
- Order: Centrarchiformes
- Family: Scorpididae
- Genus: Labracoglossa
- Species: L. nitida

Binomial name
- Labracoglossa nitida McCulloch & Waite, 1916

= Blue knifefish =

Species of ray-finned fish

The blue knifefish (Labracoglossa nitida) is a species of marine ray-finned fish, a member of the family Scorpididae. It is native to the Pacific Ocean waters off eastern Australia over to New Zealand, where it occurs at depths reaching from the surface to 20 m (66 ft) in inshore waters over reefs. It can reach a length of 20 cm (7.9 in), though most do not exceed 15 cm (5.9 in).
