= Sea sweep =

Scientific classification
- Kingdom: Animalia
- Phylum: Chordata
- Class: Actinopterygii
- Division: Teleostei
- Order: Centrarchiformes
- Family: Scorpididae
- Genus: Scorpis
- Species: S. aequipinnis

Binomial name
- Scorpis aequipinnis Richardson, 1848

Species of fish

The sea sweep (Scorpis aequipinnis), also known as the maomao, snapjack, or sweep is a species of marine ray-finned fish from the family Scorpididae. It is native to the southwestern Pacific Ocean from Australia to New Zealand.

== Taxonomy ==
The sea sweep was first formally described by John Richardson in 1848.

== Distribution ==
In Australia the species is known from the southern coast of New South Wales, around the south of the country and north to the central coast of Western Australia, and in Port Phillip Bay, Victoria.

== Description ==
Young juvenile, in Western Australia
Juvenile, at Victoria
In South Australia

The sea sweep has deep and strongly compressed body with a thin caudal peduncle. The head is moderately sized with an almost straight dorsal profile, a short snout and quite large eyes. The mouth is small and oblique with small but strong teeth in the jaws arranged in broad bands with the outer band being enlarged and recurved. Most of the body is covered in very small ctenoid scales and there is a gently curved lateral line. The dorsal fin continuous with a very short first spine, there are a 10 spines which progressively become higher towards the tail, the first rays in the soft-rayed portion of the dorsal fin is only slightly higher than the spiny portion giving the dorsal fin an almost straight profile. The soft-rayed part of the dorsal fin contains 26-28 soft rays. The anal fin has 3 spines and 27-28 soft rays. The soft portion of the dorsal fin is notably longer than they spiny portion. It has small pectoral fin are small with the uppermost rays being the longest. The pelvic fins are also small and are located below and to the rear of the pectoral fins.

Sea sweeps are grey ventrally, often with a tinge of blue, green, or sometimes brown. The belly is silvery. There are two indistinct dusky bands on the upper sides. This species can reach a length of 40cm and 3.5kg.

== Habitat and biology ==
In Victoria, with ruler for scale

Sea sweeps are a schooling species that are seen in small aggregations to large schools often feeding on plankton. Adult sea sweeps are found on coastal reefs at depths down to at least 50 metres (160 ft), It feeds on plankton over rock reefs where it forms schools while juveniles settle in tide pools and can be found in the brackish waters of estuaries.

=== Reproduction ===
They spawn in the winter with the peak breeding season between May and August. The eggs are pelagic. The young fish grow very quickly for the first 2–3 years but growth slows down significantly after sexual maturity, although they may live over 50 years. Sea sweeps have separate sexes.

== Fisheries ==
The sea sweep is of secondary importance as a target for commercial fisheries and is caught using purse seines and trap nets.
