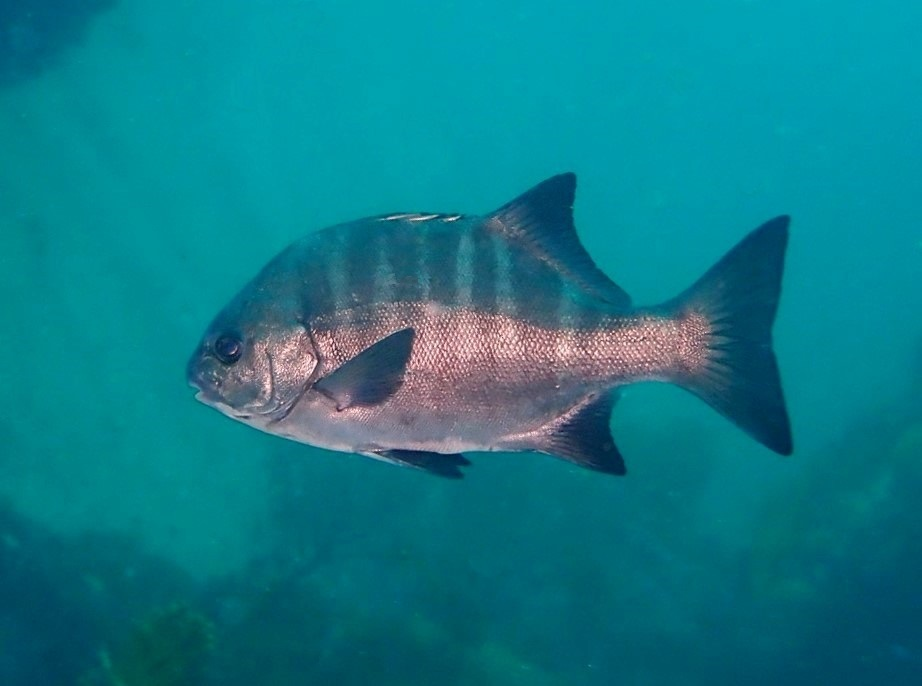

Scientific classification
- Kingdom: Animalia
- Phylum: Chordata
- Class: Actinopterygii
- Division: Teleostei
- Order: Centrarchiformes
- Family: Dichistiidae
- Genus: Dichistius
- Species: D. capensis

Binomial name
- Dichistius capensis (G. Cuvier, 1831)

Synonyms
- List: Dipterodon capensis G. Cuvier, 1831; Coracinus capensis (G. Cuvier, 1831); Coracinus aper Gronow, 1854; Dichistius falcatus J. L. B. Smith, 1935

= Galjoen =

Species of fish

The galjoen, black bream, or blackfish (Dichistius capensis) is a species of marine fish found only along the coast of South Africa, Namibia and Angola. Galjoen is the national fish of South Africa.

== Distribution and habitat ==
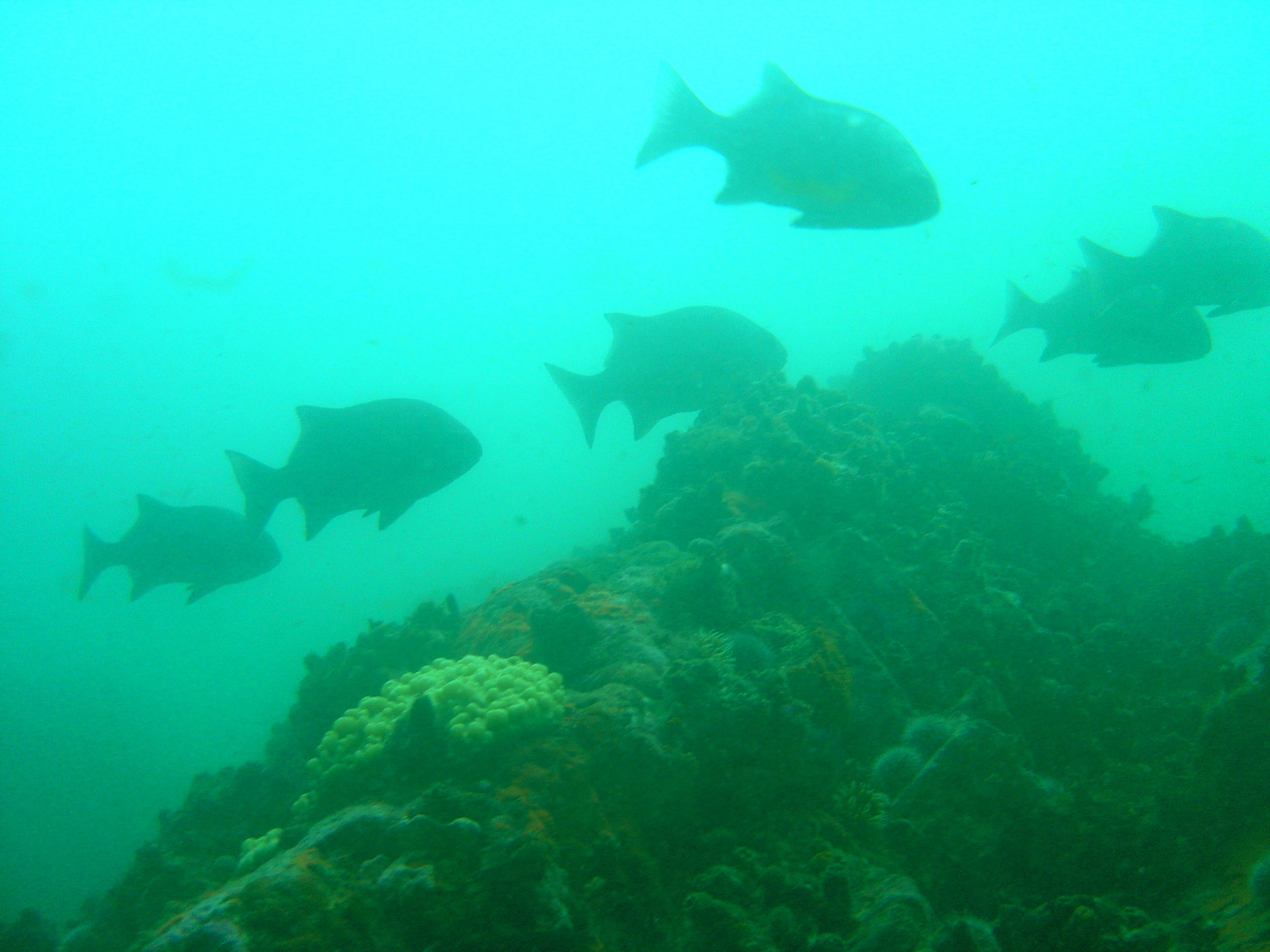
Galjoen at Rocky Bay

The galjoen is indigenous to the coasts of southern Africa from Angola to South Africa, and is generally found around reefs at shallow depths around 10 m (33 ft), often near the shore.

== Description ==
This species can reach 80 cm (31 in) in total length and a weight of 6.5 kg (14 lb). The body is compressed, and the fins are well developed, with prominent spines, 10 of them, with between 18 and 23 rays. The anal fin has three spines, and usually 13 or 14 rays, the pelvic fins have 1 spine and 5 rays, and the pectoral fins are typically shorter than the head. The body, fins, and head, with the except of the front of the snout, are covered in scales. The lips are thick, with strong curved incisors at the front of the mouth, with smaller teeth behind the front incisors.

== Ecology ==
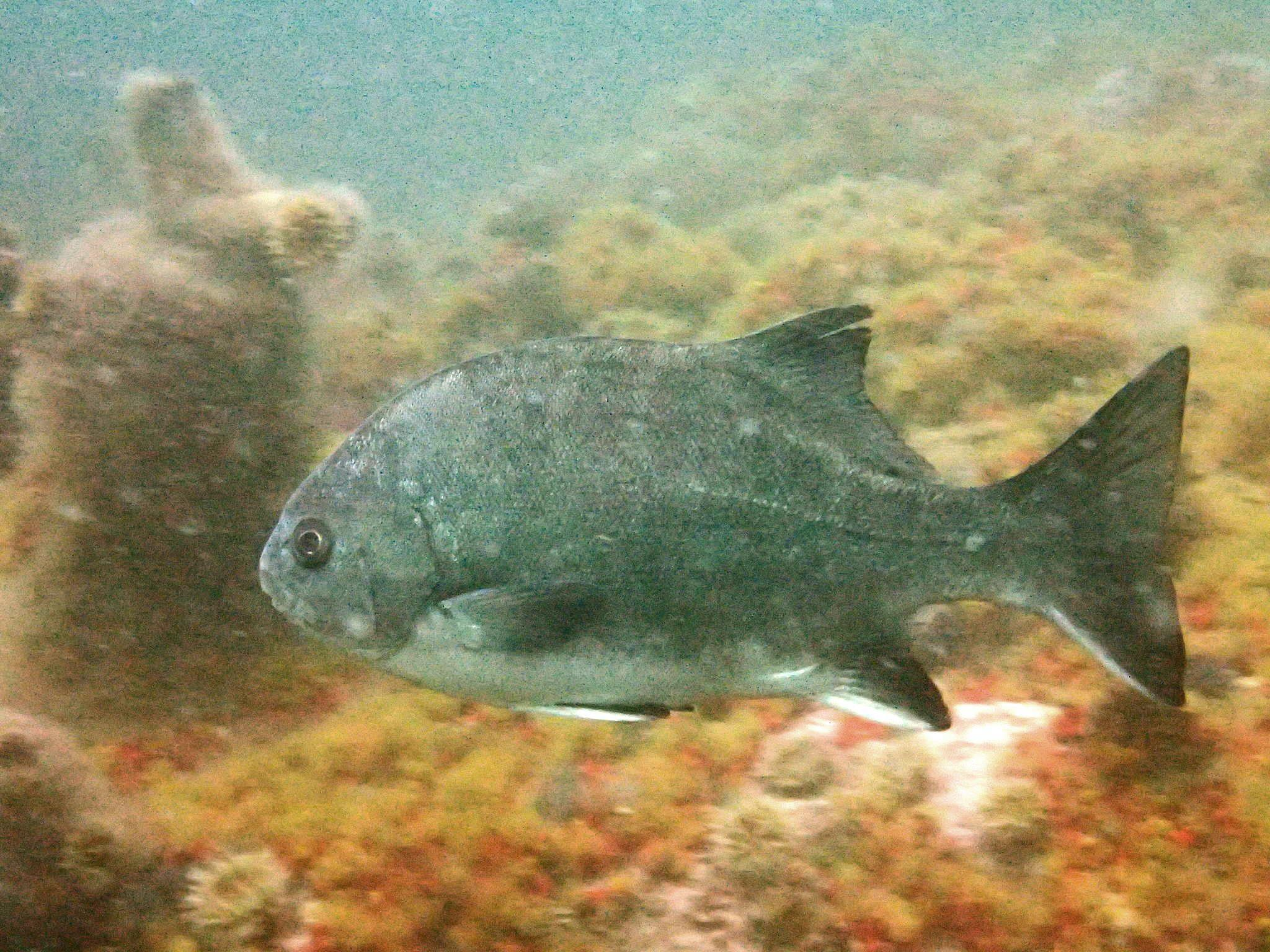
Galjoen at Castor Rock

=== Diet ===
The species usually feeds on red and coraline seaweed and red bait, small mussels and barnacles found off rocky shores, and appear in particular to be a partial to the white mussels residing in the sandy beaches and inlets of the rocky outcrops along the southern coast.

=== Home area ===
In 2005, the movements of the species were extensively studied. Some 25,000 galjoen were tagged at four sites in reserves in South Africa and their overall movement was found to remain localised, with some 95% of fish studied seeming to frequent a particular area.

== Conservation status ==
According to the South African Association for Marine Biological Research, the population of the galljoen is depleted at less than 20% of its optimal size; the existing stock is maintained due to natural refuges and no-take MPAs.

In the 2018 National Biodiversity Assessment by SANBI, it is listed as Near Threatened. It is listed on the South African Sustainable Seafood Initiative List as a red-listed fish that cannot be sold nor bought; only recreational anglers with a permit may catch a minimum size of 35 cm with a limit of 2 a day.

== Importance to humans ==
=== Fishing ===
It is important to local commercial fisheries and is also popular as a game fish.

=== As food ===
Due to their abundance in the shores off South Africa, galjoen is common in South African cuisine. A notable dish is the fish sprinkled with pepper and lemon — or alternatively with lemon, mayonnaise, and melted garlic butter — and served with fresh bread and apricot jam.

=== As the national fish of South Africa ===
Galjoen is the national fish of South Africa. The suggestion to make it the national fish came from Margaret Smith, the wife of ichthyologist J. L. B. Smith, to find a marine equivalent to the springbok.

== Etymology ==
The scientific name of Coracinus capensis is a reference to its black colour when found in rocky areas, Coracinus meaning "raven" or "black coloured"; in sandy areas it gives off a silver-bronze colour.
