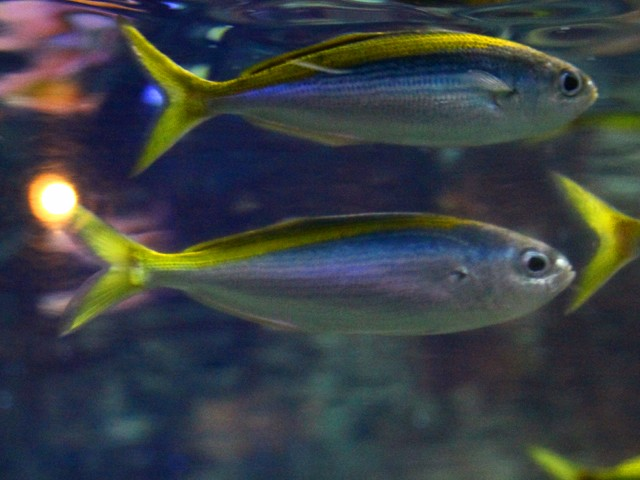
- Labracoglossa argentiventris

Scientific classification
- Domain: Eukaryota
- Kingdom: Animalia
- Phylum: Chordata
- Class: Actinopterygii
- Order: Centrarchiformes
- Family: Kyphosidae
- Subfamily: Scorpidinae
- Genus: Labracoglossa; W. K. H. Peters, 1866

Type species
- Labracoglossa argenteiventris W. K. H. Peters, 1866

= Labracoglossa =

Genus of ray-finned fishes

Labracoglossa is a genus of ray-finned fish native to the western Pacific Ocean.

== Species ==
There are currently two recognized species in this genus:

- Labracoglossa argenteiventris W. K. H. Peters, 1866
- Labracoglossa nitida McCulloch & Waite, 1916 (Blue knifefish)
