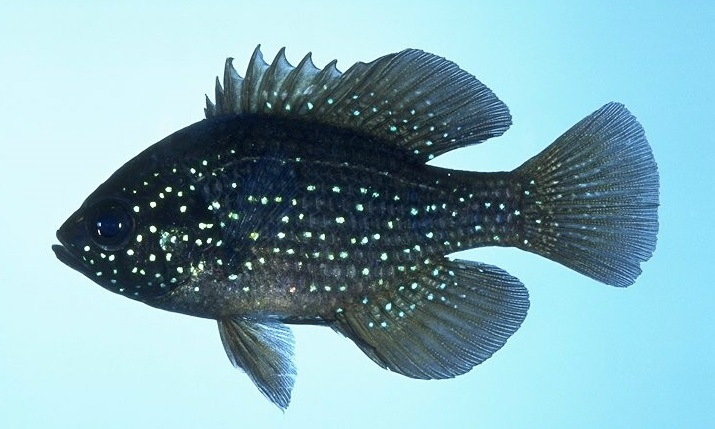

Conservation status
- Least Concern (IUCN 3.1)

Scientific classification
- Kingdom: Animalia
- Phylum: Chordata
- Class: Actinopterygii
- Division: Teleostei
- Order: Centrarchiformes
- Family: Centrarchidae
- Genus: Enneacanthus
- Species: E. gloriosus

Binomial name
- Enneacanthus gloriosus (Holbrook, 1855)

Synonyms
- Bryttus gloriosus Holbrook, 1855; Hemioplites simulans Cope, 1868; Enneacanthus simulans (Cope, 1868)

= Bluespotted sunfish =

Species of fish

The bluespotted sunfish (Enneacanthus gloriosus) is a species of fish in the family Centrarchidae, the sunfishes. It is native to the southeastern and eastern United States, its distribution extending as far north as New Jersey, Pennsylvania, and far southern New York. It is native throughout most of its range, but some populations represent introductions, such as those in Lake Ontario and the upper Susquehanna River system.

In many areas, this fish is sympatric with a closely related member of its genus, the banded sunfish (E. obesus). The two species are hard to tell apart. They are known to hybridize.

== Description ==
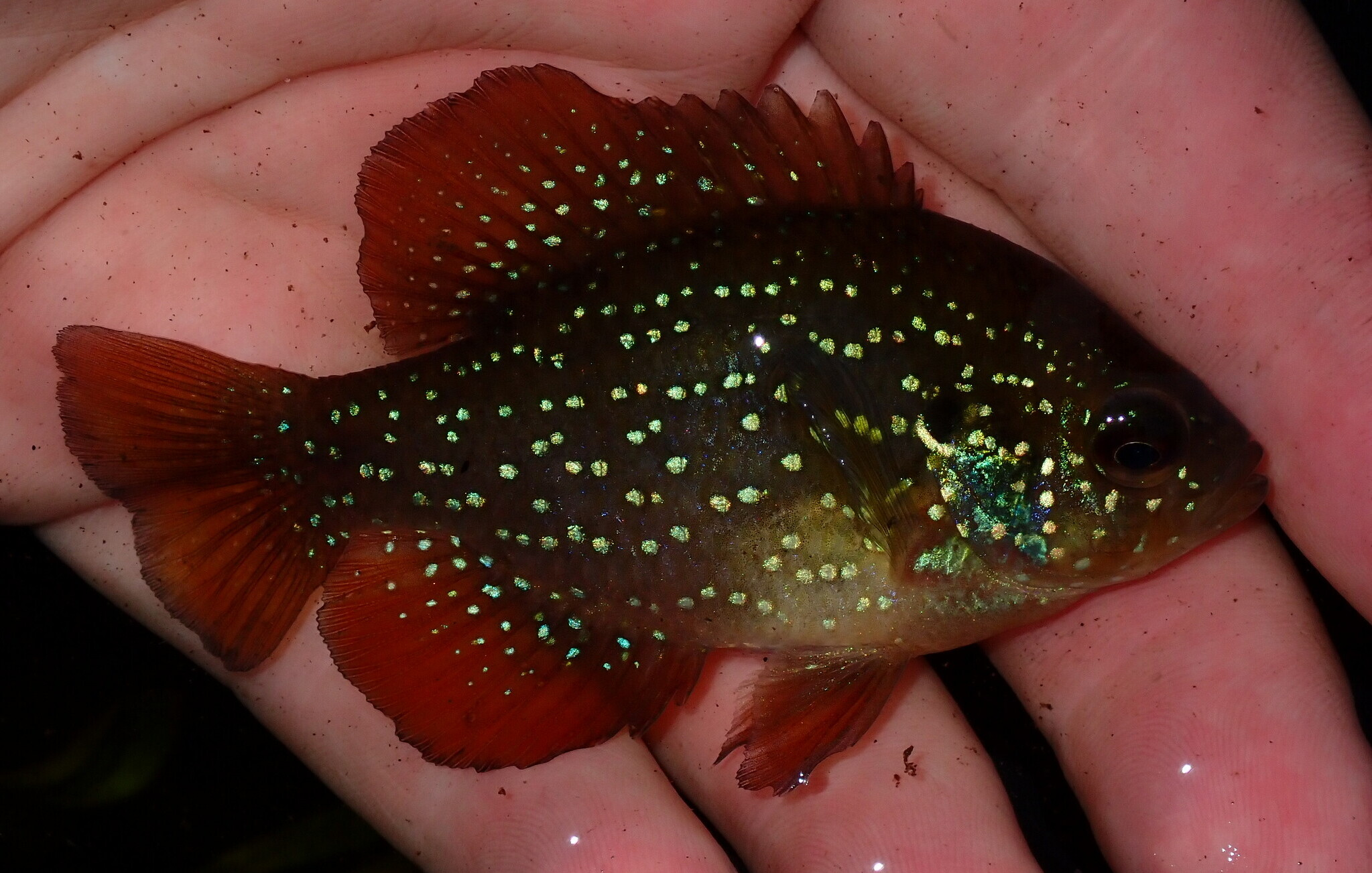
In New Jersey

This fish reaches about 9.5 centimeters (3.7 in) in maximum length. It is one of the smallest fish in its family. It has spines in its dorsal and anal fins. Its tail fin is rounded in outline. Its body is covered in white or blue dots. Some individuals have iridescent spots. There may be a few pale bars on its sides, but these are rare, especially in adults.

A number of parasitic flatworms have been observed in this fish, such as Gyrodactylus gloriosi and several Urocleidus species.

== Habitat ==
Several aspects of the life history of the fish vary geographically. Fish on the Eastern Seaboard are larger than individuals in Mississippi, for example. The fish becomes sexually mature at larger sizes in more northern latitudes. This may be because fish in milder climates can begin reproductive investment earlier, putting their energy into gonadal growth instead of body growth at younger ages. Fish in the east can reach a maximum age around five years, but fish in the south generally do not reach that age. The spawning season is also much longer in southern regions, probably because of warmer temperatures and longer photoperiod.

This freshwater fish occupies ponds, lakes, creeks, streams, and medium-sized rivers. It can tolerate slightly brackish water in areas near the coast. It thrives in small backwaters filled with vegetation and tree roots.

This species is sometimes kept as an aquarium pet.

== Reproduction ==
The fish spawns several times in a season, sometimes daily for a long period of time. The male builds a nest in the substrate or in plant matter. Clutch sizes of 42 to 216 have been observed.

== Diet ==
The diet of the fish is rich in plankton. It consumes cyclopoid copepods, water fleas, midge larvae, ostracods, amphipods, and snails. Its preference for tiny aquatic larvae makes it a suitable mosquito control agent.
