= Western footballer =

- In Western Australia

Conservation status
- Least Concern (IUCN 3.1)

Scientific classification
- Kingdom: Animalia
- Phylum: Chordata
- Class: Actinopterygii
- Division: Teleostei
- Order: Centrarchiformes
- Suborder: Terapontoidei
- Family: Microcanthidae
- Genus: Neatypus; Waite, 1905
- Species: N. obliquus

Binomial name
- Neatypus obliquus Waite, 1905

Species of ray-finned fish

The western footballer (Neatypus obliquus), also known as the footballer sweep, is a species of ray-finned fish endemic to southern reefs of Australia, where it can be found down to 30 m (100 ft). It can also be found in the aquarium trade. This species is currently the only known member of its genus.

The compressed body is silvery-blue, with orange to yellow diagonal striping bordered by a brownish black; fins match the shade of yellowy-orange. They reach a maximum length of 22 cm (8.7 in).

It occurs near inshore and offshore reefs of the southern Australia coast in active and large schools. The range is from Shark Bay, to Flinders Island, South Australia. They feed on benthic zone invertebrates and zooplankton.

Other species of its family are known as footballers, for the similarity to footballer's striped jumpers.
