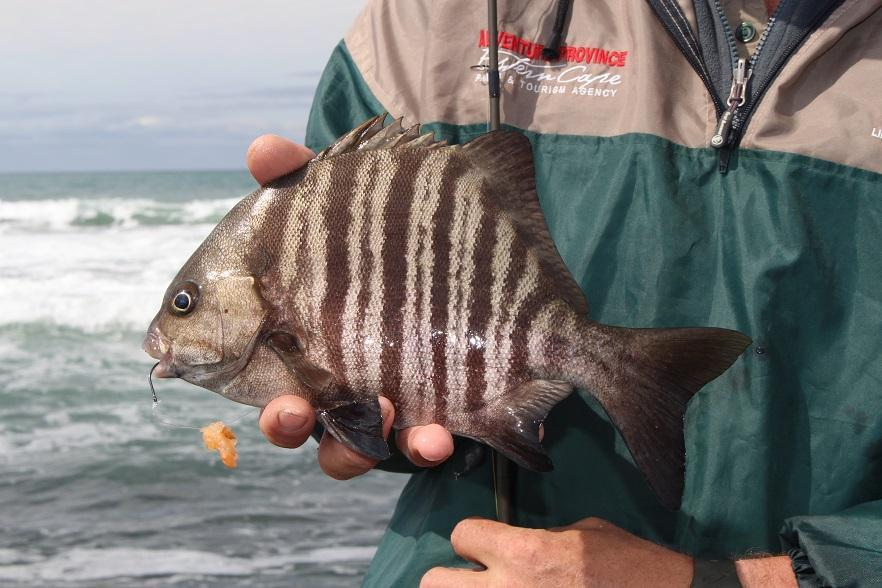

Scientific classification
- Kingdom: Animalia
- Phylum: Chordata
- Class: Actinopterygii
- Order: Centrarchiformes
- Family: Dichistiidae
- Genus: Dichistius
- Species: D. multifasciatus

Binomial name
- Dichistius multifasciatus (Pellegrin, 1914)

= Dichistius multifasciatus =

Species of ray-finned fish

Dichistius multifasciatus, the banded galjoen, is a species of ray-finned fish that occurs on the south and east coast of South Africa and also on Madagascar. The fish can reach a length of up to 35 cm and weigh 1.7 kg. The fish is brown/black with 15-20 brown vertical stripes and prefers the warmer waters. Occurs in turbulent rocky beaches.
