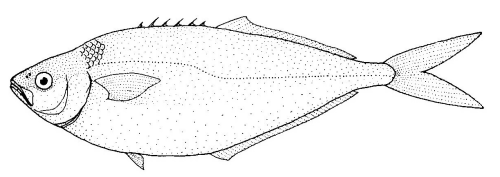
- Grey Knifefish (B. cultratus)

Scientific classification
- Kingdom: Animalia
- Phylum: Chordata
- Class: Actinopterygii
- Order: Centrarchiformes
- Family: Scorpididae
- Genus: Bathystethus; T. N. Gill, 1893

Type species
- Cichla cultrata Bloch & J. G. Schneider, 1801

Synonyms
- Platystethus Günther, 1860 (pre-occupied)

= Bathystethus =

Genus of ray-finned fishes

Bathystethus is a genus of ray-finned fish native to the Pacific Ocean.

== Species ==
There are currently two recognized species in this genus:

- Bathystethus cultratus (Bloch & J. G. Schneider, 1801) (Grey knifefish)
- Bathystethus orientale Regan, 1913 (Silver knifefish)
