= Moonlighter (fish) =

- In Western Australia

Scientific classification
- Kingdom: Animalia
- Phylum: Chordata
- Class: Actinopterygii
- Division: Teleostei
- Order: Centrarchiformes
- Suborder: Terapontoidei
- Family: Microcanthidae
- Genus: Tilodon; Thominot, 1888
- Species: T. sexfasciatus

Binomial name
- Tilodon sexfasciatus (J. Richardson, 1842)

Synonyms
- Genus: Paracoradion Ahl, 1923; Vinculum McCulloch, 1914; Species: Chaetodon sexfasciatus J. Richardson, 1842; Vinculum sexfasciatum (J. Richardson, 1842)

Species of ray-finned fish

The moonlighter (Tilodon sexfasciatus), is a species of marine ray-finned fish, a member of the family Microcanthidae. It is endemic to southern Australia, where adults can be found on rocky reefs to depths of 120 m (390 ft). Juveniles are found in much shallower waters of coves and estuaries. This species grows to 40 cm (16 in) TL. This fish is commercially important and can also be found in the aquarium trade. This species is the only known member of the genus Tilodon.

Growth series: from young juvenile (left) to adult (right)

== Gallery ==
In South Australia

In Victoria
