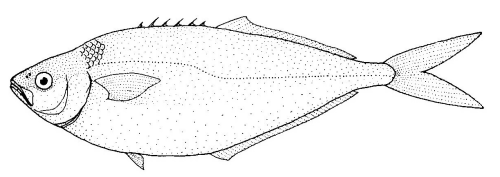
- Drawing by Dr Tony Ayling

Scientific classification
- Kingdom: Animalia
- Phylum: Chordata
- Class: Actinopterygii
- Order: Centrarchiformes
- Family: Scorpididae
- Genus: Bathystethus
- Species: B. cultratus

Binomial name
- Bathystethus cultratus (Bloch & J. G. Schneider, 1801)

Synonyms
- Cichla cultrata Bloch & J. G. Schneider, 1801; Sciaena cultrata J. R. Forster, 1801 (ambiguous); Platystethus guentheri J. D. Ogilby, 1889

= Grey knifefish =

Species of ray-finned fish

The grey knifefish (Bathystethus cultratus) is a species of ray-finned fish native to the Pacific Ocean from Australia to New Zealand and the Kermadec Islands. This species is a plankton eater which swims constantly within a few meters of the surface of the ocean. This species can reach a length of 30 cm (12 in).
