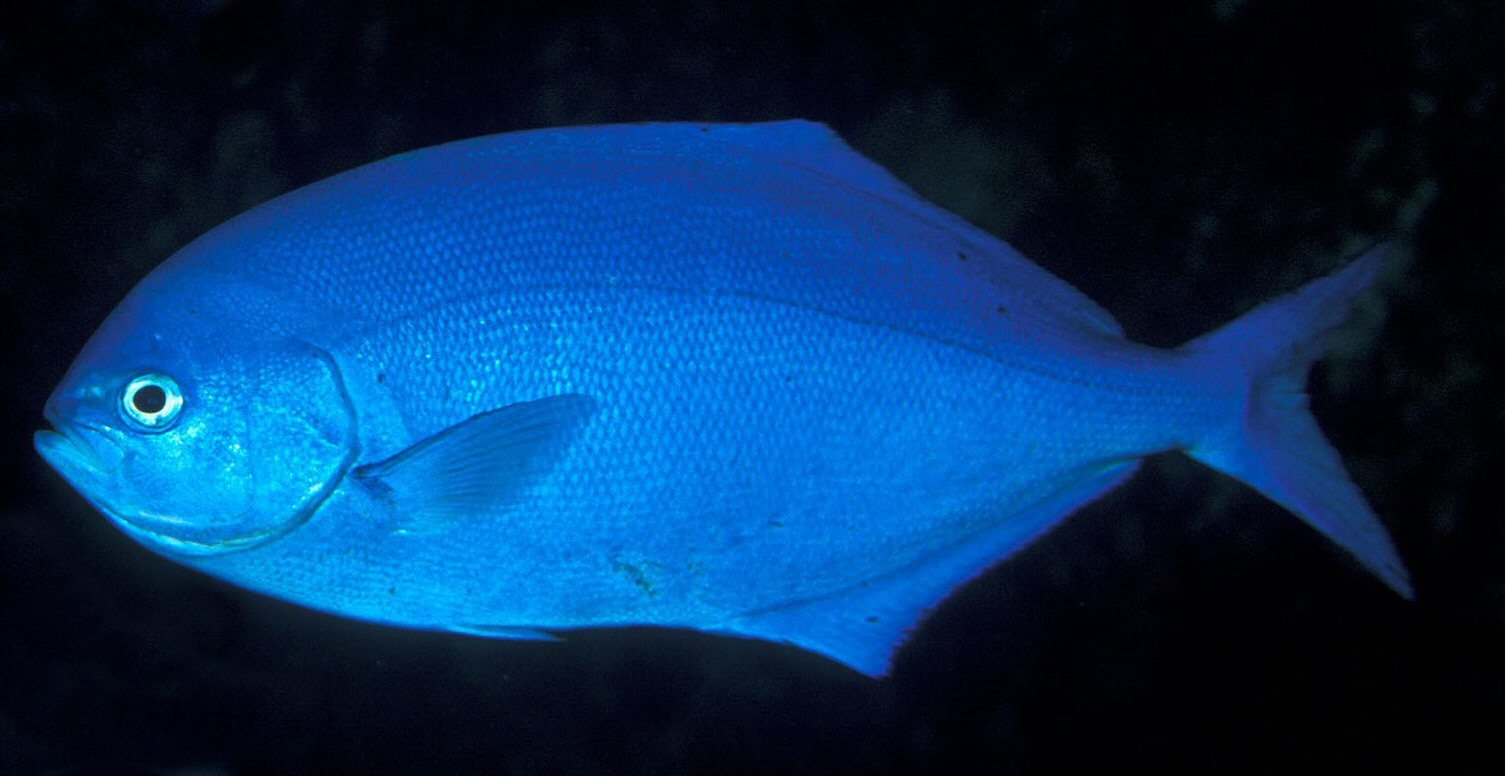

Scientific classification
- Kingdom: Animalia
- Phylum: Chordata
- Class: Actinopterygii
- Division: Teleostei
- Order: Centrarchiformes
- Family: Scorpididae
- Genus: Scorpis
- Species: S. violacea

Binomial name
- Scorpis violacea (F. W. Hutton, 1873)

Synonyms
- Ditrema violacea F. W. Hutton, 1873; Scorpis violaceus (F. W. Hutton, 1873)

= Blue maomao =

Species of fish

The blue maomao (Scorpis violacea), also known as the violet sweep, blue sweep or hardbelly, is a species of marine ray-finned fish, a member of the subfamily Scorpidinae, part of the sea chub family Kyphosidae. It is native to the southwestern Pacific Ocean from Australia to New Zealand and the Kermadec Islands, where it can be found in inshore waters from the surface to depths of 30 m (98 ft). This fish can reach a length of 40 cm (16 in). It is commercially important and is also a popular game fish.

== Taxonomy ==
The blue maomao was first formally described in 1873 as Ditrema violacea by Frederick Hutton with the type locality given as Wellington.

== Distribution ==
Blue maomao are found in the southwestern Pacific Ocean around North Island, New Zealand, the Kermadec Islands and have been recorded in Australia.

== Description ==
Juvenile, in New Zealand

The blue maomao has a laterally, compressed and relatively deep body with a noticeably forked tail. They have protrusible jaws, equipped with a number of rows of small, closely set teeth, which are used to capture larger zooplankton. The adults are deep blue dorsally and pale ventrally, at night they change colour to a mottled dark green. The juveniles are grey with a yellow anal fin. They can grow to a fork length of 45 centimetres (18 in). The dorsal fin has 9 spines and 27 soft rays and the anal fin has 2 spines and 25 soft rays.

== Habitat and biology ==
Juvenile, in New Zealand

Schooling, in New Zealand

The blue maomao is a schooling fish of inshore waters, especially rocky areas, which feed on zooplankton although when zooplankton are scarce they will graze on algae. When feeding in schools chasing shrimps near the surface they can cause the water to foam. Each fish has a favoured sleeping spot among the rocks during the night and they change colour from blue to mottle green at night. Occasionally they will sleep in groups over sheltered, sandy areas. They are tactile fish and when not feeding will rub themselves on pebbles and they will also visit cleaner fish when there is no apparent need for them to be cleaned. They spawn from September to November and the juveniles are recorded from October to December, the eggs are 0.8 mm in diameter and contain an oil droplet. These fish can live to be 15 years old.

== Fisheries ==
Blue maomao are a quarry for commercial fisheries in New Zealand where 3,518 kilograms (7,756 lb) were landed in 2019. They are also popular with recreational fishermen, especially for spearfishing.
