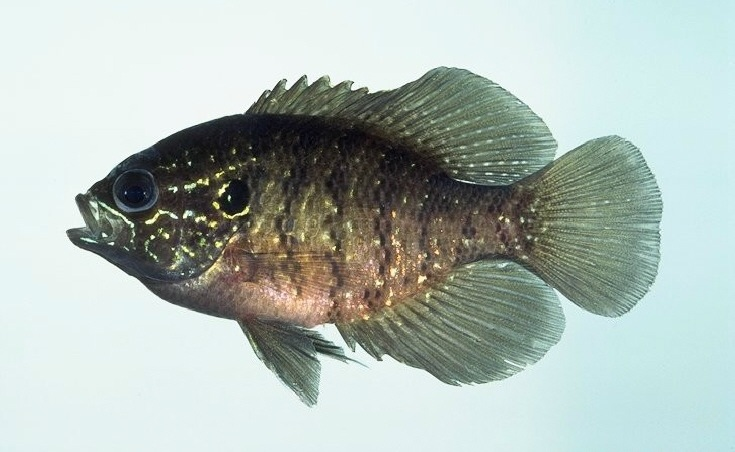
- Banded sunfish at the New England Aquarium

Conservation status
- Least Concern (IUCN 3.1)

Scientific classification
- Kingdom: Animalia
- Phylum: Chordata
- Class: Actinopterygii
- Order: Centrarchiformes
- Family: Centrarchidae
- Genus: Enneacanthus
- Species: E. obesus

Binomial name
- Enneacanthus obesus (Girard, 1854)

Synonyms
- Pomotis obesus Girard, 1854

= Banded sunfish =

Species of fish

The banded sunfish (Enneacanthus obesus) is a freshwater fish of the family, Centrarchidae. They can grow to 2–3 inches long. They are native to North America.

== Description ==
The banded sunfish is similar to the blackbanded sunfish and has a very compressed and deep body. Its sides are iridescent and dark colored. There are dark bands on its side and nuptial males and females will develop blue specks on their bodies. Its mouth is upturned and its pectoral and tail fins are rounded. It grows to an approximate length of 9.5 cm.

== Distribution ==
The banded sunfish is found in the Atlantic coastal drainages of North America from southern Maine south to central Florida and along the Gulf slope as far west as the Perdido River drainage in Alabama.

== Habitat ==
The banded sunfish is found in small ponds and backwaters of creeks to small and large rivers and boggy brooks over sand or mud in sluggish, acidic, heavily vegetated waters.

== Diet ==
The banded sunfish feeds upon aquatic insects and microcrustaceans.

== Reproduction ==
Spawning occurs from April through July. They can spawn when they become one year old. The male will construct a sand or gravel nest where the eggs are laid but does guard the eggs as the eggs are buoyant and float way from the nest.

== Status ==
The banded sunfish is currently endangered in Pennsylvania, New York, New Jersey, New Hampshire, and Connecticut. Globally, however, its population is stable and is listed as Least Concern on the IUCN Red List.

== Taxonomy and etymology ==
The banded sunfish was first formally described as Pomotis obesus in 1854 by the French ichthyologist Charles Frédéric Girard (1822-1895) with the type locality given as Framingham and in a branch of the Charles River, at Holliston, Massachusetts. The generic name Enneacanthus means "nine-spined" while the specific name obesus means "fat".
