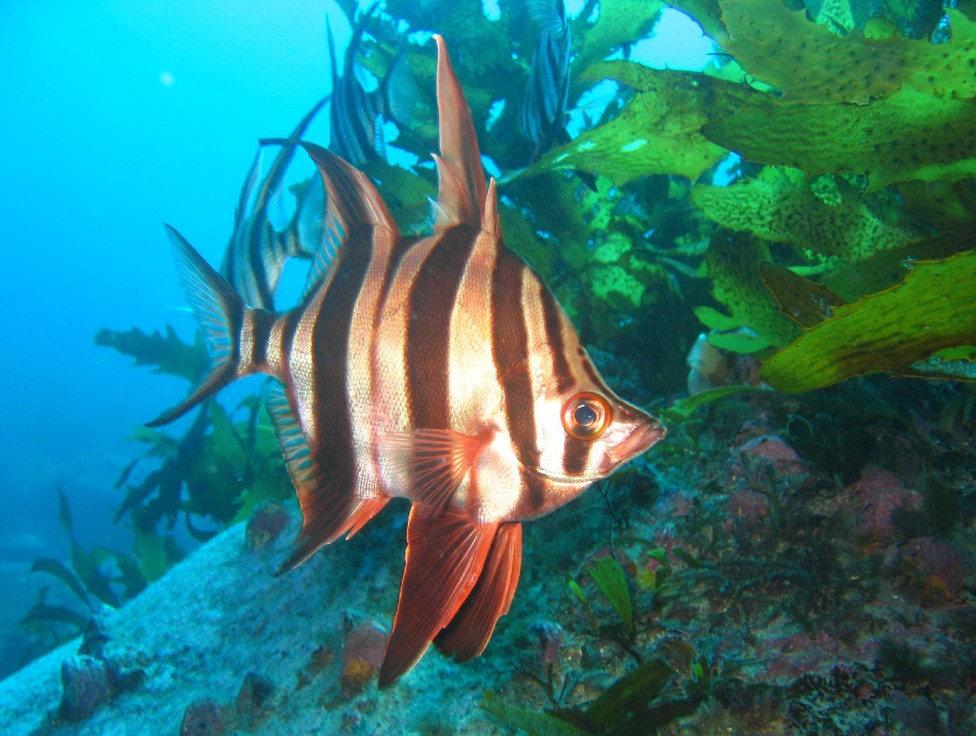
- At New South Wales

Conservation status
- Least Concern (IUCN 3.1)

Scientific classification
- Kingdom: Animalia
- Phylum: Chordata
- Class: Actinopterygii
- Division: Teleostei
- Order: Centrarchiformes
- Suborder: Centrarchoidei
- Family: Enoplosidae; T. N. Gill, 1893
- Genus: Enoplosus; Lacépède, 1802
- Species: E. armatus

Binomial name
- Enoplosus armatus (J. White, 1790)

Synonyms
- Chaetodon armatus J. White, 1790

= Old wife =

Enoplosus armatus

Species of ray-finned fish

Enoplosus armatus, commonly referred to as the old wife (plural: old wives), is a species of centrarchiform ray-finned fish endemic to the temperate coastal waters of Australia. It is the only genus and species in the family Enoplosidae.

== Taxonomy ==
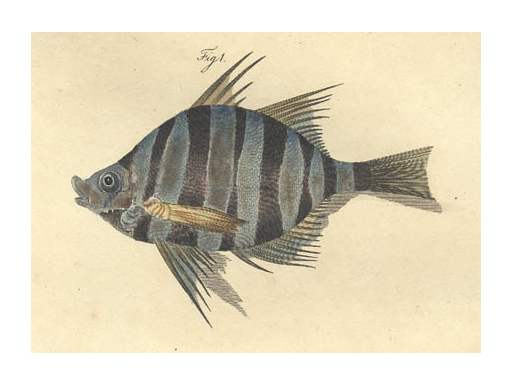
Illustration accompanying the original 1790 description of Chaetodon (now Enoplosus) armatus in John White's voyage journal. Attributed to convict artist Thomas Watling.

The old wife was originally classified in the genus Chaetodon (with the typical butterflyfishes), but it is now classified as the sole modern species of its own family Enoplosidae and genus Enoplosus. Some fossils have also been added to the genus.

The first description of the species, one of the earliest for any Australian fish, was in 1790 by John White in his Journal of a Voyage to New South Wales though some sources give George Shaw (who assisted White in the preparation of his manuscript) as the species authority. White originally named it the long-spined chaetodon (Chætodon armatus) and described it as follows:

Whitish Chaetodon, with seven black stripes on the body. Six spines on the dorsal fin, the third very long. This appears to be a new and very elegant species of the genus Chaetodon. The total length of the specimen was not more than four inches. The colour a silvery white, darker, and of a bluish tinge on the back; the transverse fasciae, or bands, of a deep black; the fins and tail of a pale brown. The third ray or spine of the first dorsal fin is much longer than the rest.

The species was reclassified by Lacépède into its own genus (named from "weapon" in Greek to again reflect the long spines), and was moved by Cuvier from Chaetodontidae into its own separate family within Percoidei.

In 1836, Agassiz identified closely related fossils at Monte Bolca (an important fossil site in Europe) as Enoplosus pygopterus (named for its smaller fins). These exceptionally well-preserved fossils had a very similar body plan, and even a similar zebra pattern of colouring. However, more recent studies have recovered this species as actually being an early cardinalfish, moved to its own genus, Eosphaeramia.

== Etymology ==
The name "old wife" refers to the sound it makes when caught, caused by it grinding its teeth. Other vernacular names have included "bastard dory", "zebra-fish" (also used for Girella zebra), and "double scalare".

== Description ==
It has a deep and compressed body and concave forehead. These features are characteristic of typical butterflyfishes. However, the old wife is easily distinguished by its silver-and-black, vertical, zebra-striped coloration, and by its two prominent dorsal fins. The second dorsal fin is very long and sickle-shaped. The fish grows up to 50 cm long.

Its dorsal fins have bony, knife-like spines. These have no obvious venom groove nor gland. Nonetheless, the spines are widely considered to inflict a painful venom.

In captivity

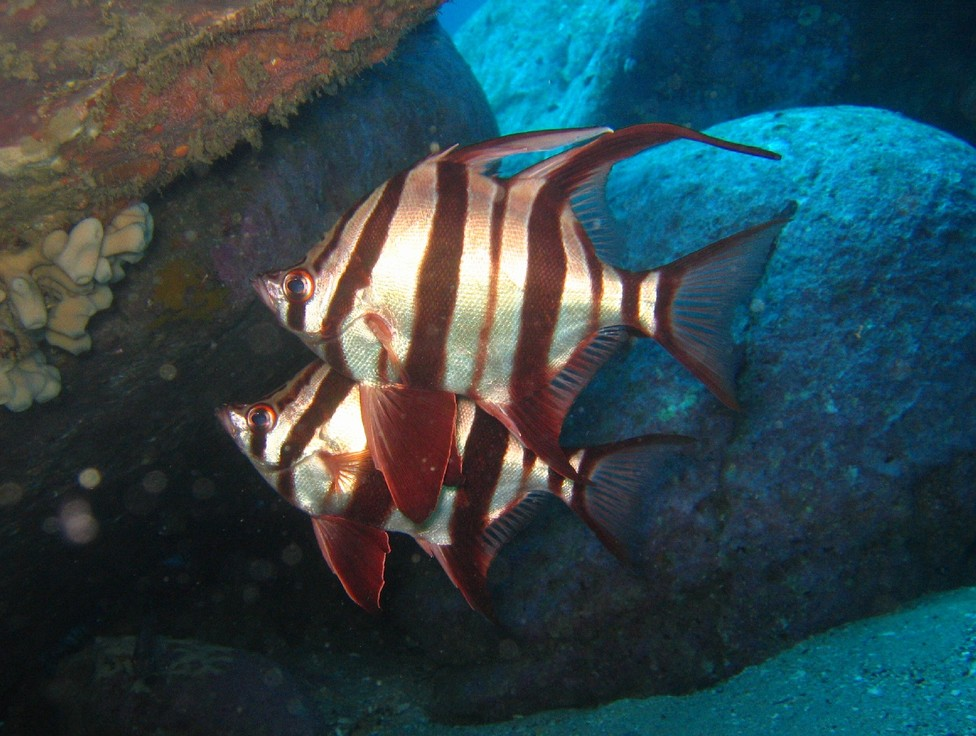
Old wives are commonly found in pairs or large schools.

Schooling, in New South Wales
