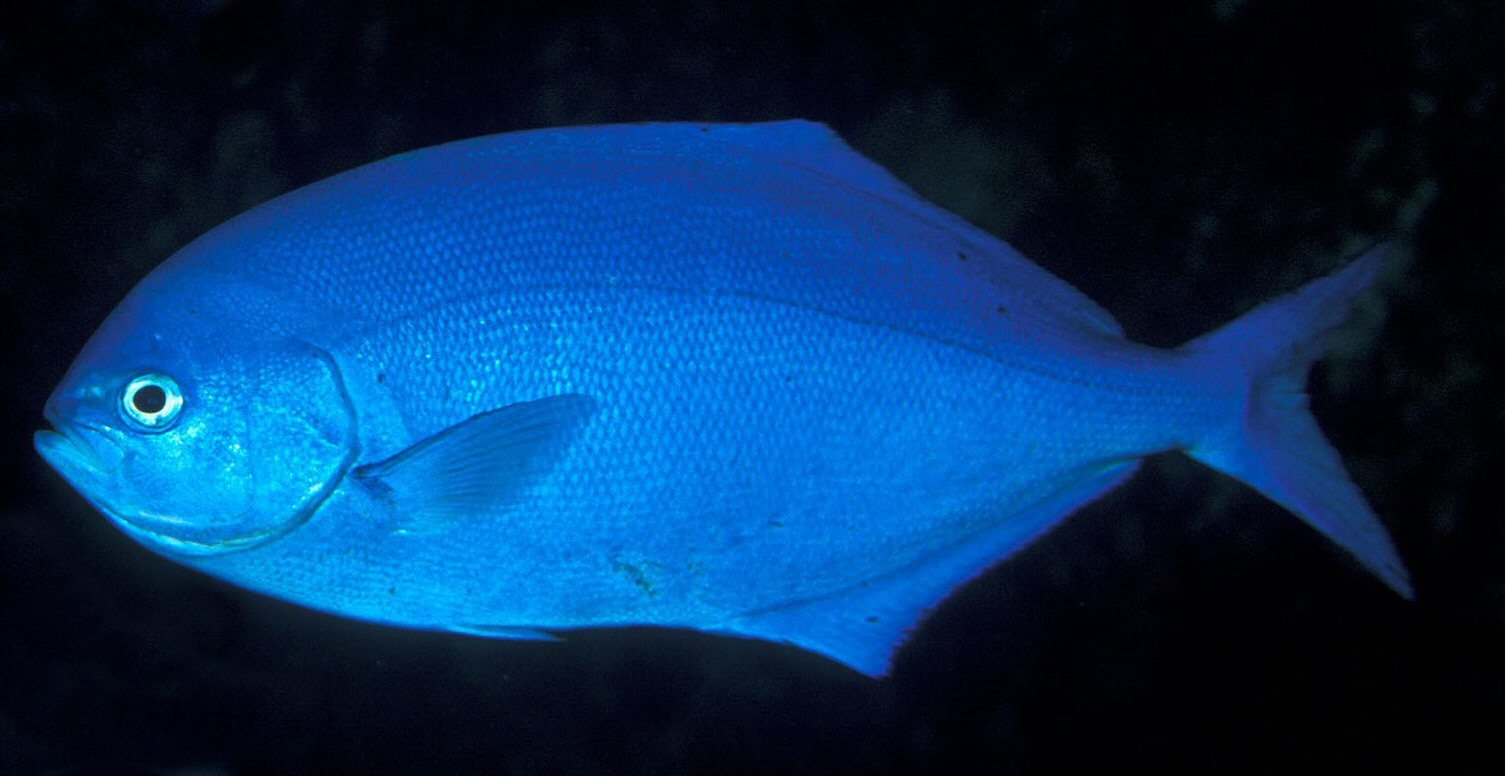
- Violet sweep (S. violacea)

Scientific classification
- Kingdom: Animalia
- Phylum: Chordata
- Class: Actinopterygii
- Division: Teleostei
- Order: Centrarchiformes
- Family: Scorpididae
- Genus: Scorpis; Valenciennes, 1832

Type species
- Scorpis georgianus Valenciennes, 1832

Synonyms
- Agenor Castelnau, 1879; Juvenella Whitley, 1948; Neptotichthys F. W. Hutton, 1890

= Scorpis =

Genus of ray-finned fishes

Scorpis is a genus of marine ray-finned fish from the family Scorpididae which are native to the eastern Indian Ocean and the Pacific Ocean. They are commonly referred to as sweeps.

== Species ==
The currently recognized species in this genus are:

Species	Common name	Image
Scorpis aequipinnis J. Richardson, 1848	sea sweep	
Scorpis chilensis Guichenot, 1848		
Scorpis georgiana Valenciennes, 1832	banded sweep	
Scorpis lineolata Kner, 1865	silver sweep	
Scorpis violacea (F. W. Hutton, 1873)	violet sweep	
