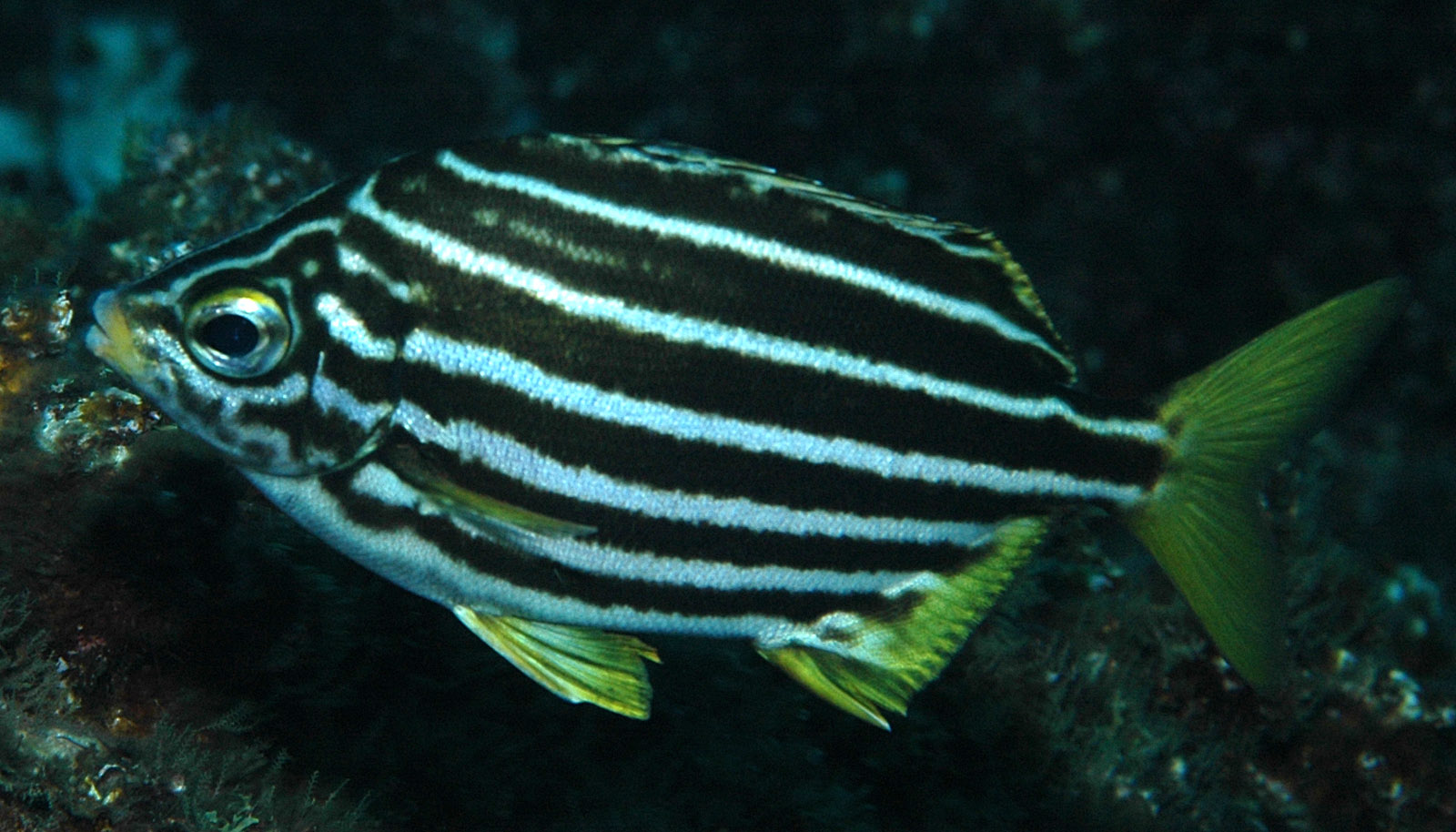

Scientific classification
- Kingdom: Animalia
- Phylum: Chordata
- Class: Actinopterygii
- Order: Centrarchiformes
- Family: Microcanthidae
- Genus: Atypichthys
- Species: A. latus

Binomial name
- Atypichthys latus McCulloch & Waite, 1916

= Mado (fish) =

Species of ray-finned fish

The mado (Atypichthys latus), in New Zealand, or stripy or eastern footballer in Australia, is a species of ray-finned fish found in inshore waters around southern Australia and the north eastern coast of the North Island of New Zealand to depths of about 60 m (200 ft), off headlands and offshore islands. This species can reach a length of 30 cm (12 in), though most do not exceed 20 cm (7.9 in). This species can also be found in the aquarium trade.
