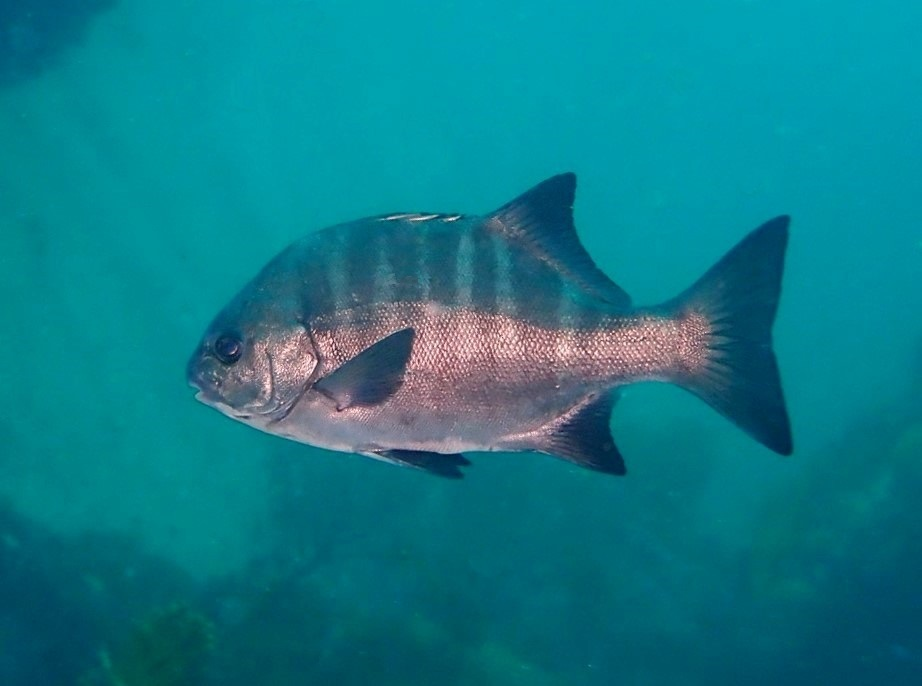
- Galjoen (D. capensis)
- Banded galjoen (D. multifasciatus)

Scientific classification
- Kingdom: Animalia
- Phylum: Chordata
- Class: Actinopterygii
- Division: Teleostei
- Order: Centrarchiformes
- Suborder: Terapontoidei
- Family: Dichistiidae; J. L. B. Smith, 1935
- Genus: Dichistius; T. N. Gill, 1888

Type species
- Dipterodon capensis G. Cuvier, 1831

= Dichistius =

Genus of ray-finned fishes

Dichistius is a genus of centrarchiform ray-finned fishes, the galjoen fishes, native to the Atlantic coast of southern Africa (D. capensis) and the Indian Ocean coast of southern Africa (D. multifasciatus). Growing to lengths of 80 cm (31 in) (D. capensis) and 35 cm (14 in) (D. multifasciatus), both known species are popular commercial and game fishes.

== Species ==
The currently recognized species in this genus are:

- Dichistius capensis (G. Cuvier, 1831) (galjoen)
- Dichistius multifasciatus (Pellegrin, 1914) (banded galjoen)

== See also ==
- List of fish families
