= Parascorpis =

- In South Africa

Scientific classification
- Kingdom: Animalia
- Phylum: Chordata
- Class: Actinopterygii
- Division: Teleostei
- Order: Centrarchiformes
- Suborder: Centrarchoidei
- Family: Parascorpididae; J. L. B. Smith, 1949
- Genus: Parascorpis; Bleeker, 1875
- Species: P. typus

Binomial name
- Parascorpis typus Bleeker, 1875

Synonyms
- (Genus): Atyposoma Boulenger, 1899; (Species): Atyposoma gurneyi Boulenger, 1899

Species of ray-finned fish

Parascorpis typus, commonly known as the jutjaw, is a species of centrarchiform fish, the only known member of its genus and family. It is native to the Indian Ocean coast of Africa where it is known to occur along the coasts of Mozambique and South Africa. It is found at depths of from 20 to 200 metres (66 to 656 ft). This species grows to a length of 60 centimetres (24 in) TL. This species is considered to be a good foodfish, but they are currently not sought out by commercial fisheries and are caught only rarely by anglers.
