= Here Then =

- Simplified Chinese: 此处与彼处
- Directed by: Mao Mao
- Release date: June 23, 2012 (Edinburgh)
- Running time: 86 minutes
- Country: China
- Language: Mandarin

Here Then (此处与彼处) is a 2012 Chinese film directed by Mao Mao (director) (茅毛). In Chinese the film's name is the same as Ici et Ailleurs. The film showed at the Edinburgh Film Festival.

The film stars Huangtang Yijia (黄唐一佳), Zhao Wei, Tian Qingyu (田青玉), Yue Ding (岳鼎), Wang Yizheng, Li Ziqian, Li Wensi, Cai Jiqiu, Yan Jianguo, Zhou Li.
