= Microcanthidae =

- Atypichthys latus and Microcanthus joyceae

Scientific classification
- Kingdom: Animalia
- Phylum: Chordata
- Class: Actinopterygii
- Division: Teleostei
- Order: Centrarchiformes
- Suborder: Terapontoidei
- Family: Microcanthidae; Bleeker, 1876

Genera
- see text

Subfamily of fishes

The Microcanthidae, commonly known as stripeys, footballers, mados, and moonlighters, are a family of marine ray-finned fish in the order Centrarchiformes.

== Taxonomy ==
In past classifications, such as the 5th edition of Fishes of the World, Microacanthinae was treated as a subfamily of the sea chub family Kyphosidae. but other authorities treat it as a family, the Microacanthidae. It has also been placed in the order Pempheriformes in some classifications, and in the Centrarchiformes in others.

== Classification ==
The following genera are classified in the family Microcanthidae:

- Atypichthys Günther, 1862
- Microcanthus Swainson, 1839
- Neatypus Waite, 1905
- Tilodon Thominot, 1881

== Characteristics ==
Neatypus obliquus

Tilodon sexfasciatus

The Microcathidae is a family of moderately sized fishes, most of which grow no longer than 25 centimetres (9.8 in). They have an oval body. They have a small terminal mouth which does not extend as far as the front of the eye. They have small teeth which are set close together and have pointed tips, and are set out either in a broad band or a single row. There is one dorsal fin which has 11 or 12 spines and 16-18 soft rays while the anal fin has three spines and 16-19 soft rays. The pelvic fins start just behind the end of the base of the pectoral fin. Their caudal fins vary from emarginate through to forked. They have small ctenoid scales which reach onto the cheeks and upper part of gill covers, and form scaly sheaths at the bases of the dorsal and anal fins, with scales extending on to the soft-rayed parts of those fins. They have a continuous lateral line which is evenly curved. They are normally yellowish or whitish in colour, marked with dark brown or blackish almost horizontal or oblique stripes.

== Habitat, biology and range ==
The species of the Microcanthidae are found off shallow coastal areas and in rocky estuaries, mainly over hard substrates. They occur from the intertidal zone down to depths of 30 metres (98 ft); their diet comprises small invertebrates and algae. They prefer subtropical and warm temperate seas, occurring in the southeast Indian Ocean, the southwestern Pacific Ocean off Australia and New Zealand, and around southern Japan, Taiwan and the Hawaiian islands.

== Fisheries ==
Microcanthids are of little interest to fisheries although they are of interest to the aquarium trade.
