= Terapontoidei =

- Terapon jarbua
- Kyphosus vaigiensis

Scientific classification
- Kingdom: Animalia
- Phylum: Chordata
- Class: Actinopterygii
- Division: Teleostei
- Order: Centrarchiformes
- Suborder: Terapontoidei

Families
- see text

Suborder of ray-finned fishes

Terapontoidei is a suborder of marine and freshwater fish in the order Centrarchiformes.

== Biology ==
Fishes of the suborder Terapontoidei are ecologically diverse, such as in terms of body shape, habitat preference and diet. They include both marine and freshwater species, and may be found in both temperate and tropical waters. Notably however, terapontoid species are unusual for convergently evolving herbivory many times within Terapontoidei, although omnivorous and carnivorous taxa are still present in the group.

== Families ==
- Girellidae Gill, 1862 (nibblers)
- Scorpididae Günther, 1860 (halfmoons)
- Kyphosidae Jordan, 1887 (sea chubs)
- Kuhliidae Jordan & Evermann, 1896 (flagtails)
- Terapontidae Richardson, 1842 (grunters)
- Dichistiidae Smith, 1935 (galjoens)
- Oplegnathidae Bleeker, 1853 (knifejaws)
- Caesioscorpididae Parenti & Randall, 2020 (blowhole perches)
- Microcanthidae Bleeker, 1876 (stripeys)
