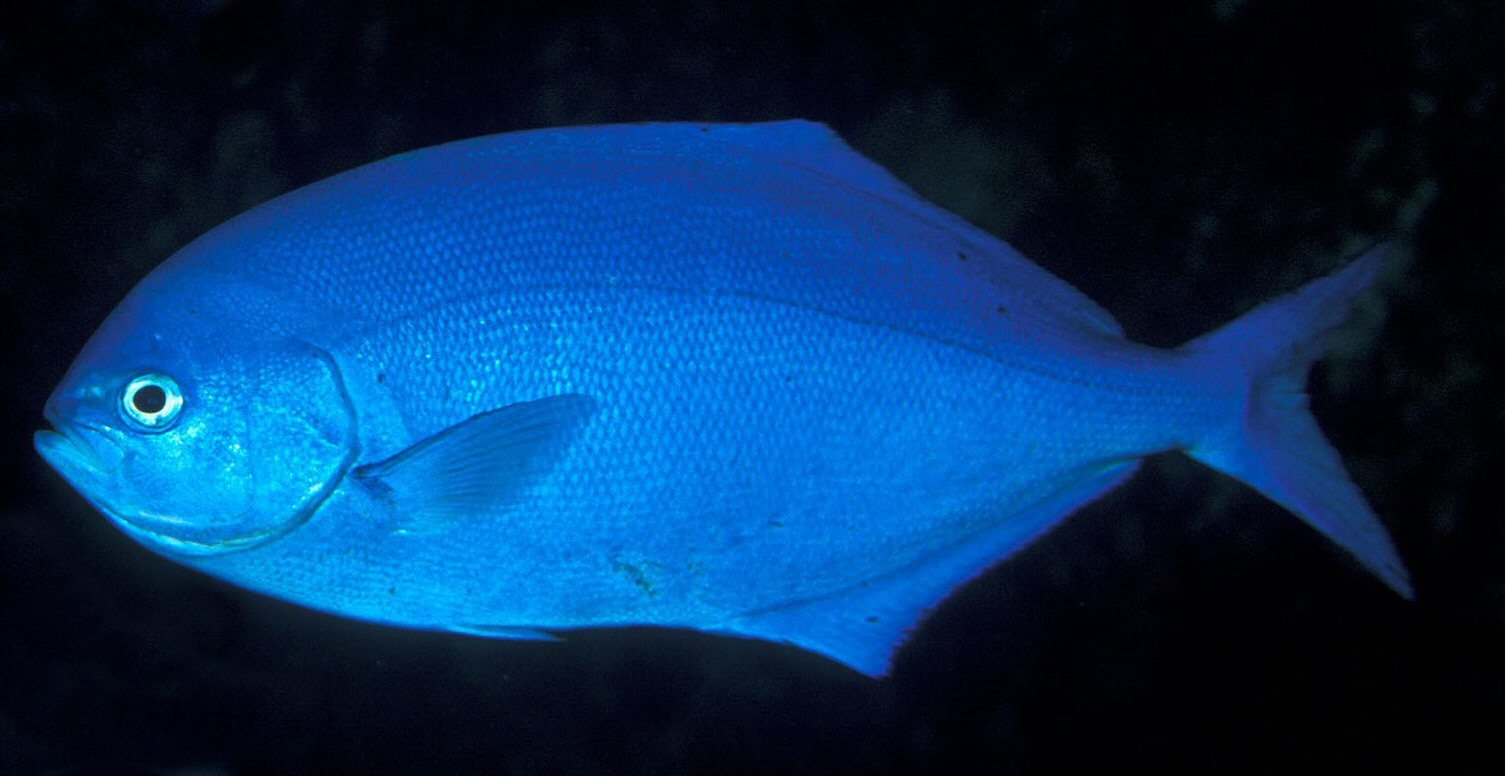
- The blue maomao, Scorpis violacea

Scientific classification
- Kingdom: Animalia
- Phylum: Chordata
- Class: Actinopterygii
- Order: Centrarchiformes
- Suborder: Terapontoidei
- Family: Scorpididae; Günther, 1860

Genera
- See text

= Scorpididae =

Subfamily of fishes

The Scorpididae, commonly known as halfmoons, knifefishes, and sweeps, are a family of marine centrarchiform fish in the suborder Terapontoidei. In the past, they were considered a subfamily of the Kyphosidae, but they are now treated as their own family.

They are distributed throughout the Pacific and east Indian Oceans, with species occurring in the waters of North America, South America, Asia, Australia, and numerous islands. Most inhabit the continental shelf in shallow rock and kelp reefs and deeper offshore reefs, whilst others are found well offshore in a pelagic setting. Most of the Scorpidinae are carnivorous, taking a variety of small crustaceans, although some are partly herbivorous. A number of the larger species are fished commercially and recreationally, and are considered good table fish.

== Classification ==
The following classification is based on Eschmeyer's Catalog of Fishes:

- Bathystethus Gill, 1893
- Labracoglossa Peters, 1866
- Medialuna Jordan & Fesler, 1893
- Scorpis Valenciennes, 1832

The 5th edition of Fishes of the World includes Neoscorpis within the subfamily Scorpidinae but Catalog of Fishes has moved it to Kyphosidae, as the only other genus within it.
