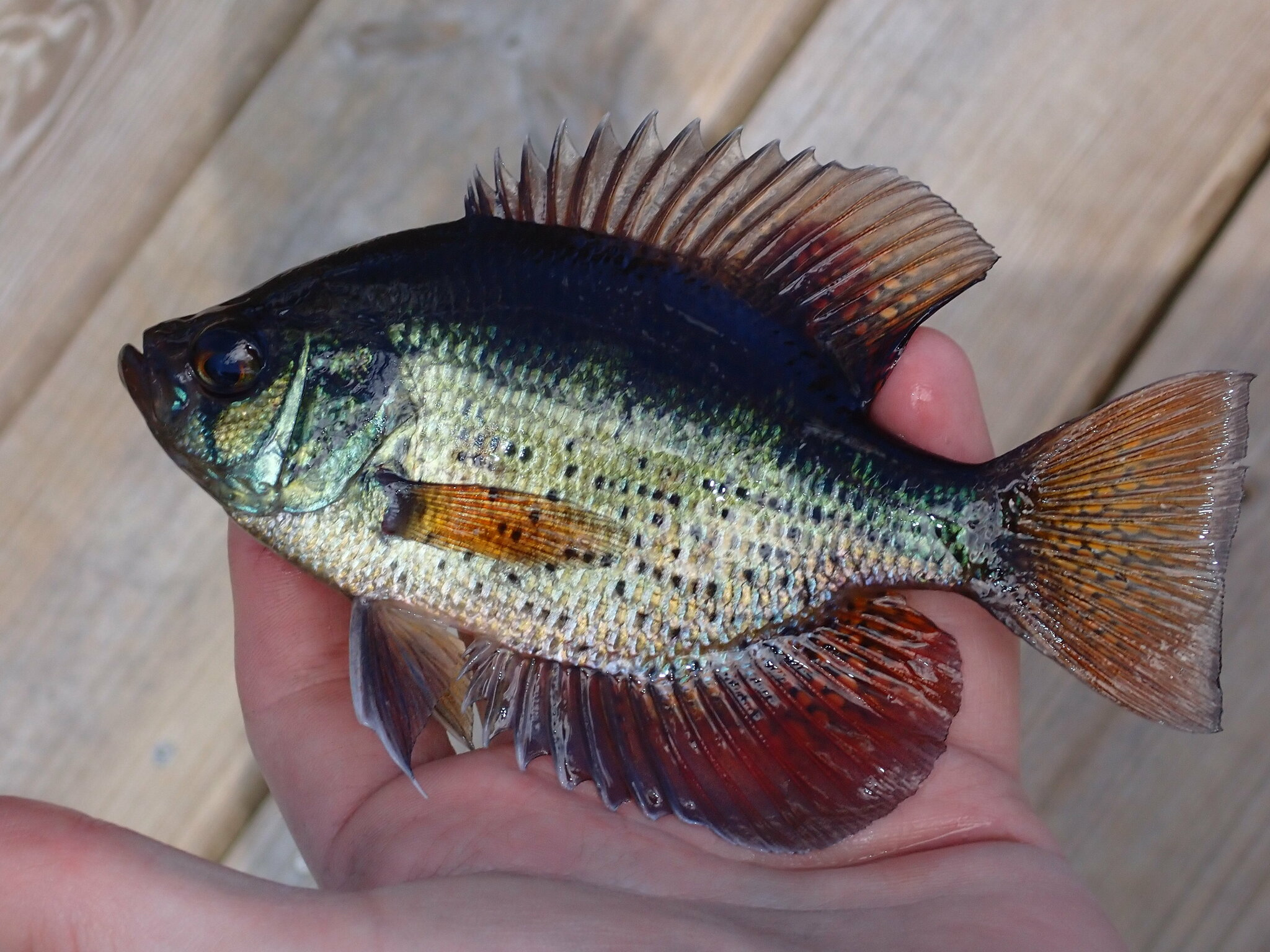

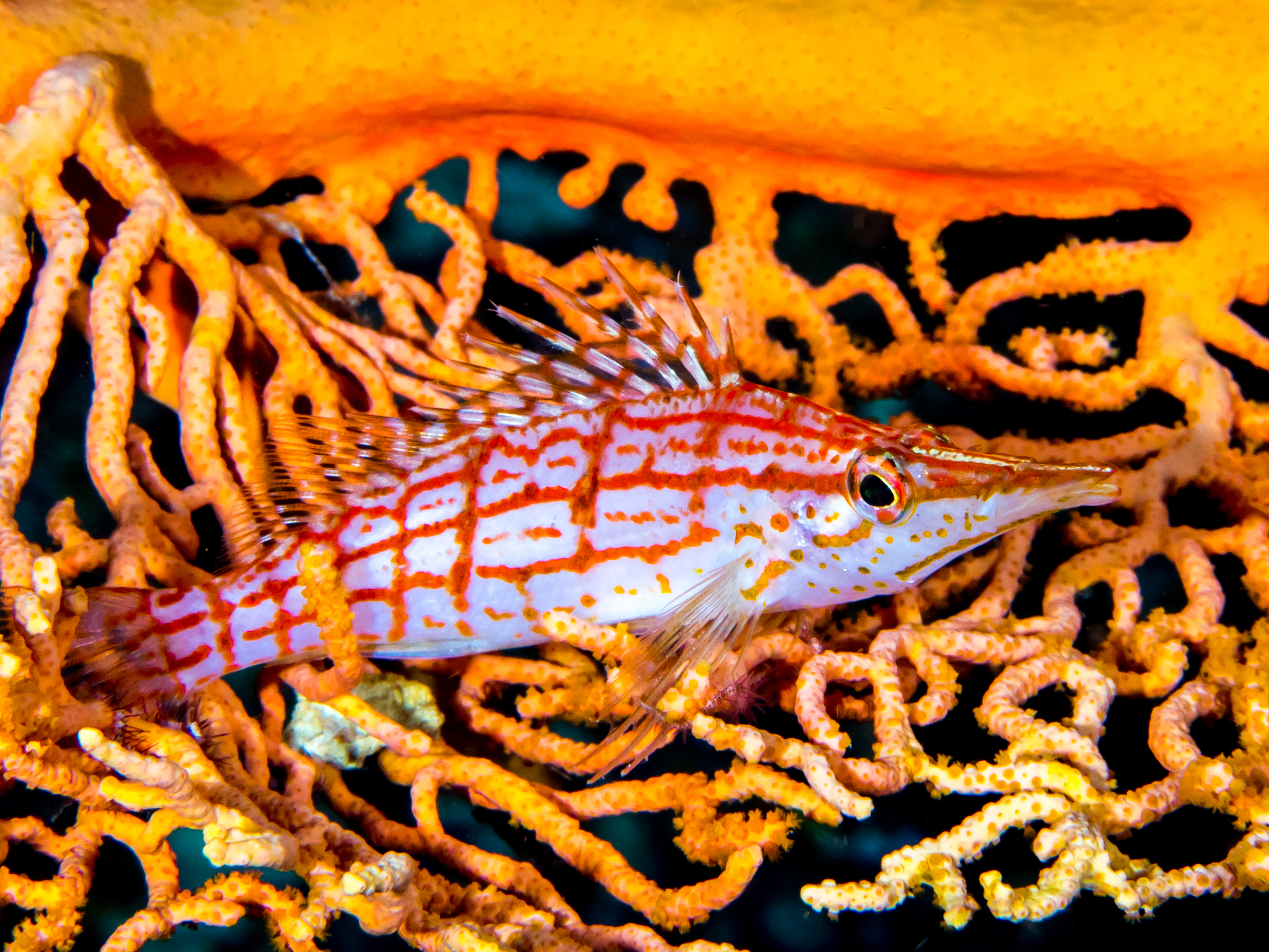
- Centrarchus macropterus (top), Oxycirrhites typus (bottom)

Scientific classification
- Kingdom: Animalia
- Phylum: Chordata
- Class: Actinopterygii
- Division: Teleostei
- Clade: Eupercaria
- Order: Centrarchiformes; Bleeker, 1859

Type species
- Centrarchus macropterus Lacépède, 1801

Families
- See text

= Centrarchiformes =

Centrarchiformes Temporal range: Early Paleocene–present

Order of ray-finned fishes

Centrarchiformes /sɛnˈtrɑːrkɪfɔːrmiːz/ is an order of ray-finned fish, previously included amongst the perciformes. The order Centrarchiformes is not recognized in the 5th Edition (2016) of Fishes of the World, but is accepted on the World Register of Marine Species in November 2023, Fishbase, and Eschmeyer's Catalog of Fishes.

Many centrarchiforms look essentially perch-like, featuring a stocky build and a spine-bearing dorsal fin, and range in size from 2.5 cm (0.98 in) in length (for Elassoma gilberti), to 1.8 m (5.9 ft) for the Maccullochella peelii.

The earliest fossils of this group are of Percichthys from the Early Paleocene of Bolivia, although this status is tentative. If these remains are not of a percichthyid, then the earliest known centrarchiform fossils are of oplegnathids from the Early Eocene of Antarctica. Phylogenetic inferences suggest that this order diverged from its closest relative, the Labriformes, during the Late Cretaceous, about 83 million years ago.

Centrarchiformes are widespread worldwide, being found in all temperate and tropical nearshore marine habitats, with freshwater radiations also present on several different continents. The largest family-level diversity within the group is found in the Southern Hemisphere, with many families endemic to the coast of Australia. However, the two most speciose groups of the order are found in freshwater, and are widely separated: freshwater members of the Terapontidae are found in Australasia and nearby regions, while the freshwater sunfish (including the iconic largemouth bass) are found throughout North America.

== Taxonomy ==
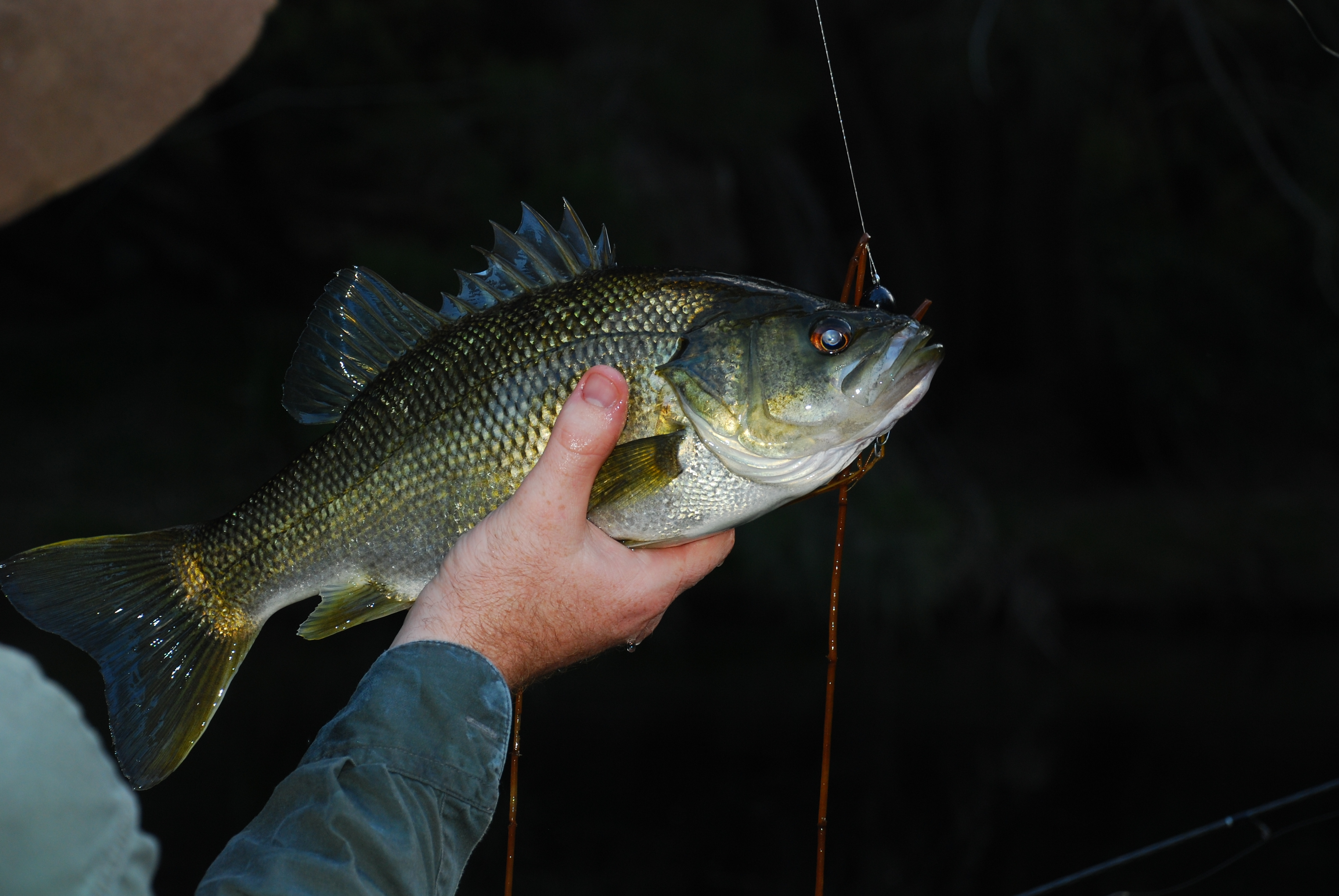
Percalates is the most basal genus of the order.

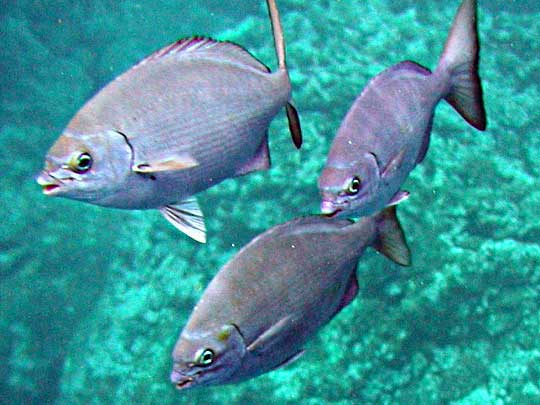
Kyphosus is common in tropical marine habitats.

Centrarchiformes includes the following subgroups:

- Percalatoidei
  - Percalates Ramsay & Ogilby, 1887 (Australian basses)
- Terapontoidei
  - Girellidae Gill, 1862 (nibblers)
  - Scorpididae Günther, 1860 (halfmoons)
  - Kyphosidae Jordan, 1887 (sea chubs)
  - Kuhliidae Jordan & Evermann, 1896 (flagtails)
  - Terapontidae Richardson, 1842 (grunters)
  - Dichistiidae Smith, 1935 (galjoens)
  - Oplegnathidae Bleeker, 1853 (knifejaws)
  - Caesioscorpididae Parenti & Randall, 2020 (blowhole perches)
  - Microcanthidae Bleeker, 1876 (stripeys)
- Centrarchoidei
  - Centrarchidae Bleeker, 1859 (North American sunfishes & basses)
  - Elassomatidae Jordan, 1877 (pygmy sunfishes)
  - Sinipercidae Jordan & Richardson, 1910 (Chinese perches)
  - Enoplosidae Gill, 1893 (oldwives)
  - Percichthyidae Jordan & C. H. Eigenmann, 1890 (temperate perches)
  - Perciliidae Jordan, 1923 (southern basses)
  - Parascorpididae Smith, 1949 (jutjaws)
- Cirrhitoidei
  - Cirrhitidae Macleay, 1841 (hawkfishes)
  - Chironemidae Gill, 1862 (kelpfishes)
  - Aplodactylidae Günther, 1859 (marblefishes)
  - Cheilodactylidae Bonaparte, 1850 (fingerfins)
  - Latridae Gill, 1862 (trumpeters)

Cladogram from Near & Thacker, 2024:

- Centrarchiformes
  - Percalates (estuary perches)
  - - - - Girellidae (nibblers)
        - Scorpididae (halfmoons)
      - - - Kyphosidae (sea chubs)
          - - Kuhlia (flagtails)
            - Terapontidae (grunters)
        - - Dichistius (galjoen fishes)
          - - Oplegnathus (knifejaws)
            - - Caesioscorpis theagenes (blowhole perch)
              - Microcanthidae (stripeys)
    - - - - Centrarchidae (sunfishes and blackbasses)
          - Sinipercidae (oriental perches)
        - - Enoplosus armatus (old wife)
          - - Parascorpis typus (jutjaw)
            - Percichthyidae (temperate perches)
      - - Cirrhitidae (hawkfishes)
        - - Latridae (trumpeters and morwongs)
          - - Chironemus (kelpfishes)
            - - Aplodactylus (marblefishes)
              - Cheilodactylus (fingerfishes)

== Gallery ==
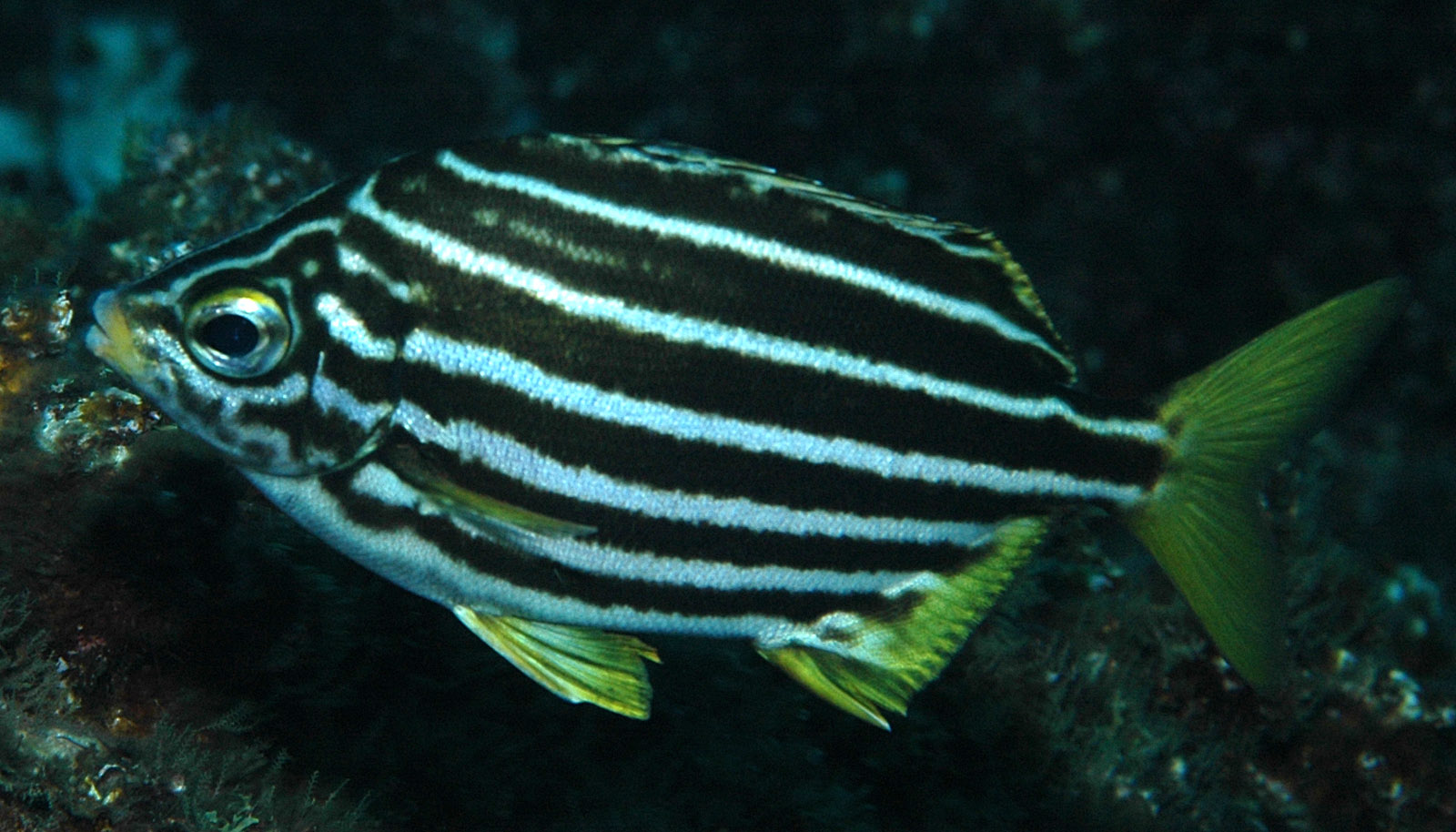
Atypichthys latus

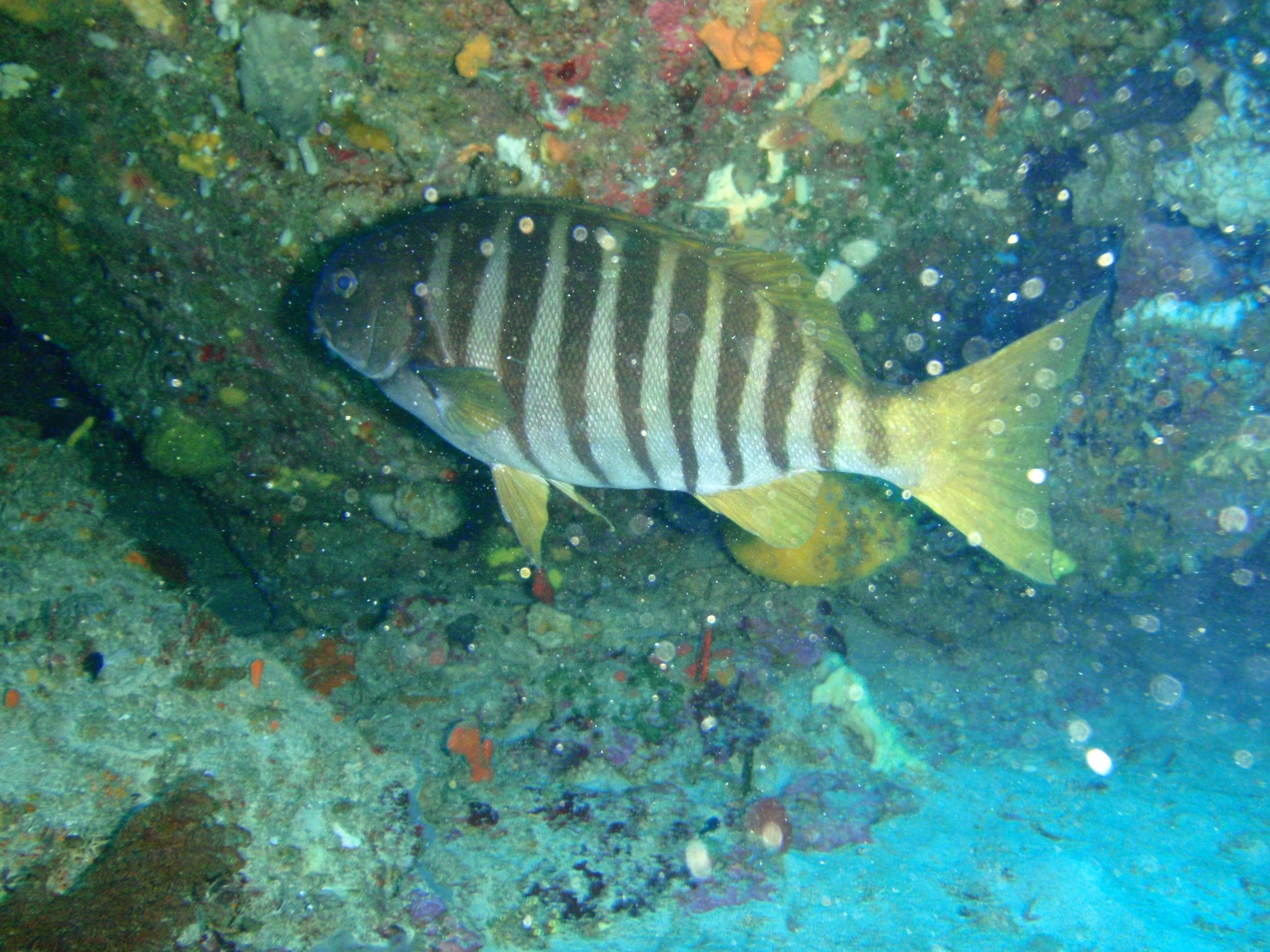
Girella zebra

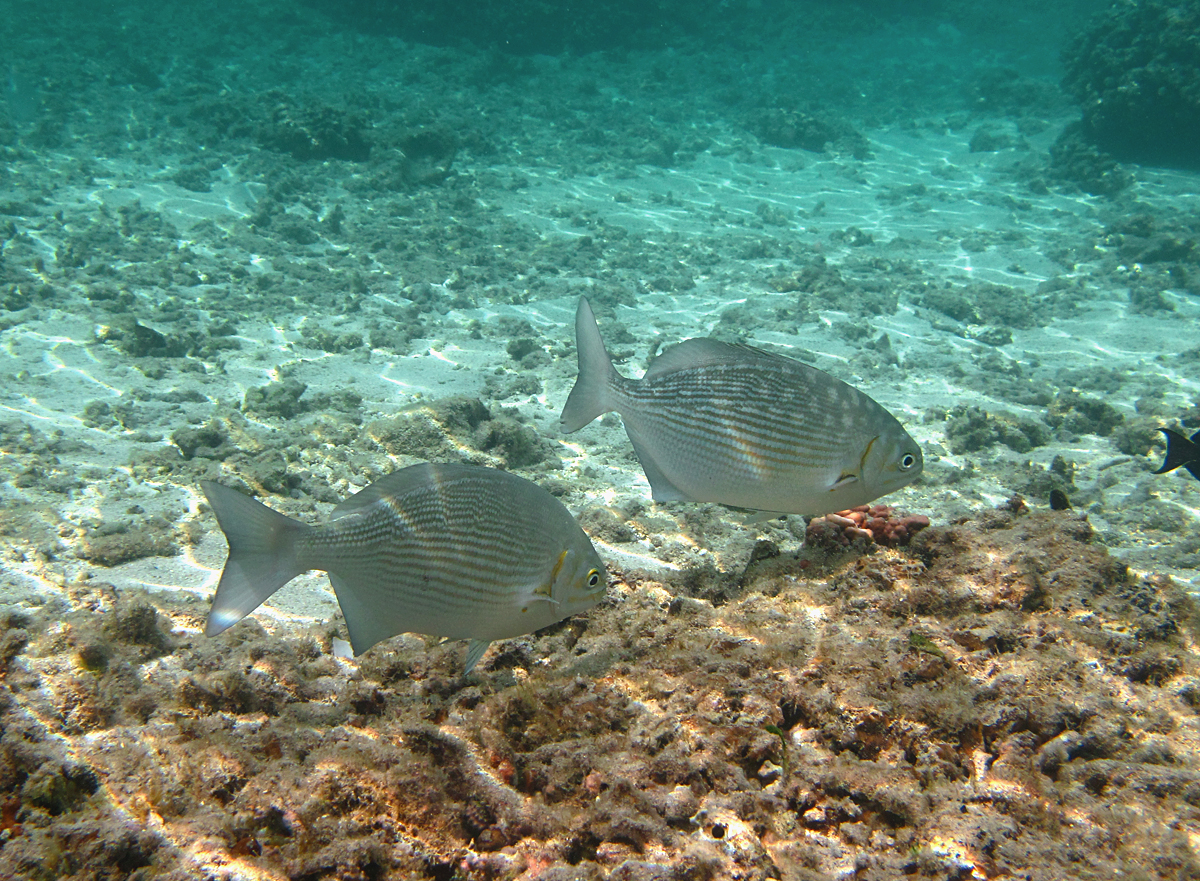
Kyphosus cinerascens

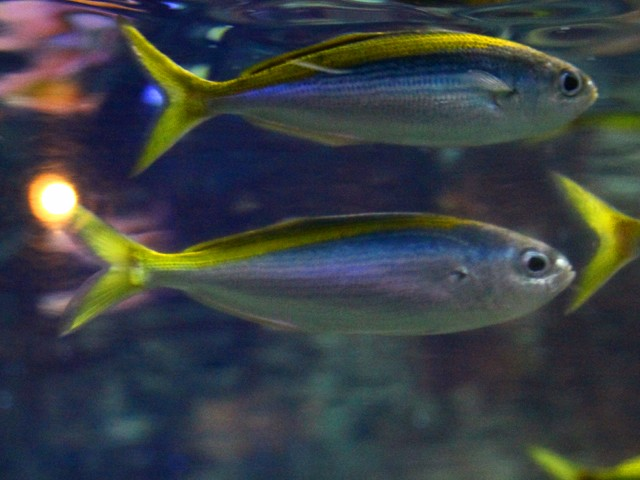
Labracoglossa argenteiventris

Stripey (Microcanthus strigatus)

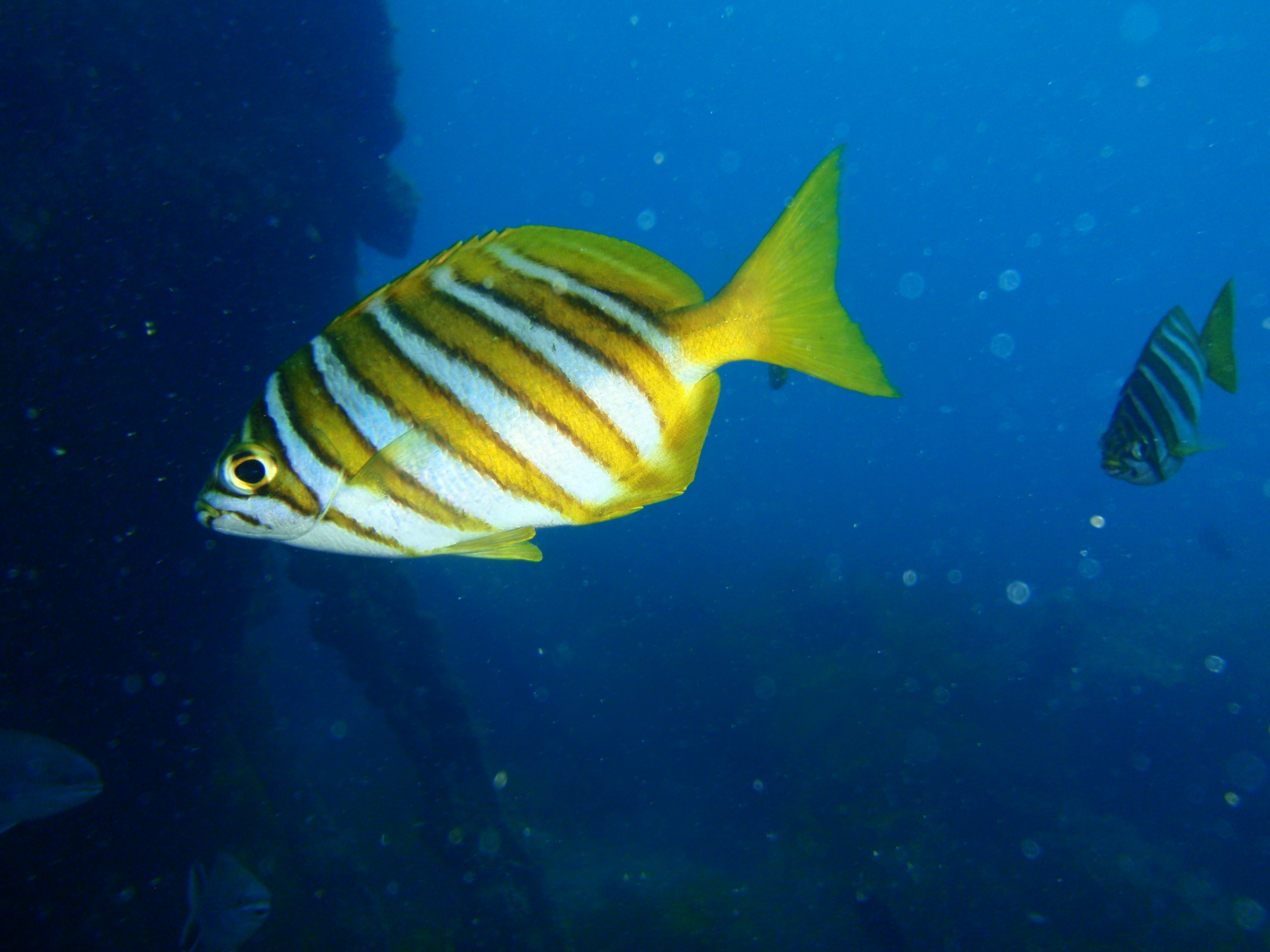
Western footballer (Neatypus obliquus)

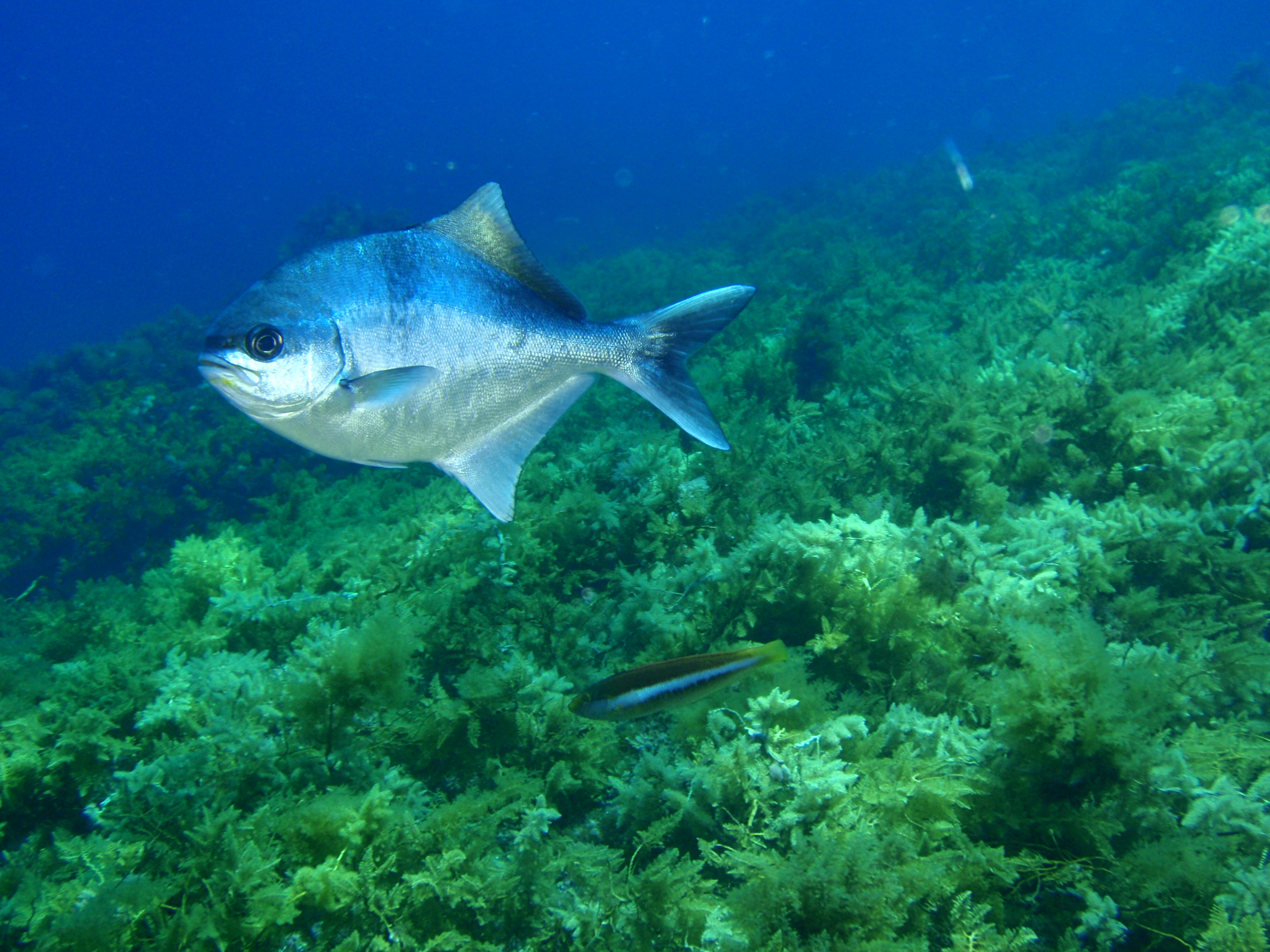
Scorpis aequipinnis

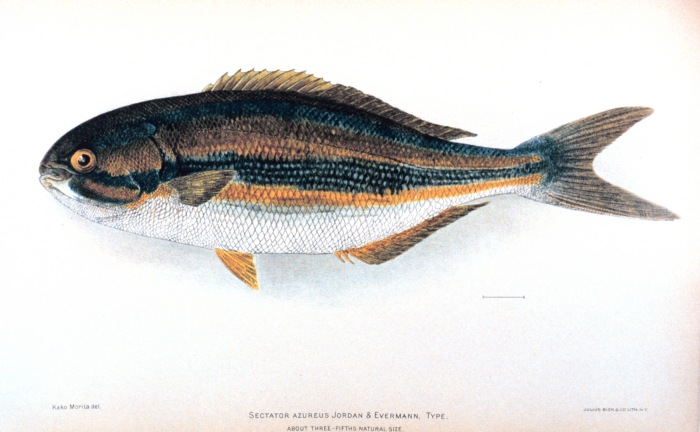
Kyphosus ocyurus

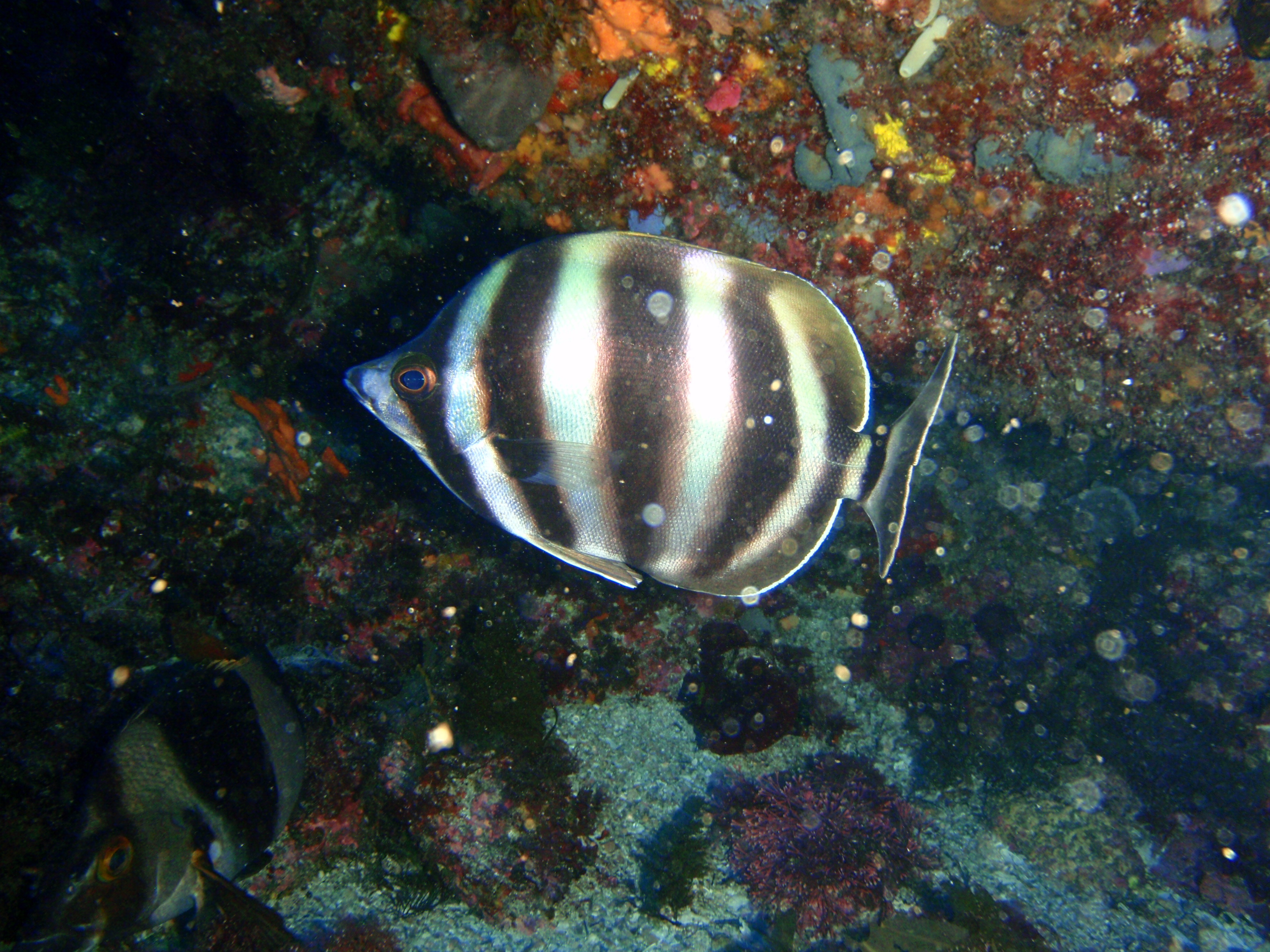
Moonlighter (Tilodon sexfasciatus)
