= Melbourne Zoo =

Zoo in Melbourne, Victoria, Australia

Royal Melbourne Zoological Gardens

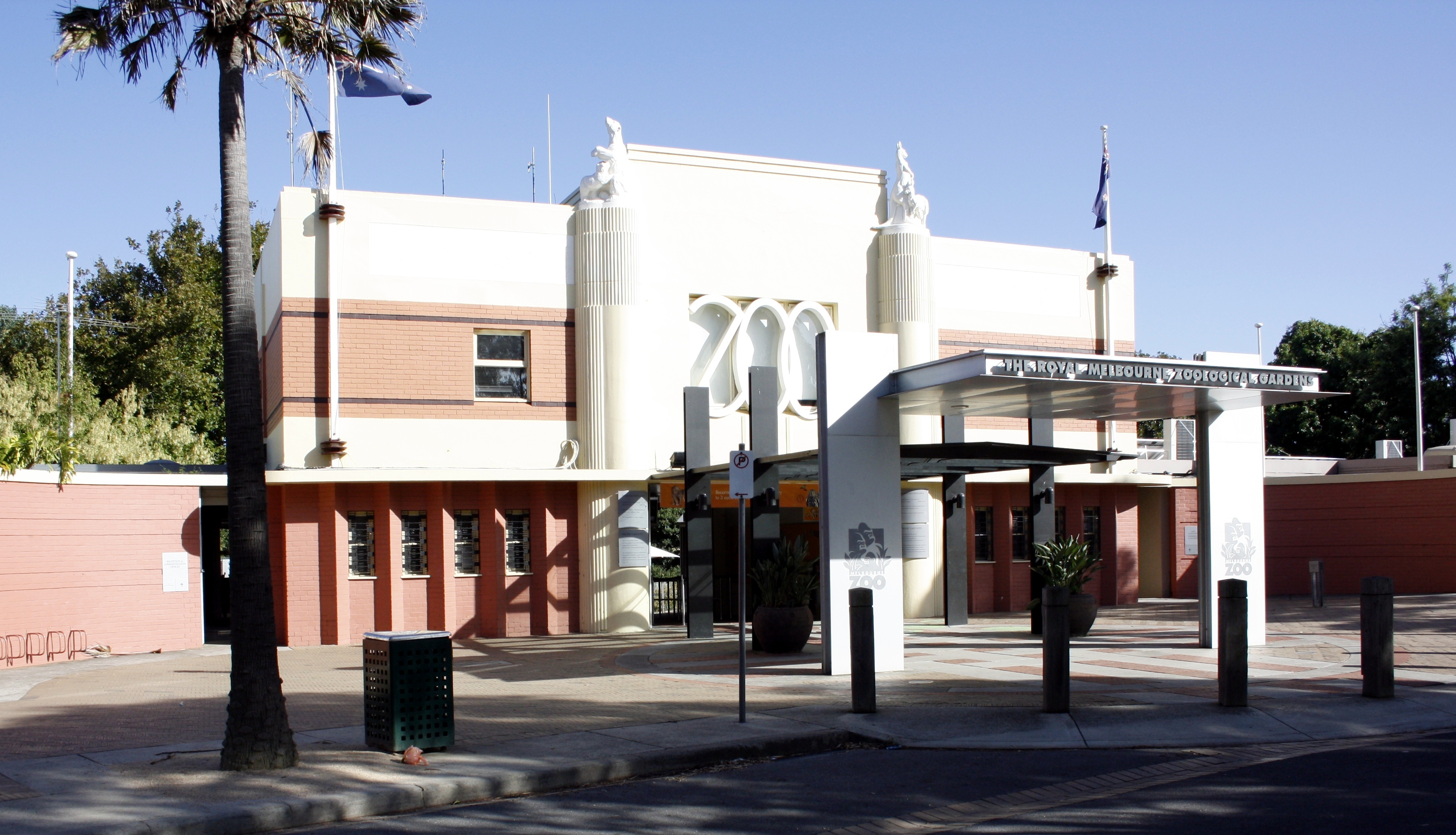
- Main Entrance
- Interactive map of Royal Melbourne Zoological Gardens
- 37.784762°S 144.952095°E
- Date opened: 6 October 1862; 164 years ago
- Location: Parkville, Melbourne, Victoria, Australia
- Land area: 55 acres (22 ha)
- No. of animals: 5,120
- No. of species: 250
- Memberships: Zoo and Aquarium Association, World Association of Zoos and Aquariums
- Major exhibits: lions, tigers, snow leopards, orang-utans, gorillas, gibbons, baboons, lemurs, pygmy hippopotamus, giraffes, marsupials, platypus, birds, reptiles
- Public transit: Royal Park Melbourne Zoo/Royal Park (#26): 58 Bus route 505
- Website: www.zoo.org.au/Melbourne

Victorian Heritage Register
- Official name: Royal Melbourne Zoological Gardens
- Type: State Registered Place
- Criteria: a, e, f, g, h
- Designated: 23 May 1996
- Reference no.: H1074
- Heritage Overlay numbers: HO364 HO822 HO823 HO824 HO830 HO831 HO826 HO825 HO828 HO829 HO827

Melbourne Zoo is a zoo in Melbourne, Australia. It is located within Royal Park in Parkville, approximately 4 kilometres (2.5 mi) north of the centre of Melbourne. It is the primary zoo serving Melbourne. As of 2021, the zoo contains 3742 animals comprising 243 species, from Australia and around the world. The zoo is accessible via Royal Park station on the Upfield railway line, and is also accessible via tram routes 58 and 19, as well as by bicycle on the Capital City Trail. Bicycles are not allowed inside the zoo itself.

The Royal Melbourne Zoological Gardens is a full institutional member of the Zoo and Aquarium Association and the World Association of Zoos and Aquariums.

The zoo is set among flower gardens and picnic areas. Many of the animals are now organised in bioclimatic zones: African rainforest ('Gorilla Rainforest') that include gorillas and lemurs; Asian rainforest that includes orangutans, tigers and otters; and the Australian bush with kangaroos, koalas, wombats, goannas, native birds and many others. Popular exhibits also include the 'Butterfly House', the 'Reptile House', the 'Great Flight Aviary', 'Wild Sea', 'Treetop Apes and Monkeys' and 'Lion Gorge'. During the summer months they also hold sleep over events at the zoo that allows people to purchase tickets to "camp out" for a night under the stars.

The zoo includes a large schools section and caters to many school visitors annually. Its education program encourages students to conserve animals.

Visitors can see historical cages including the heritage listed Elephant House, which has been renovated and adapted for use for customers paying to sleep overnight in tents at the zoo in popular Roar and Snore evenings. These evenings allow the public to see some of the nocturnal animals at the zoo in evening guided tours by experienced camp hosts.

== History ==
In October 1857, the Zoological Society of Victoria was formed with the aim of introducing animals and plants from overseas. Its first collections of animals were housed in Richmond Paddock. In 1861 the organisation changed its name to the "Acclimatisation Society of Victoria".

On 6 October 1862, the organisation opened a new Melbourne Zoo in Royal Park on 55-acre (22 ha) of land donated by the City of Melbourne. Melbourne Zoo was modelled on London Zoo.

Initially the zoo was important for the acclimatisation of domestic animals recovering from their long trip to Australia. It was only with the appointment of Albert Alexander Cochrane Le Souef in 1870 that more exotic animals were procured for public display, and the gardens and picnic areas were developed. 1870 also saw the society change its name to the "Zoological and Acclimatisation Society of Victoria", and was granted the prefix "Royal" in 1910.

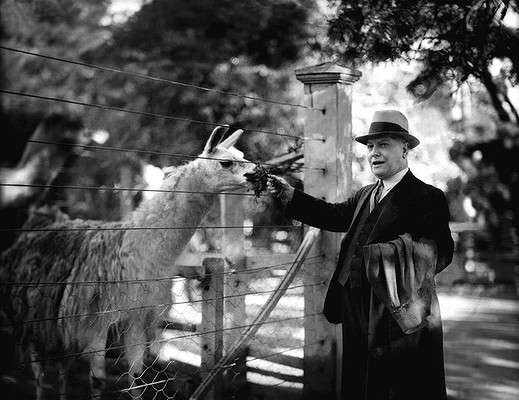
The President of the Zoological Board, feeding a llama, 1937

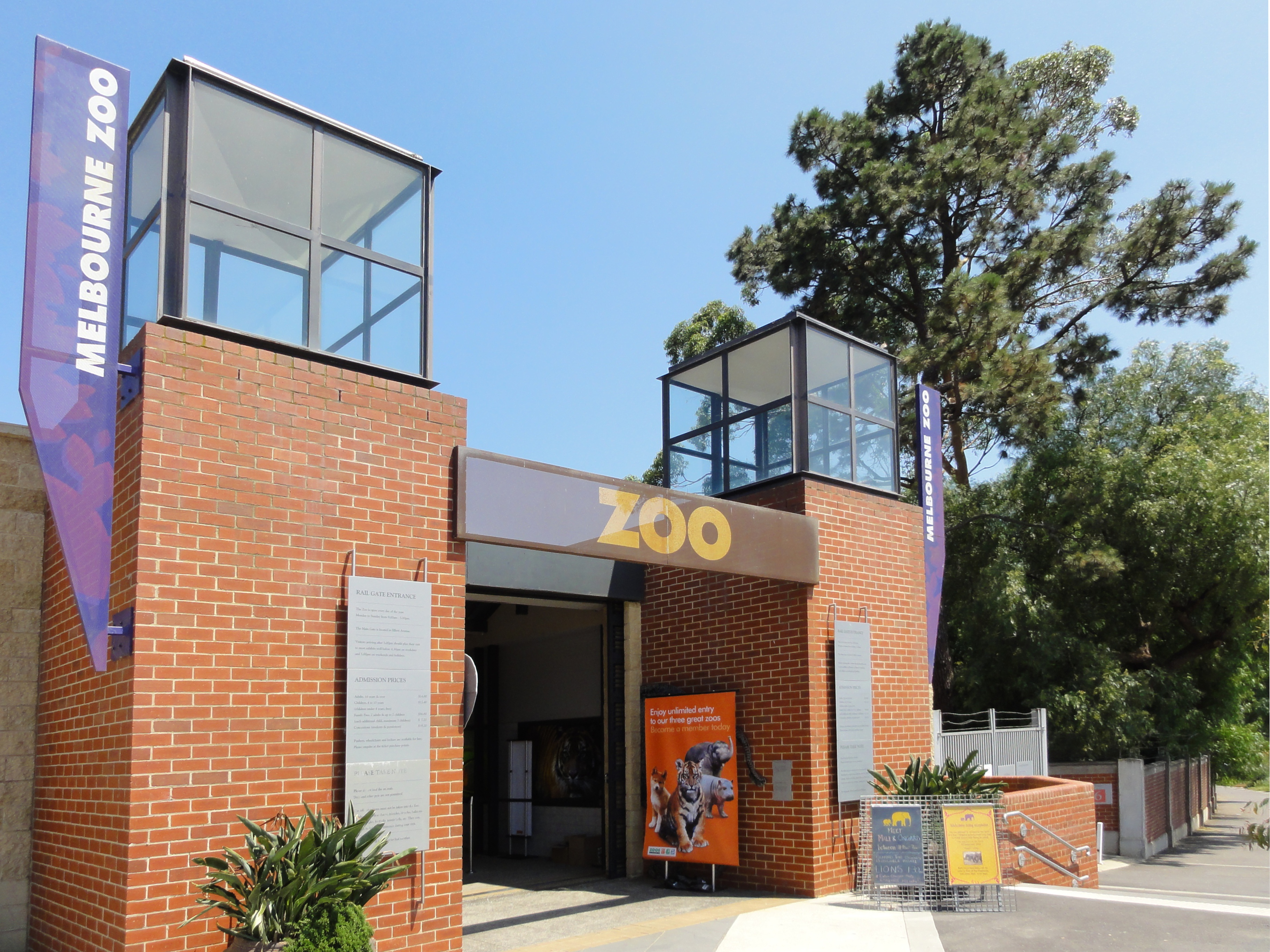
The Rail Gate entrance, at the north of the zoo near to Royal Park railway station

One of the most famous exhibits from the early 1900s to the 1940s was Queenie the elephant.

In the mid-1930s, the society had financial troubles. In response the Zoological Gardens Act 1936 (No. 4431) was passed, handing the zoo to a newly appointed Zoological Board of Victoria on behalf of the state government in 1937.

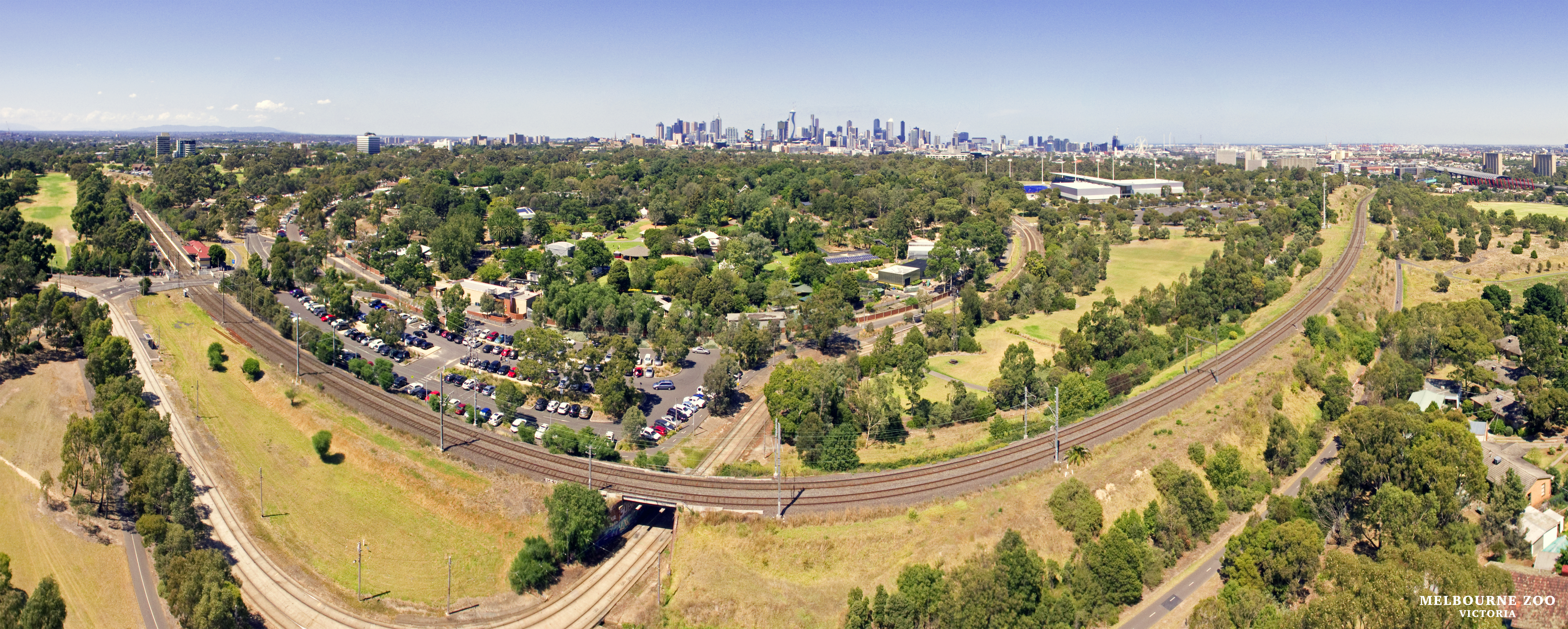
Melbourne Zoo aerial panorama, February 2017

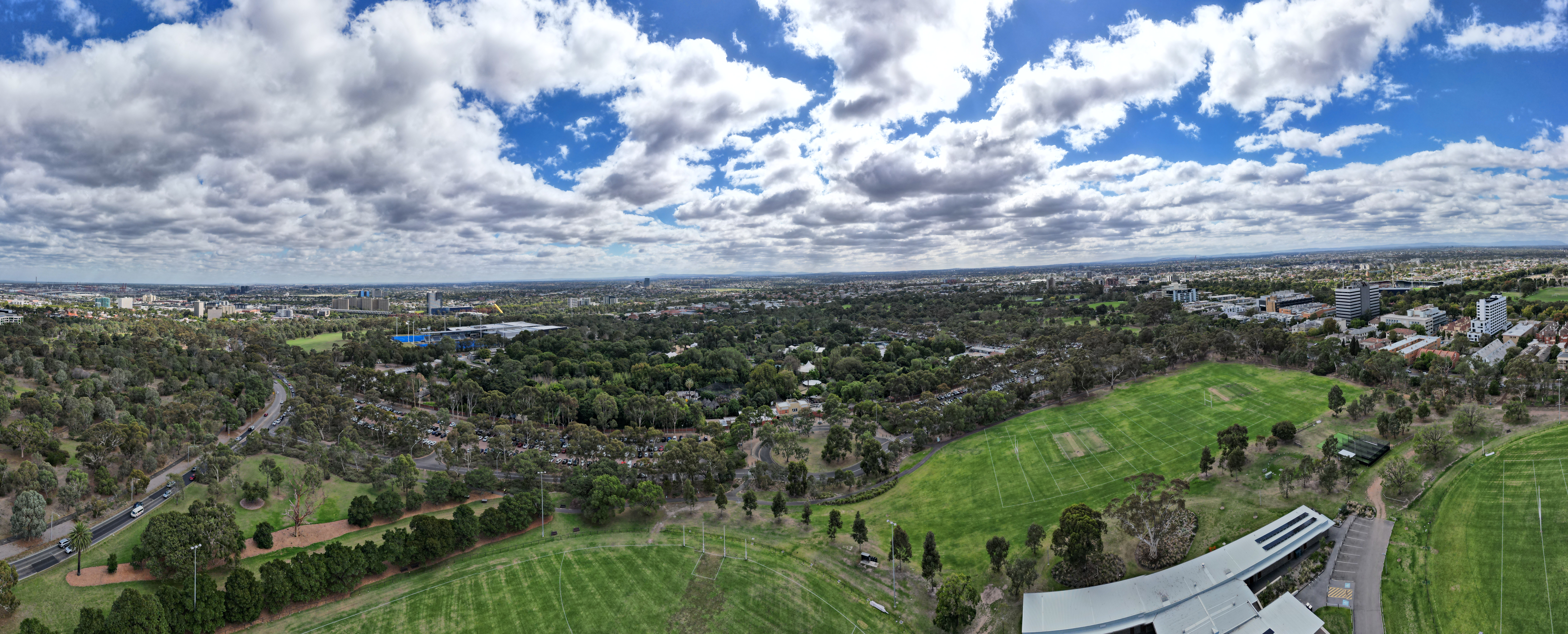
Aerial panorama of Parkville, and the Melbourne Zoo, April 2025

In 1964, the acclaimed Lion Park exhibit opened, with an elevated walkway overlooking and separating two exhibits. It was demolished and replaced by a new lion exhibit in 2014.

Australia's first gorilla birth occurred at Melbourne Zoo in 1984. Giant pandas were loaned to the zoo from China for an exhibition to celebrate Australia's bicentennial in 1988.

In 1989, a 35-year-old man died when he was partially eaten by a lion after he entered its pen.

The Trail of the Elephants exhibit was unveiled in 2003 and won numerous awards. On 15 January 2010 Melbourne Zoo welcomed its first elephant calf, Mali. This is the second elephant calf born in Australia, the first being in Sydney in July 2009. Mali is the first female calf born in Australia and the first calf born via artificial insemination. The zoo's elephant herd were relocated to its 'sibling' zoo Werribee Open Range Zoo in February 2025 to live in a new 21 hecatre state-of-the-art home. The Trail of the Elephants precinct was renamed 'Forest of Wonder'.

Melbourne Zoo commemorated 150 years of operation in 2012 and this was celebrated in an Australian Zoos collector's edition of stamps released by Australia Post in September 2012.

The zoo completed construction and opened a new carnivores trail in early 2018.

Additions to the ground include picnic lawns, pavilions, former cages now historical reflections, function centres, cafeterias, a carousel, and a Japanese garden including a pond lake with an island (currently home to some of the zoo's Siamang gibbons).

== Zoos Victoria ==
Zoos Victoria administers the Melbourne Zoo, as well as the Werribee Open Range Zoo, which features herbivorous creatures in an open-range mostly African setting with a safari bus tour similar to San Diego Zoo Safari Park; and Healesville Sanctuary (formerly the Sir Colin MacKenzie Sanctuary), which exhibits Australian fauna on 175 hectares (430 acres) of bushland and has a wildlife hospital for rescued native animals.

The three zoos have been collectively trading as Zoos Victoria since 1973, governed by the Zoological Parks and Gardens Board, which operates under the Zoological Parks and Gardens Act 1995.

In July 2022, Kyabram Fauna Park joined Zoos Victoria.

Colossal Biosciences and Zoos Victoria began a conservation project in October 2023 to preserve the Victorian grassland earless dragon as well as sequence its genome.

== The Carousel ==
The carousel was manufactured in England and then brought to Australia in 1886 by a family that ran a touring carnival, visiting country towns in Victoria. After touring with the carnival for over 60 years, in 1952 the carousel became part of a fun fair at the Melbourne Zoo, but was still owned by the same families. When the fun fair at the zoo was permanently closed in 1997, the carousel was purchased by the zoo. By that time, the carousel was in a deteriorated condition. It was restored off-site in 2004-2005 with funding from Heritage Victoria and re-opened in August 2005. The carousel is listed by Heritage Victoria as a heritage place.

== Exhibits ==
Gorilla Rainforest

- Asian small-clawed otter
- Black-and-white ruffed lemur
- Black-headed python
- Boyd's forest dragon
- Collared peccary
- Eastern Pilbara spiny-tailed skink
- Pink-tongued lizard
- Pygmy hippopotamus
- Ring-tailed lemur
- Southern Pilbara rock goanna
- Western lowland gorilla

Treetops Apes & Monkeys

- Cotton-top tamarin
- Eastern black-and-white colobus
- Emperor tamarin
- Northern white-cheeked gibbon

Growing Wild

- Aldabra giant tortoise
- Blue-and-yellow macaw
- Central bearded dragon
- Centralian blue-tongued lizard
- Chameleon gecko
- Fijian crested iguana
- Meerkat
- Northern banded knob-tailed gecko
- Red-tailed black cockatoo
- Scheltopusik
- Southern corroboree frog
- Victorian grassland earless dragon

Forest of Wonder (used to be known as Trail of the Elephants)

- Asian small-clawed otter
- Black-winged stilt
- Bolivian squirrel monkey
- Luzon bleeding-heart dove
- Noisy pitta
- Rose-crowned fruit dove
- Sacred kingfisher
- Siamang
- Sumatran orangutan
- Sumatran tiger
- Zebra finch

Butterfly House

- Australian leafwing
- Australian painted lady
- Chocolate argus
- Eastern red lacewing
- Meadow argus
- Orchard swallowtail butterfly
- Yellow admiral

Insect House

- Australian leaf insect
- Bundaberg banded snail
- Diving beetle
- Egyptian beetle
- Giant burrowing cockroach
- Giant golden orb-weaving spider
- Golden huntsmen
- Rainforest millipede
- Rainforest tree katydid
- Red-spotted rose chaffer
- Rock orb-weaver

Wild Sea

- Banggai cardinal fish
- Big-belly seahorse
- Boesemani rainbowfish
- Chinese algae eater
- Eastern fiddler ray
- Flame angelfish
- Globefish
- Goyder River rainbowfish
- Green chromis
- Little penguin
- Magnificent rabbitfish
- Moon jellyfish
- Moonlighter
- Murray River rainbowfish
- Neon rainbowfish
- New Zealand fur seal
- Ocellaris clownfish
- Olive perchlet
- Pacific blue tang
- Port Jackson shark
- Sea sweep
- Silver mullet
- Six-spined leatherjacket
- Southern fiddler ray
- Southern purple-spotted gudgeon
- Southern rock lobster
- Yellow tang

Australian Bush

- Black swan
- Emu
- Forest red-tailed black cockatoo
- Kangaroo Island kangaroo
- Koala
- Lace monitor
- Quokka
- Rainbow lorikeet
- Regent honeyeater
- Short-beaked echidna
- Southern hairy-nosed wombat
- Swamp wallaby
- Tammar wallaby
- Tawny frogmouth
- Twenty-eight parrot
- White-browed woodswallow

Great Flight Aviary

- Black-faced cormorant
- Black-necked stork
- Blue-billed duck
- Blue-faced honeyeater
- Brown-capped emerald dove
- Buff-banded rail
- Bush stone curlew
- Cattle egret
- Freckled duck
- Glossy ibis
- Little pied cormorant
- Nicobar pigeon
- Pied heron
- Pied imperial pigeon
- Pink cockatoo
- Radjah shelduck
- Regent parrot
- Royal spoonbill
- Satin bowerbird
- Southern cassowary
- White-faced heron
- White-headed stilt

Lion Gorge

- African lion
- Binturong
- Dingo
- Snow leopard
- Sumatran tiger
- Tasmanian devil

DigestED

- Ball python
- Banded archerfish
- Chinese algae-eater
- Clown loach
- Gulf saratoga
- Kissing gourami
- Macleay’s water snake
- Magnificent tree frog
- Malayan blood python
- Orange lacewing
- Reticulated python
- Silver shark
- Taiwanese beauty snake

World of Frogs

- Australian green tree frog
- Baw Baw frog
- Boyd's forest dragon
- Crucifix frog
- Dainty green tree frog
- Desert tree frog
- Eastern dwarf tree frog
- Peron's tree frog
- Southern bell frog
- Southern corroboree frog
- Spotted tree frog
- Stuttering frog

Reptile House

- Amy's knob-tailed gecko
- Black-headed python
- Bleeding heart tetra
- Broad-headed snake
- Canberra grassland dragon
- Central netted dragon
- Coastal taipan
- Common death adder
- Corn snake
- Double-crested basilisk
- Eastern diamondback rattlesnake
- Elongated tortoise
- Eyelash viper
- Fiji crested iguana
- Frill-necked lizard
- Golden coin turtle
- Honduran milk snake
- Hosmer's skink
- Indian star tortoise
- Jungle carpet python
- Lace monitor
- Madagascar giant day gecko
- Malayan blood python
- Merten's water monitor
- Mexican cantil
- Monocled cobra
- Neon cardinal
- Philippine crocodile
- Pueblan milk snake
- Rainbow boa
- Red-barred dragon
- Reticulated gila monster
- Rhinoceros iguana
- Scheltopusik
- Shingleback lizard
- Short-finned eel
- Siamese algae eater
- Spiny terrapin
- Striped legless lizard
- Sunda king cobra
- Tiger snake
- Tokay gecko
- Twist-necked turtle
- Veiled chameleon

Tortoise Lawn

- Aldabra giant tortoise
- Carolina box turtle
- Hermann's tortoise
- Horsfield's tortoise

Eat and Play/Japanese Gardens Precinct

- Japanese koi
- Komodo dragon
- Red panda
- Siamang

Amazon Aviary

- Buffon's macaw
- Green-winged macaw
- Red-fronted macaw

Main Trail

- Giraffe
- Hamadryas baboon
- Nyala
- Platypus
- South American tapir

== Gallery ==
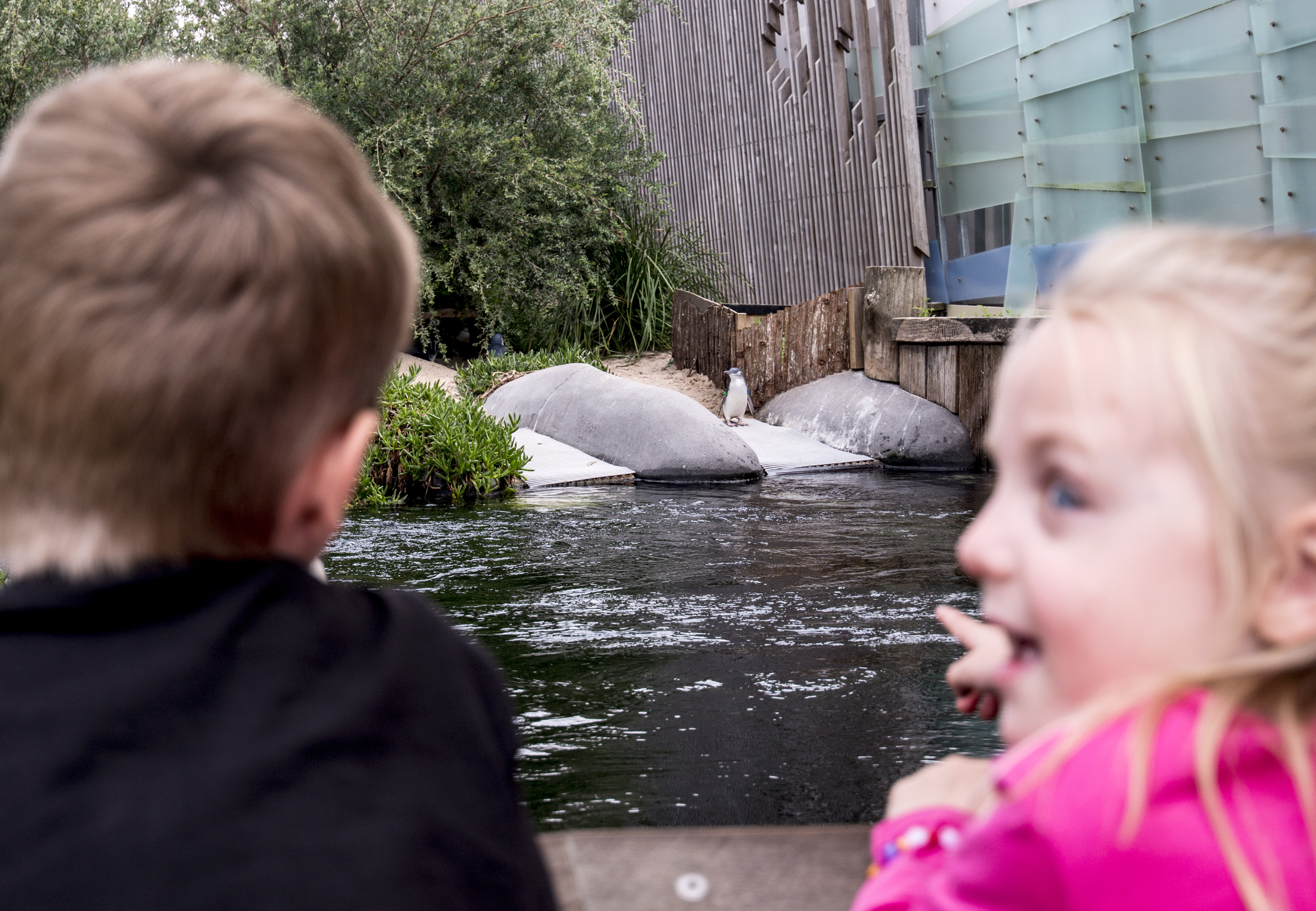
Little penguin exhibit

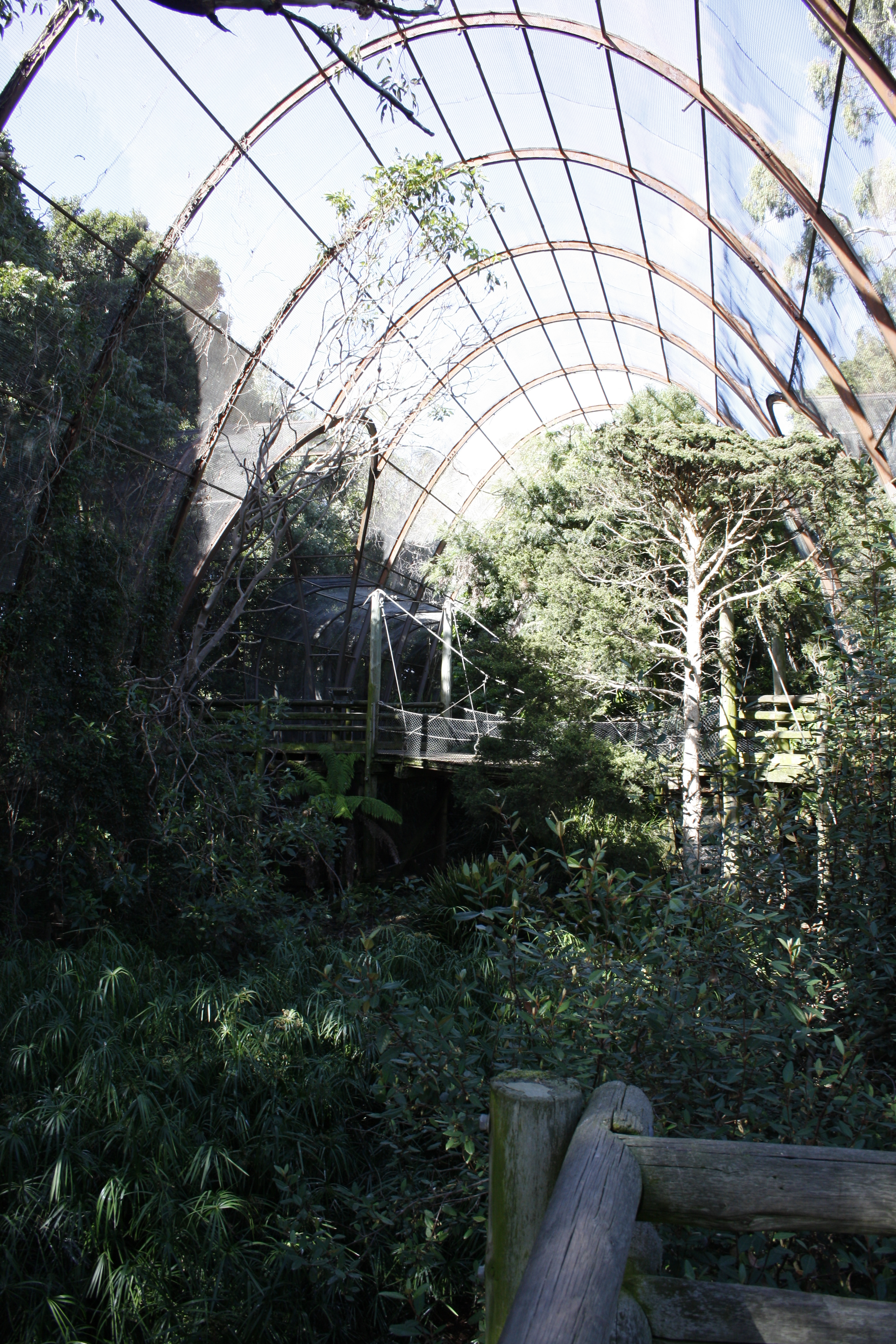
Inside the Great Flight Aviary

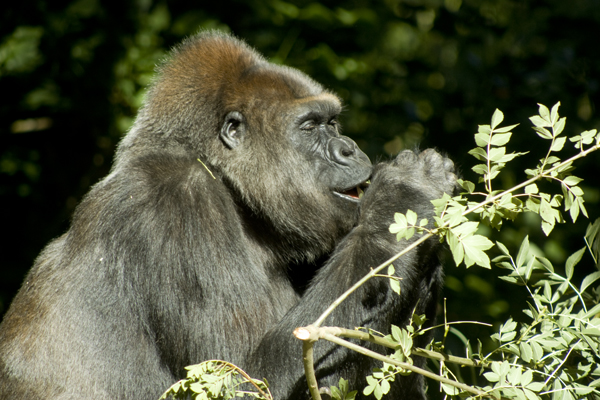
Western lowland gorilla

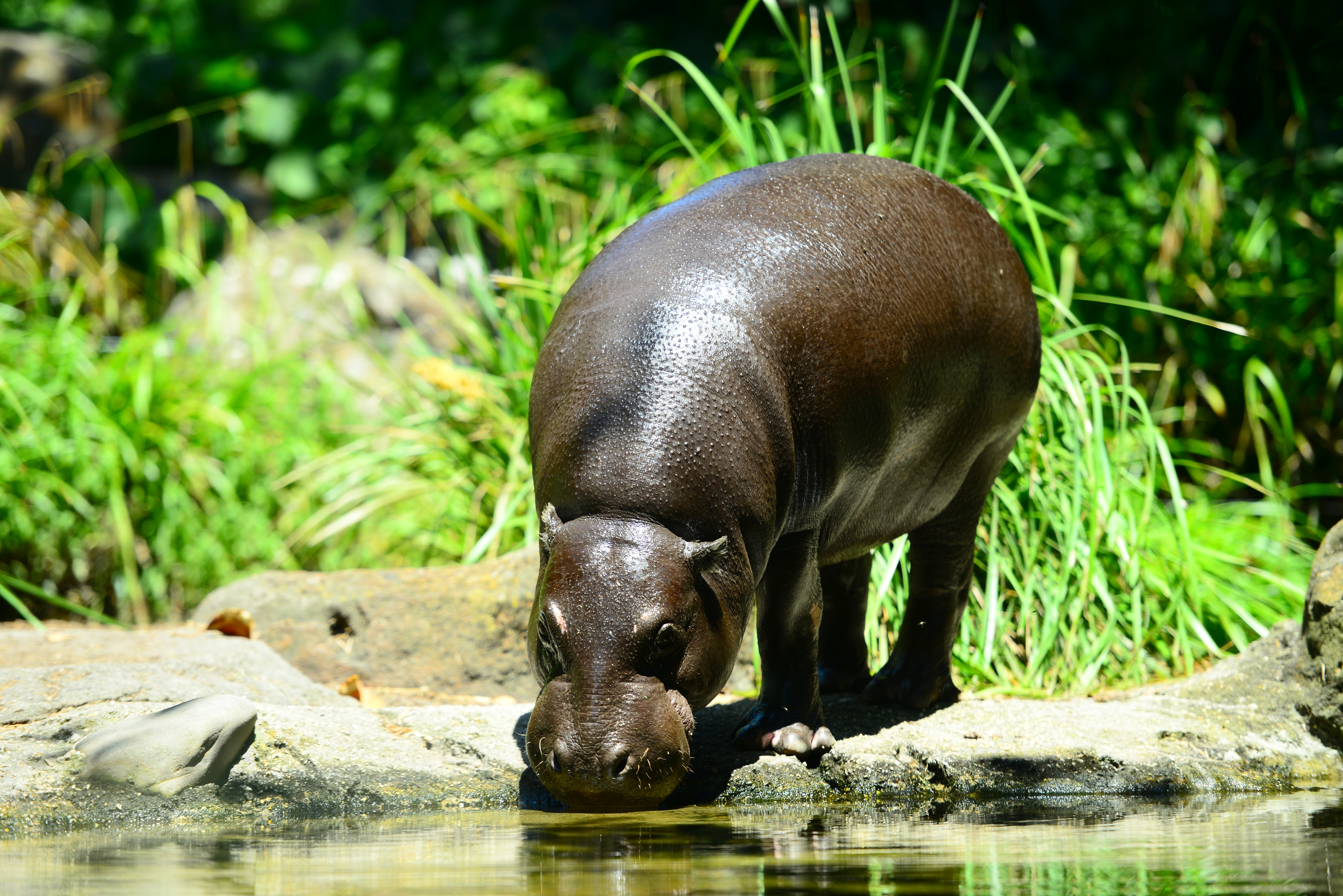
Pygmy hippo

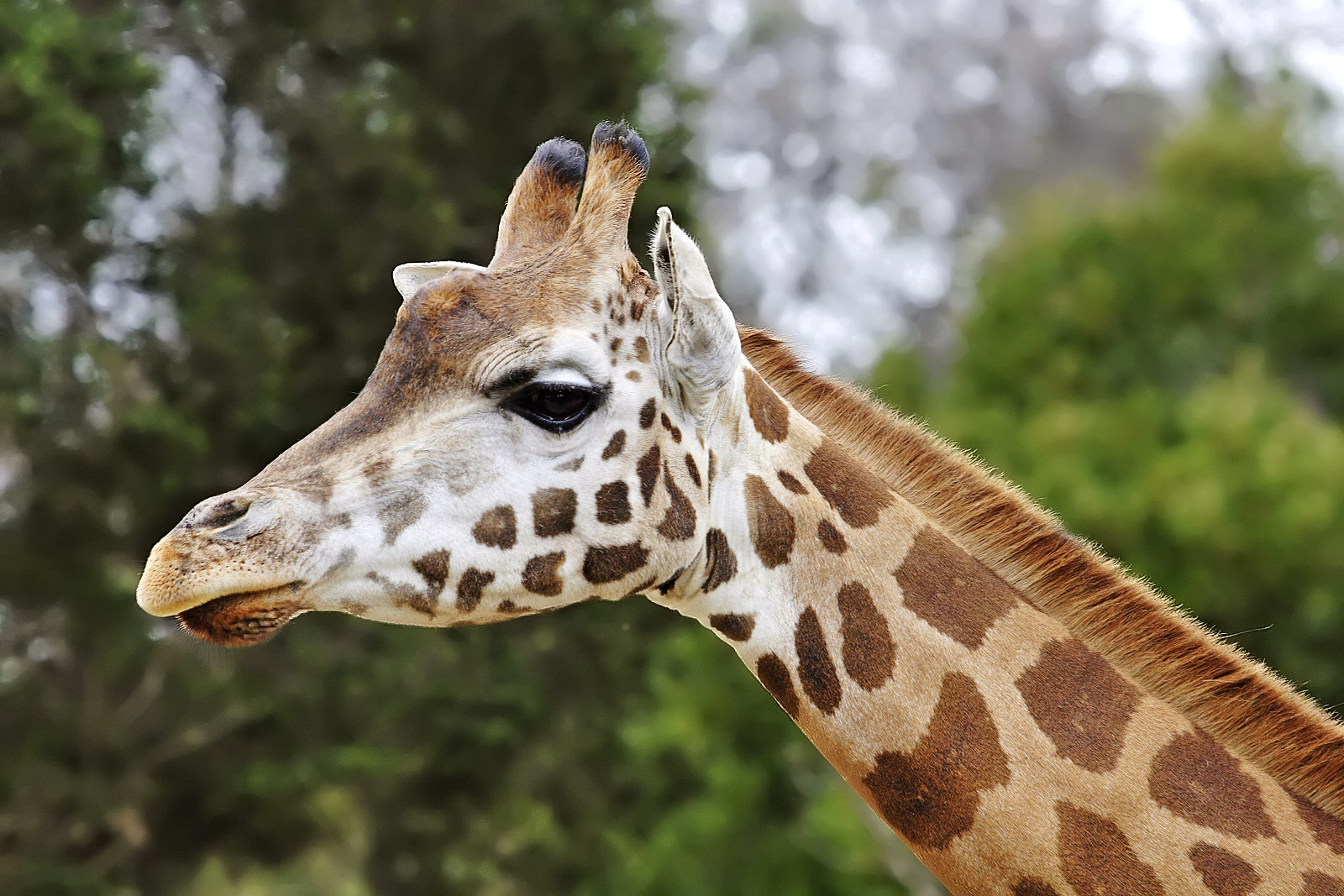
Giraffe

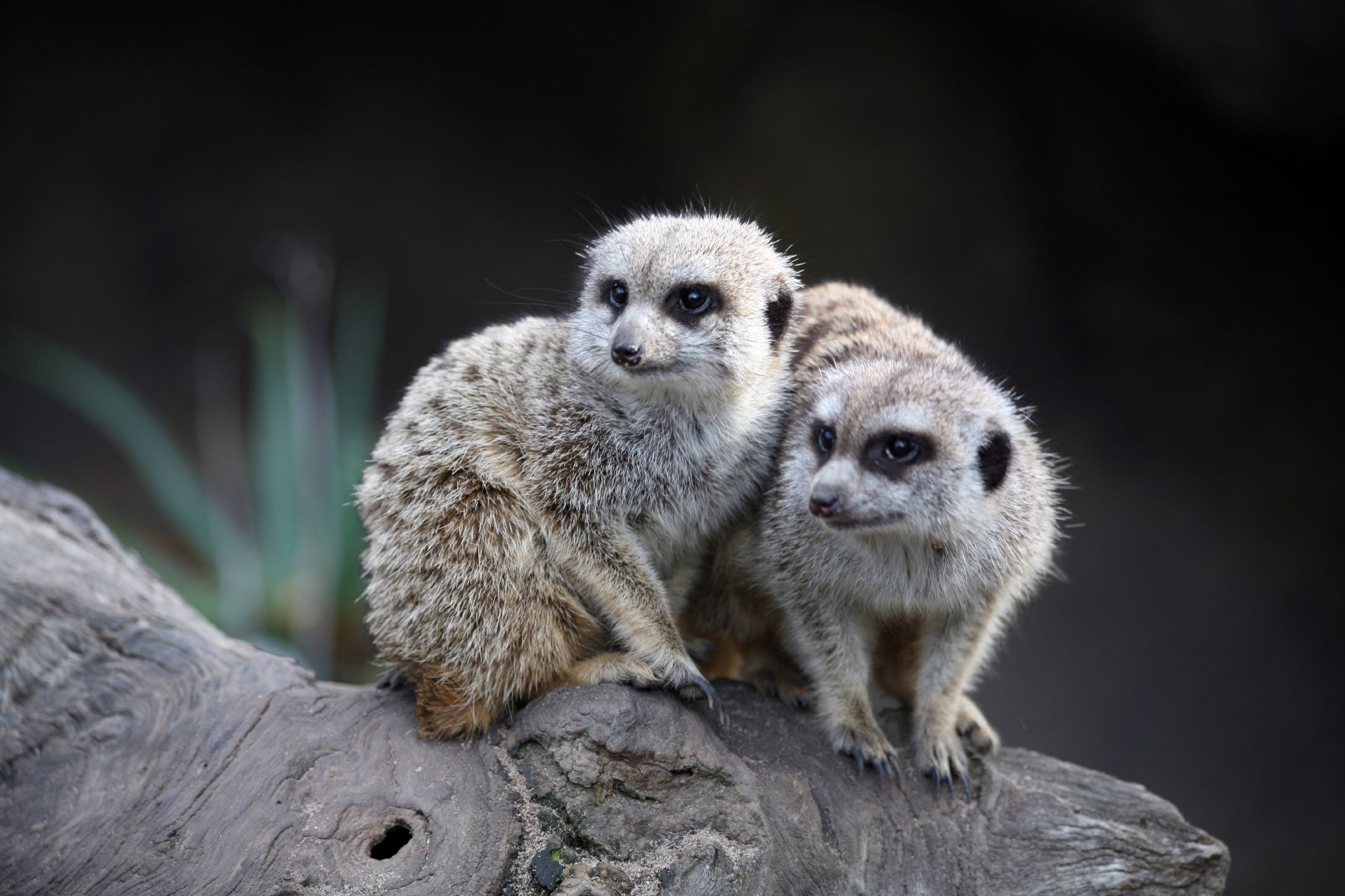
Meerkats

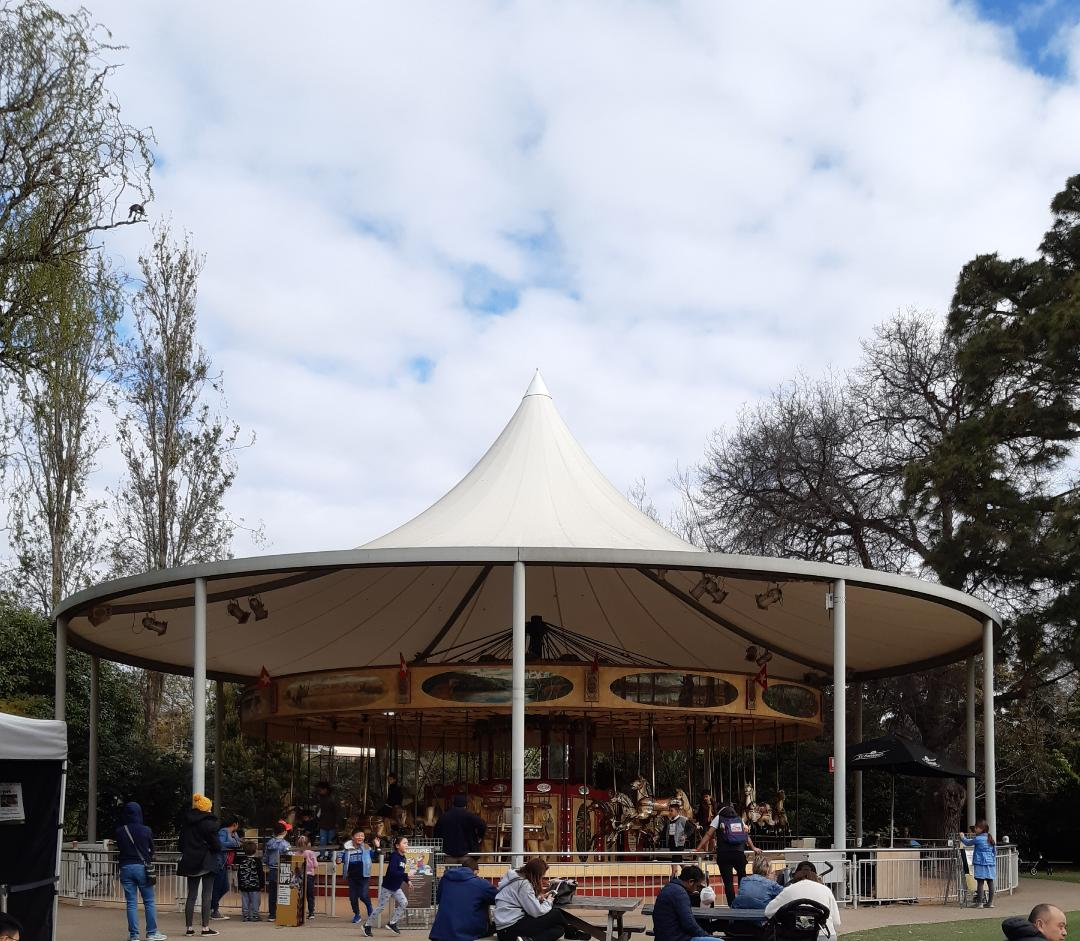
Historic carousel

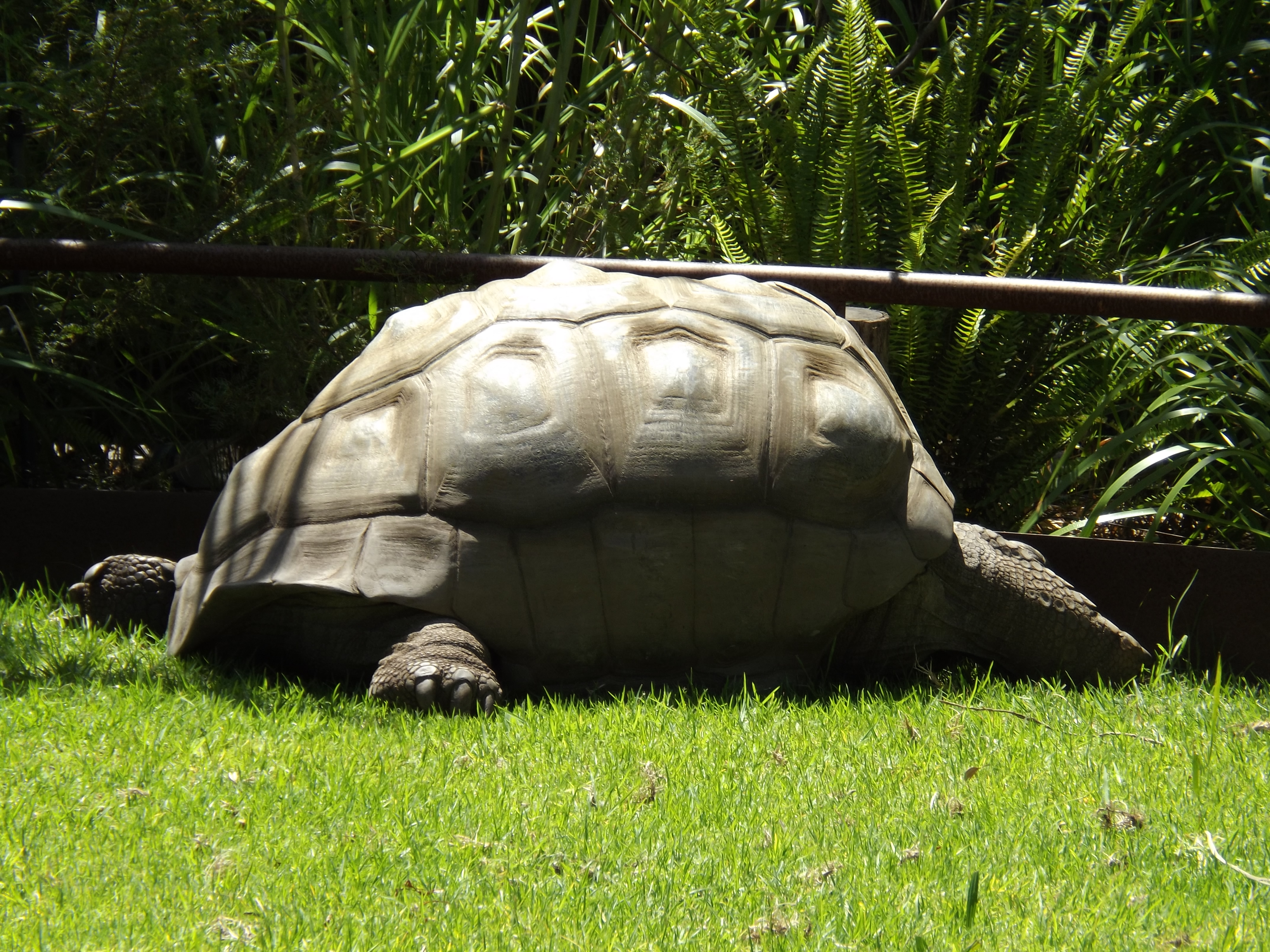
Aldabra giant tortoise

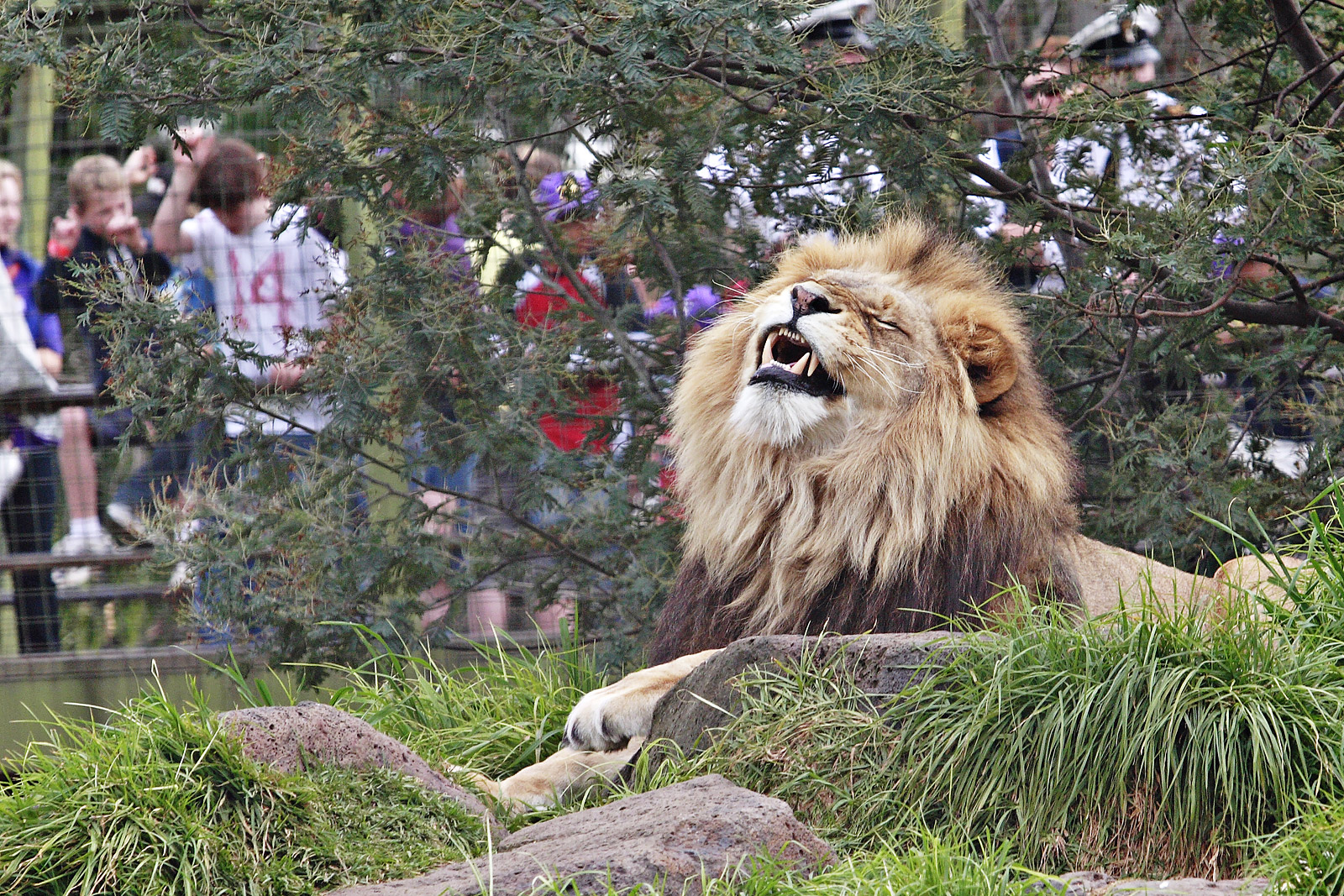
African lion

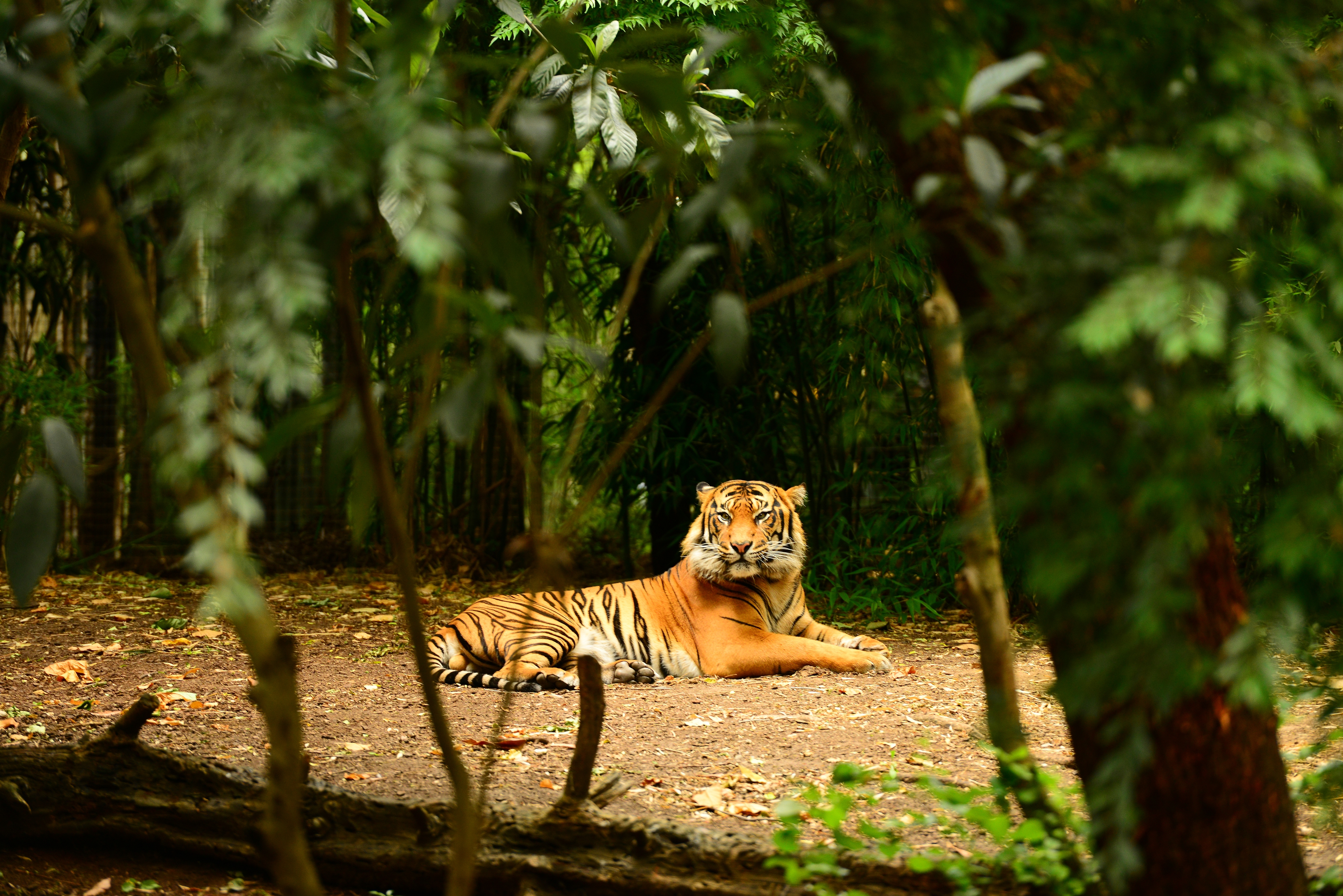
Sumatran tiger

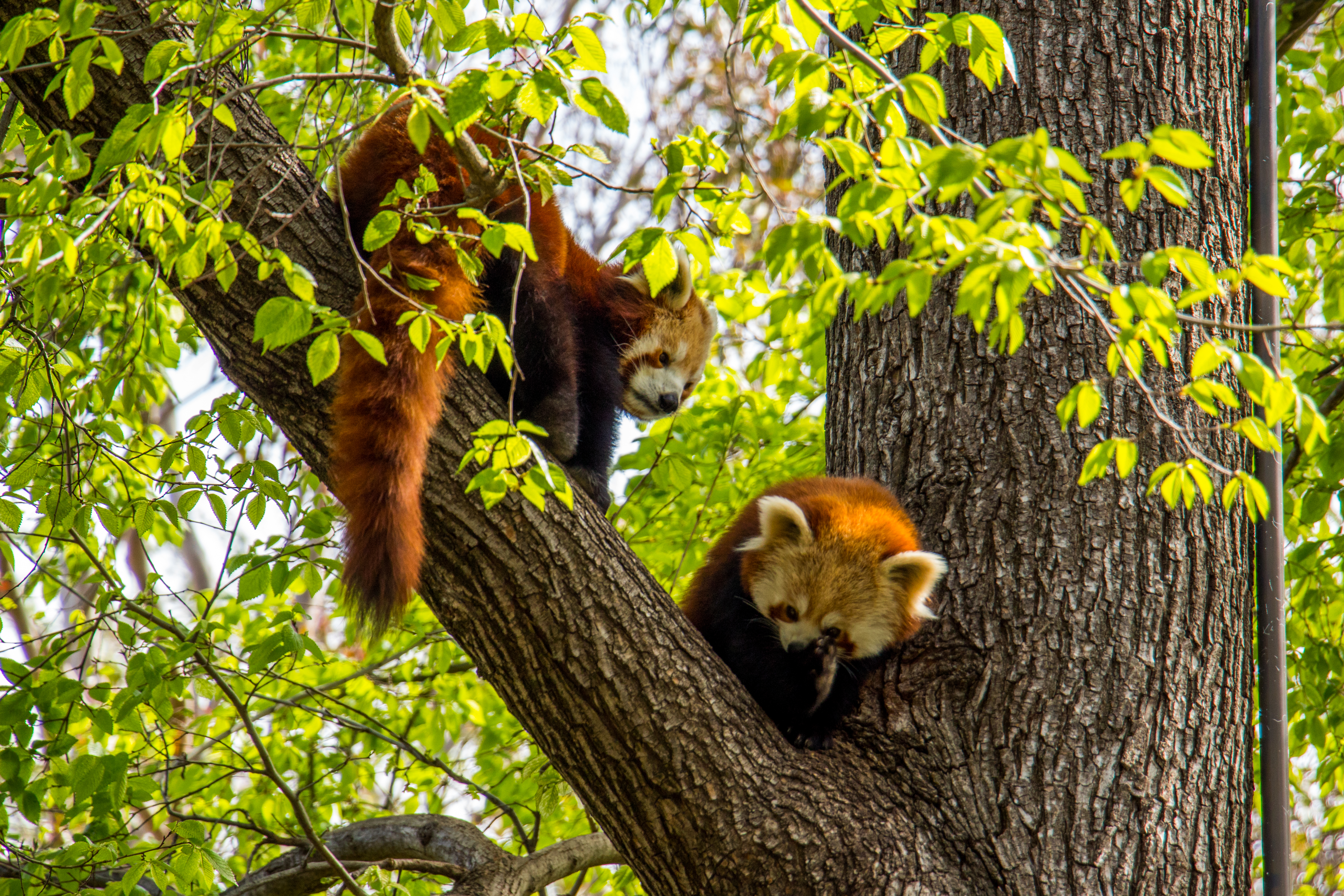
Red pandas

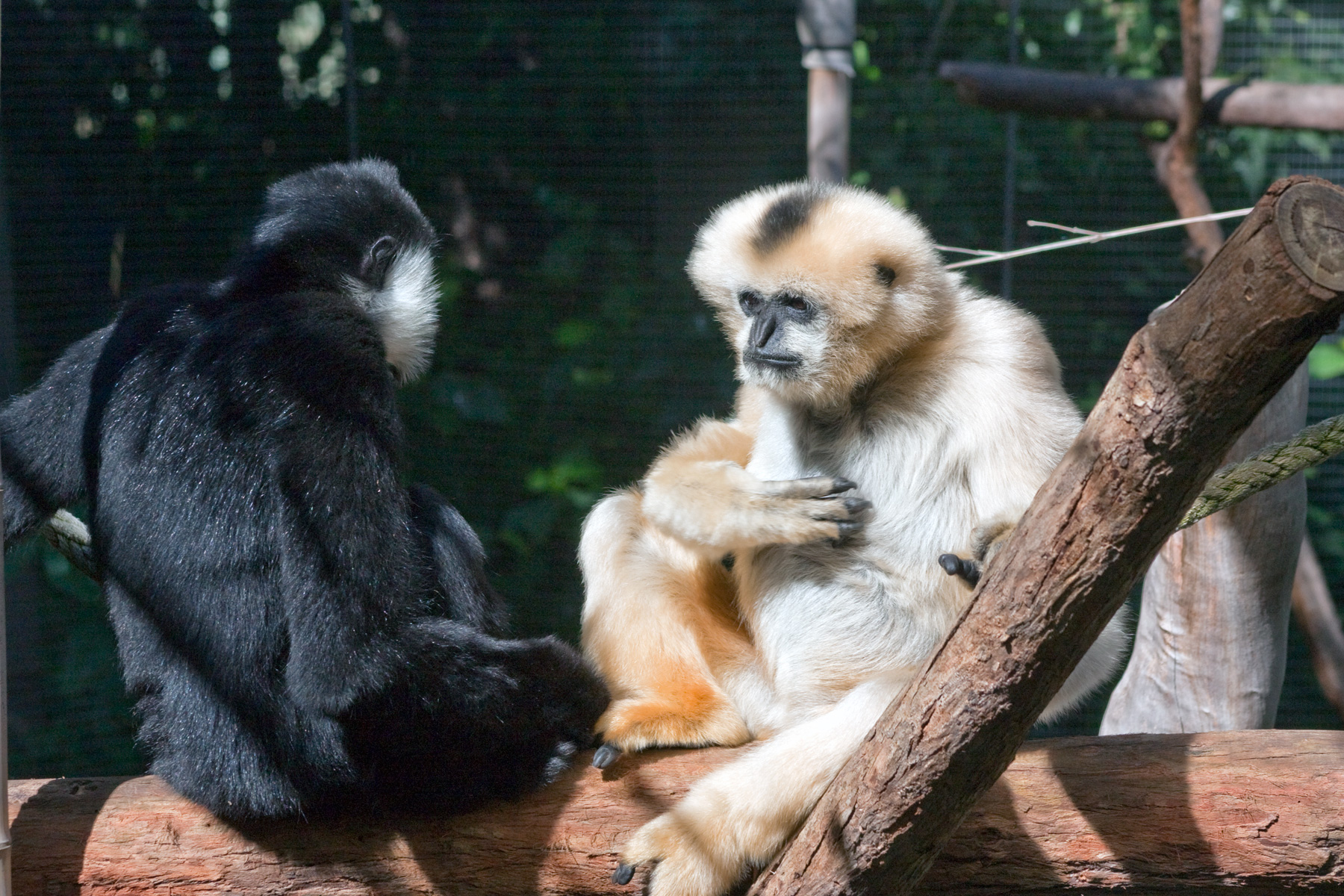
Northern white-cheeked gibbons

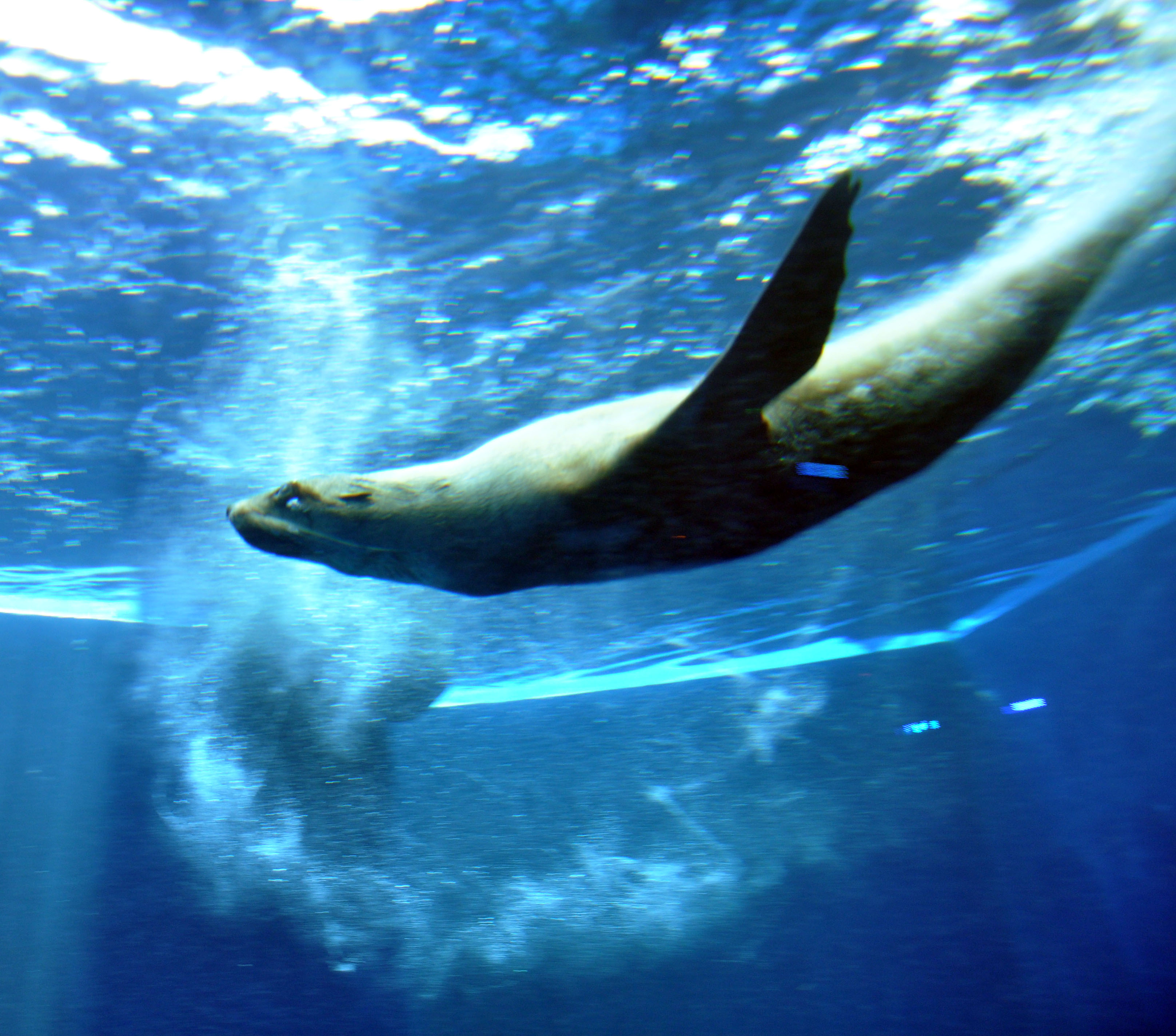
View of a fur seal swimming underwater

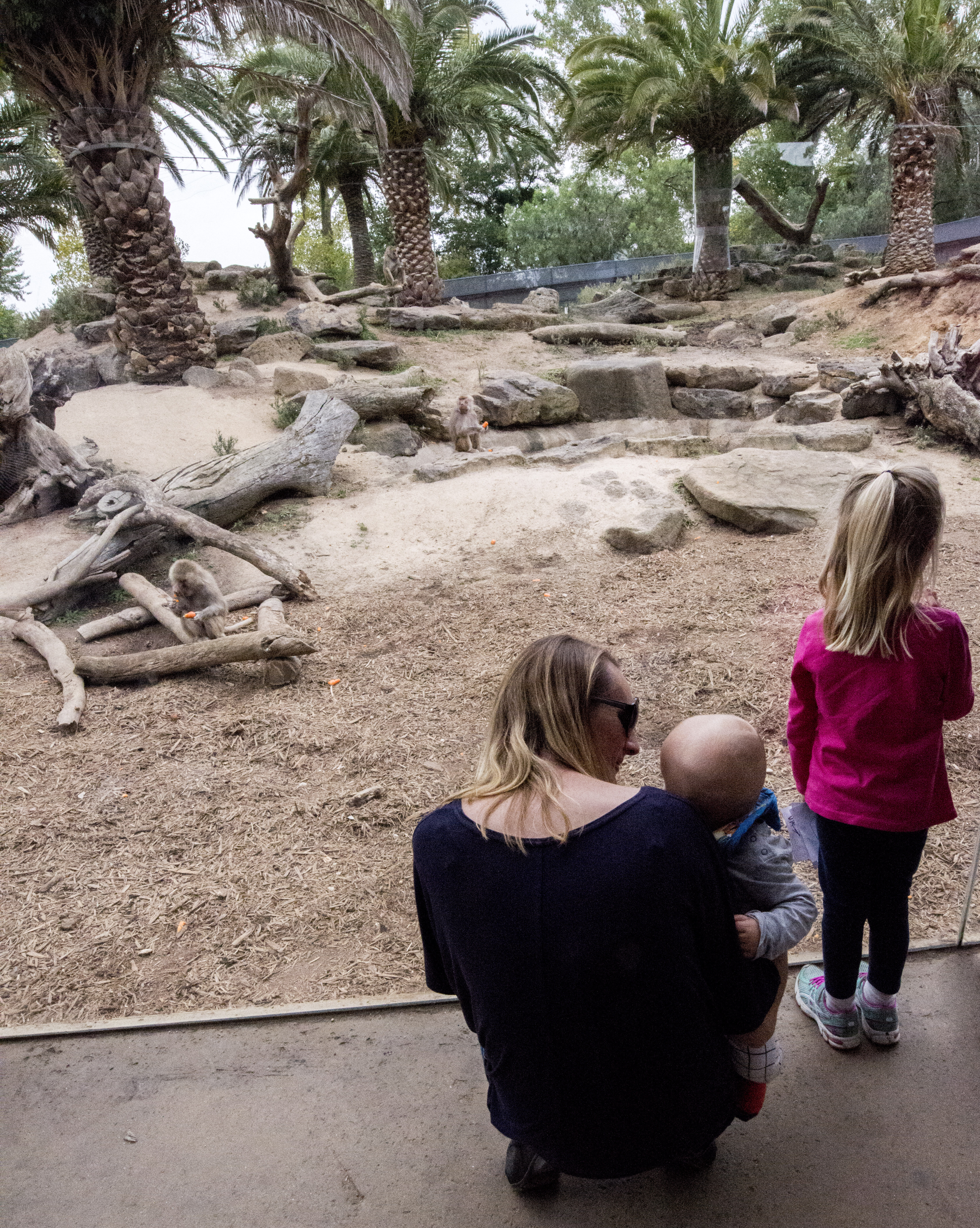
Up close viewing at the baboon exhibit.

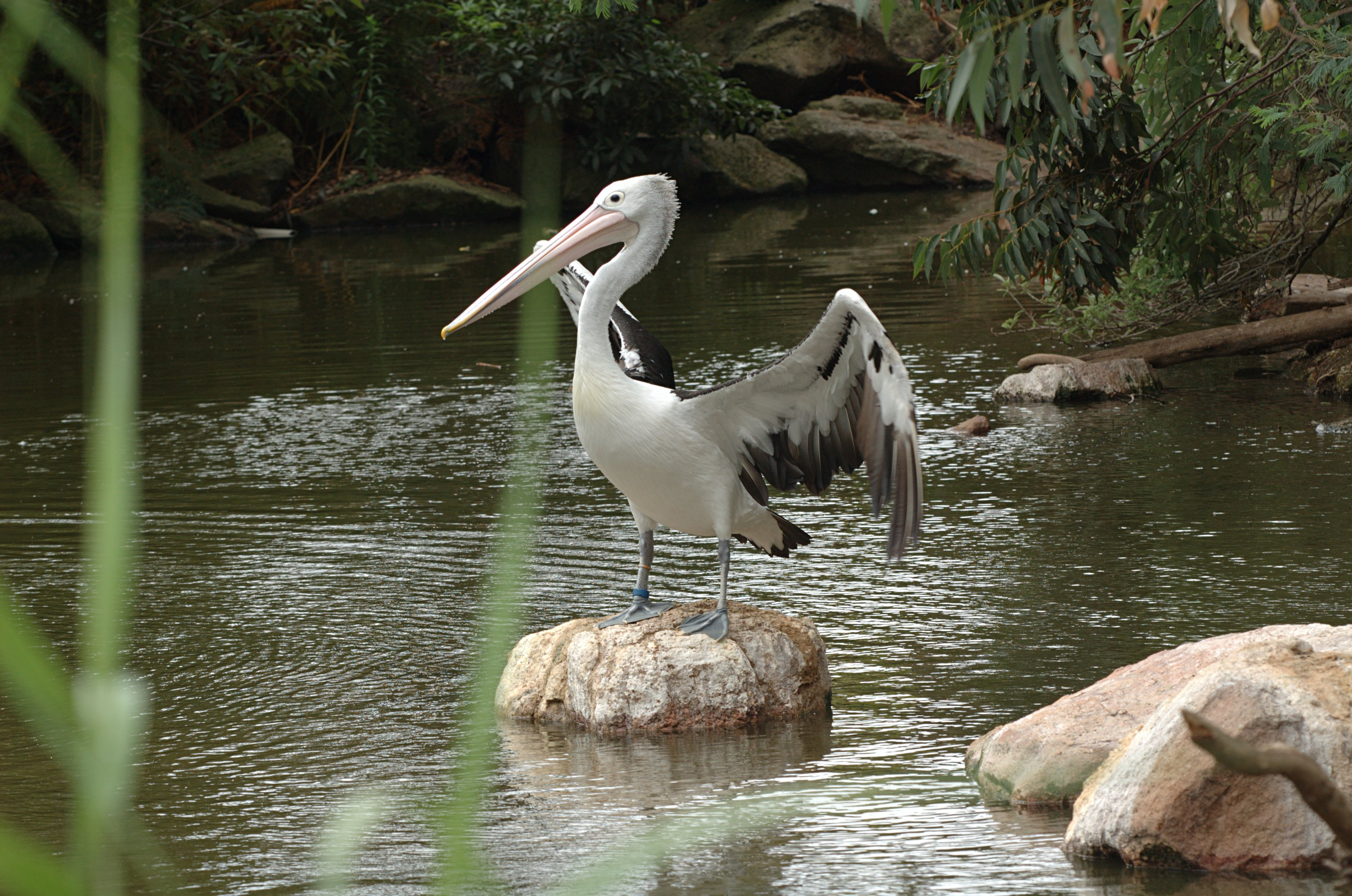
Australian pelican

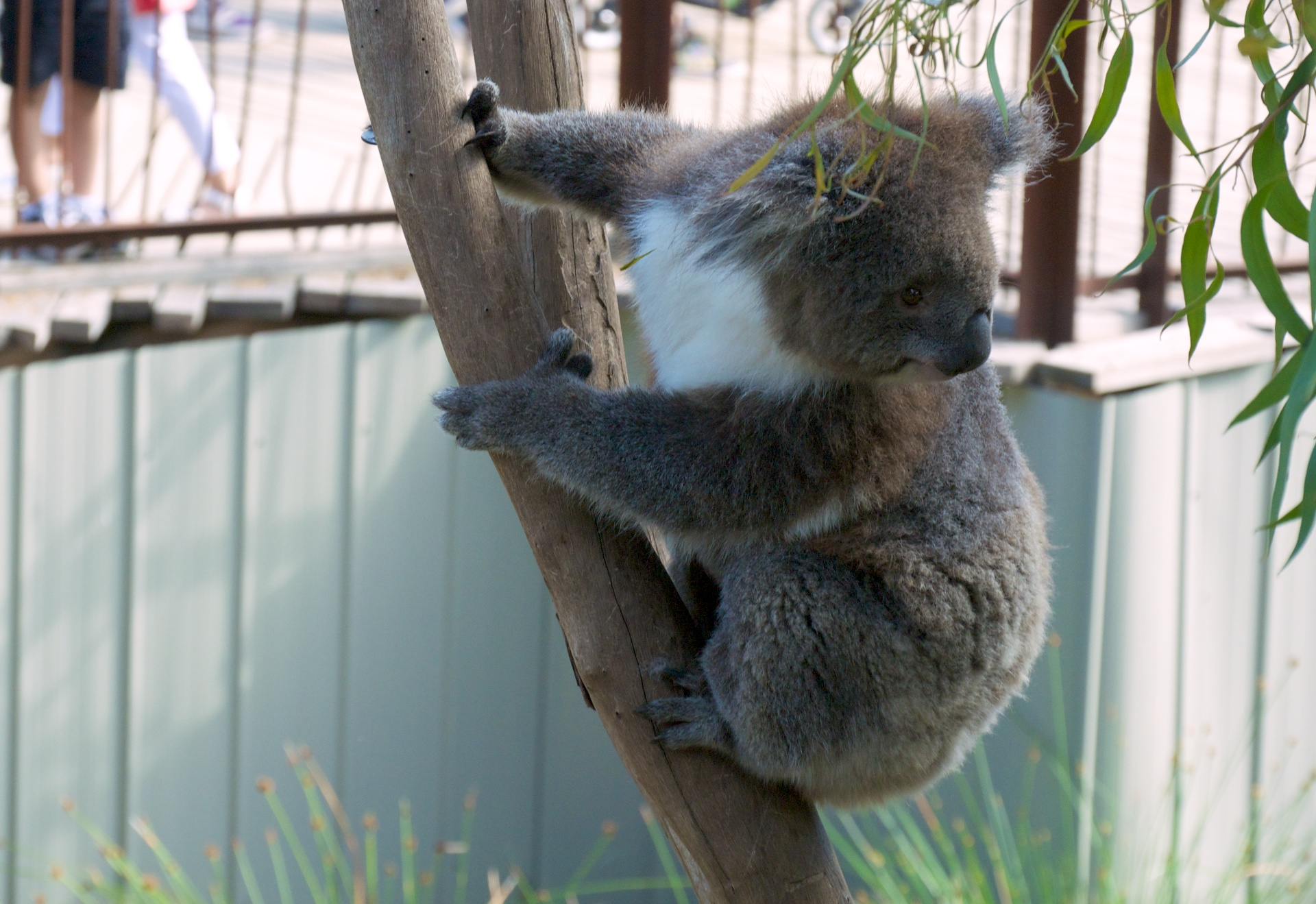
Koala

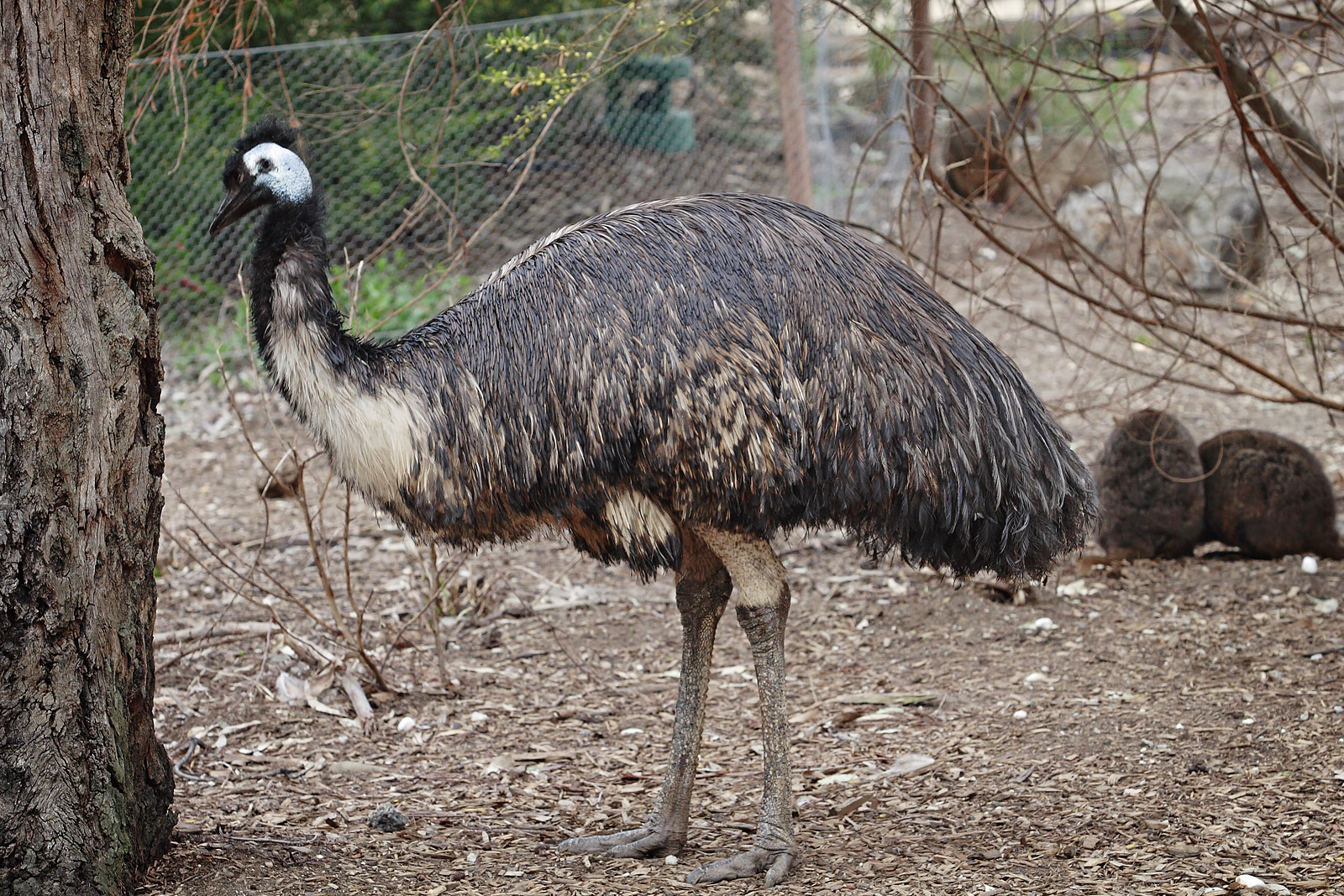
Emu

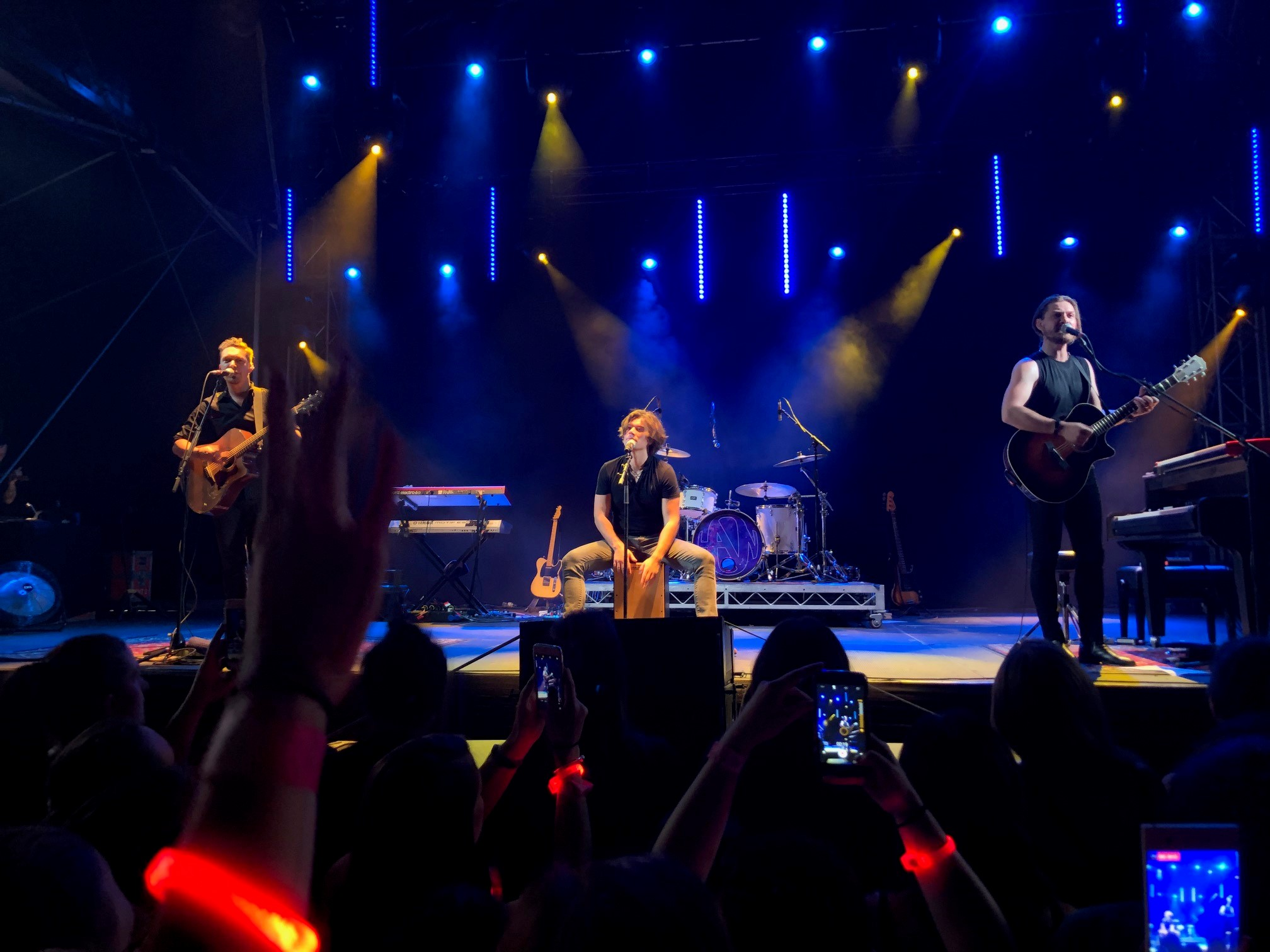
Different performances are held at the zoo.

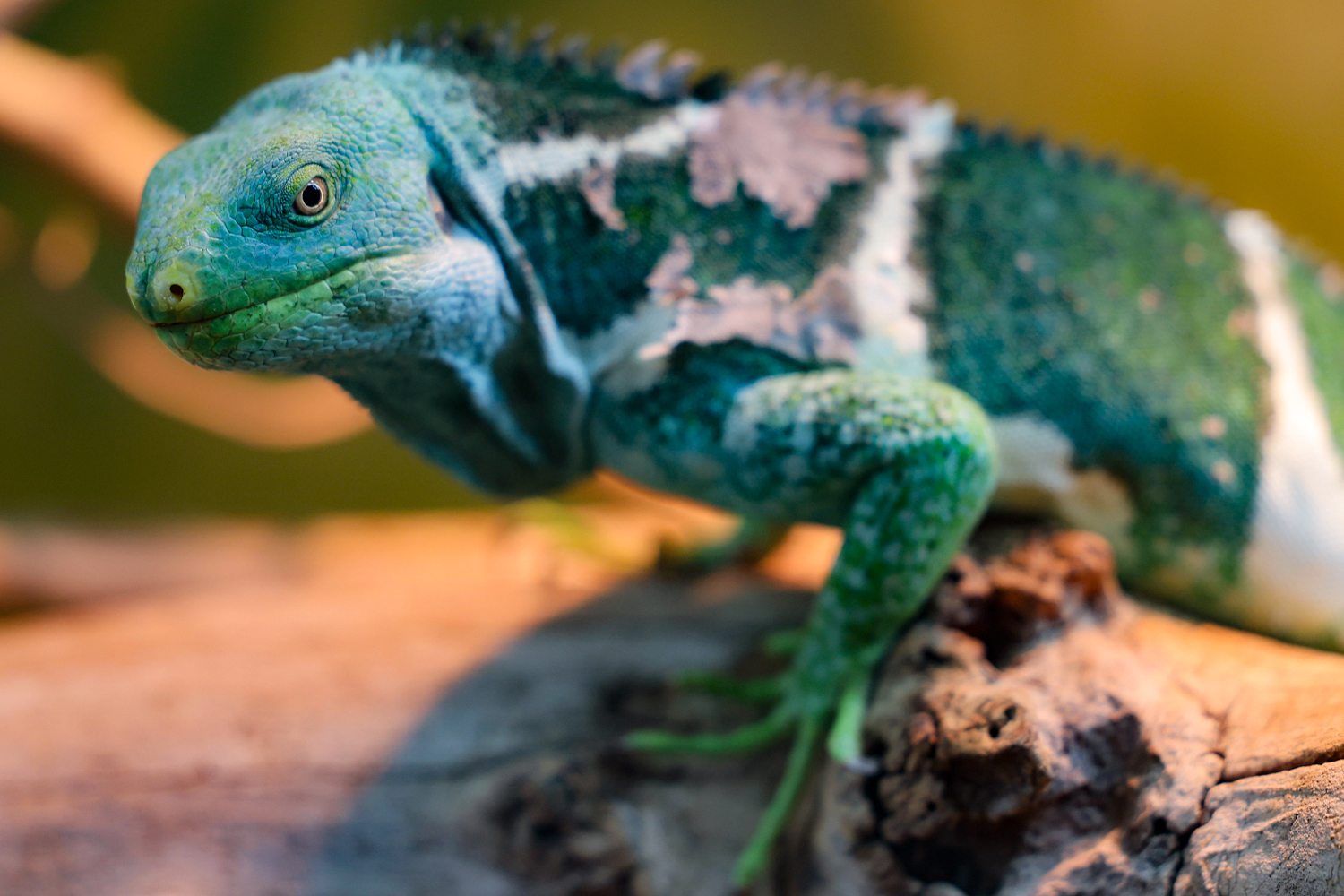
Fiji crested iguana

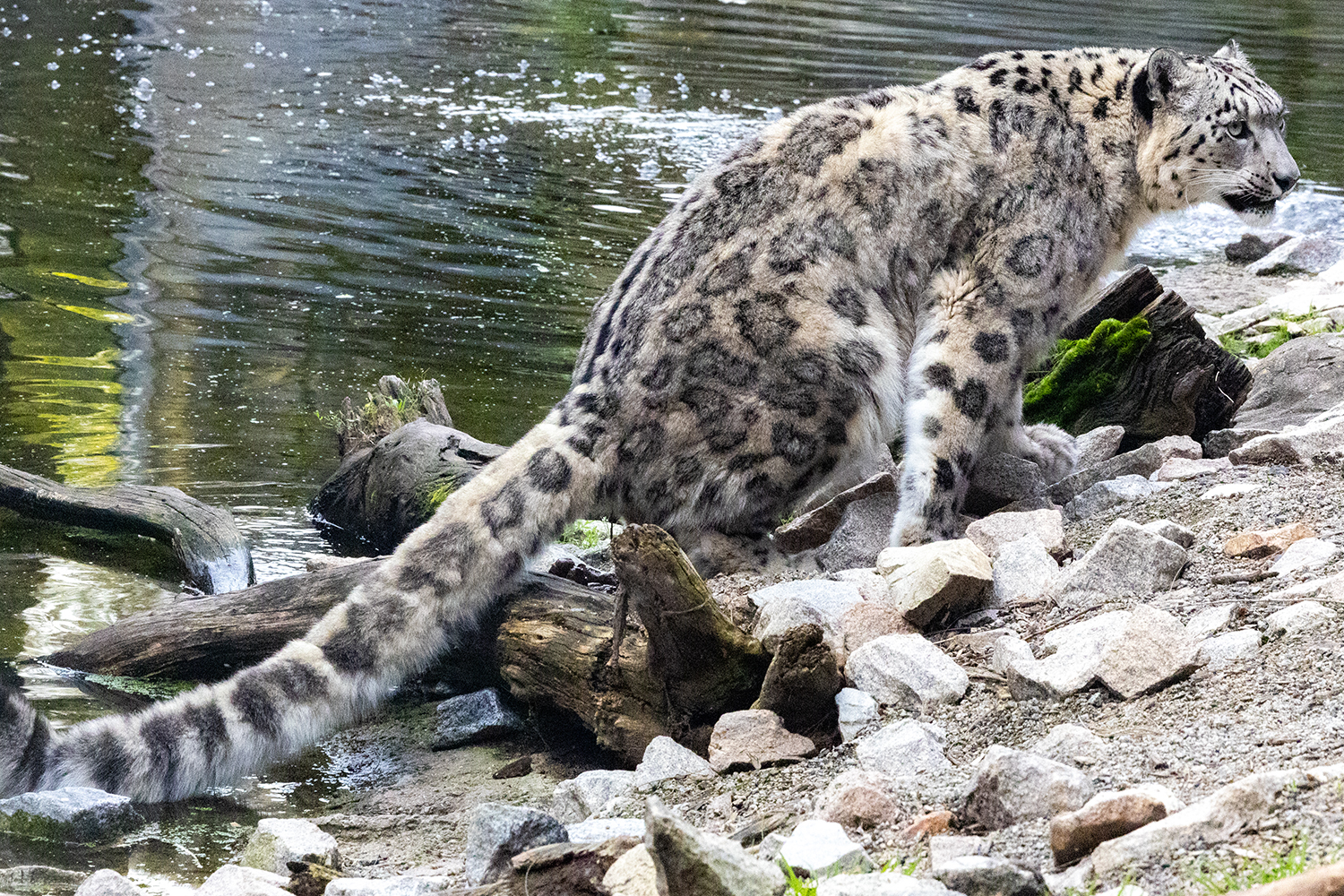
Snow leopard

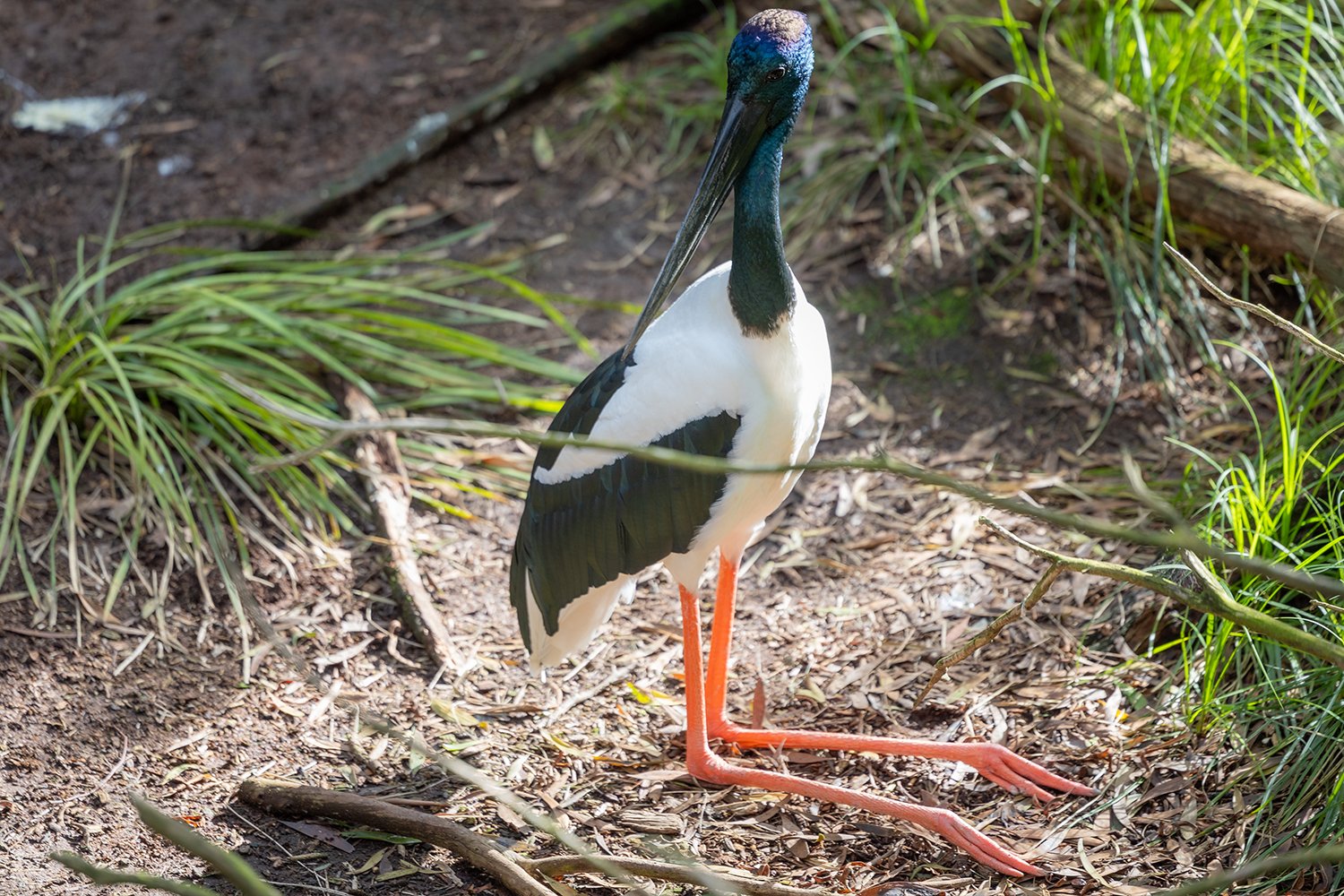
Black-necked stork

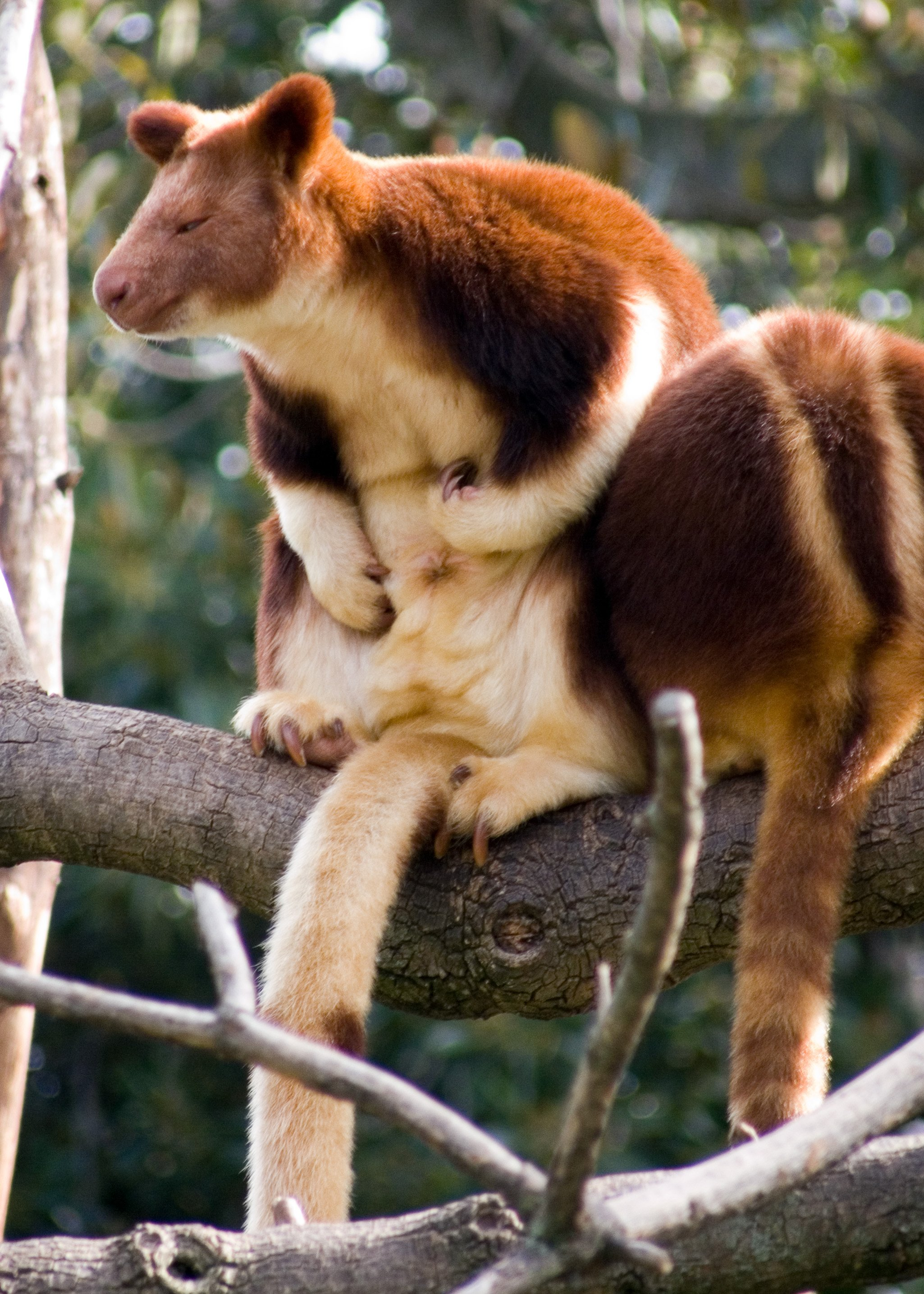
Goodfellow's tree-kangaroos

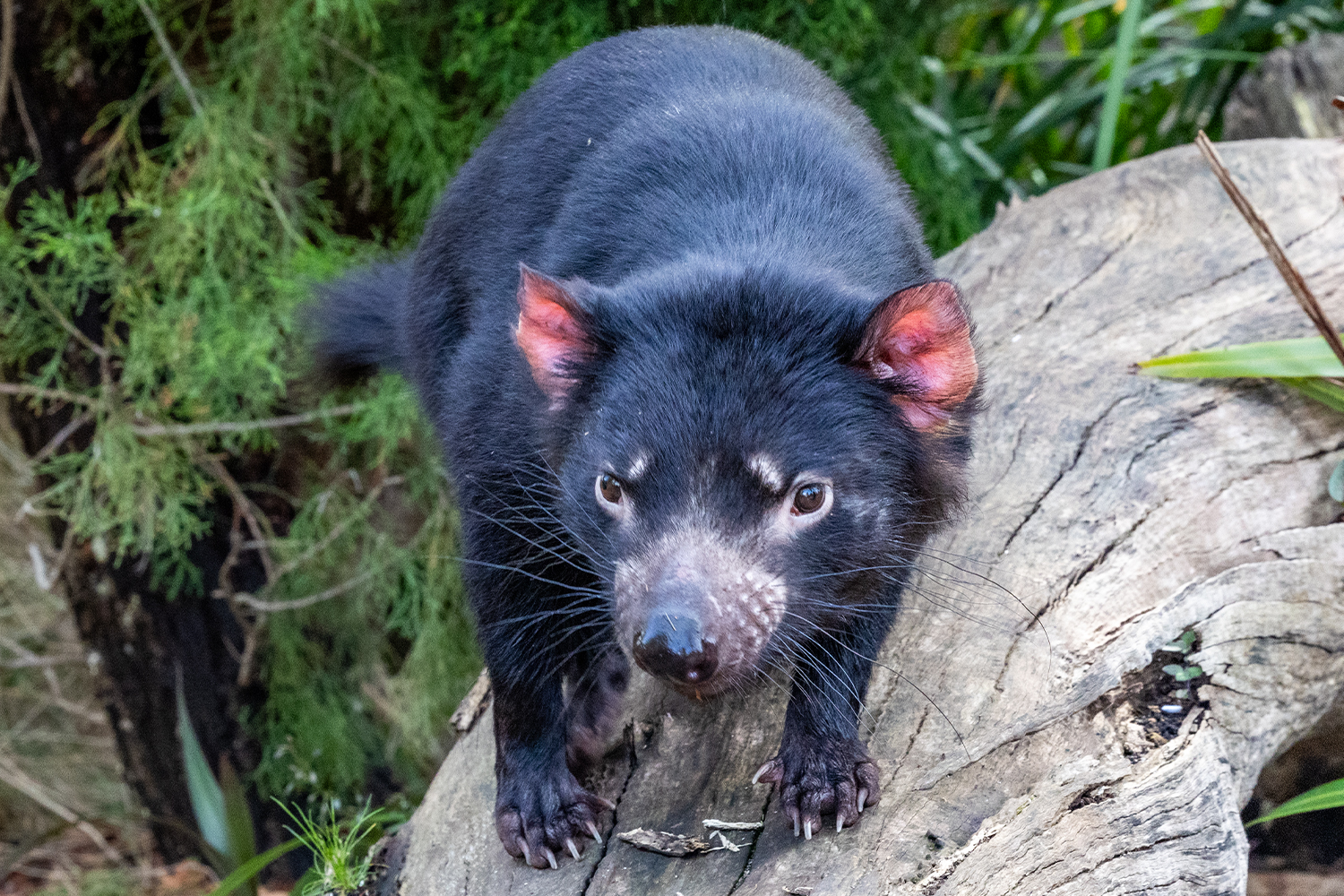
Tasmanian devil

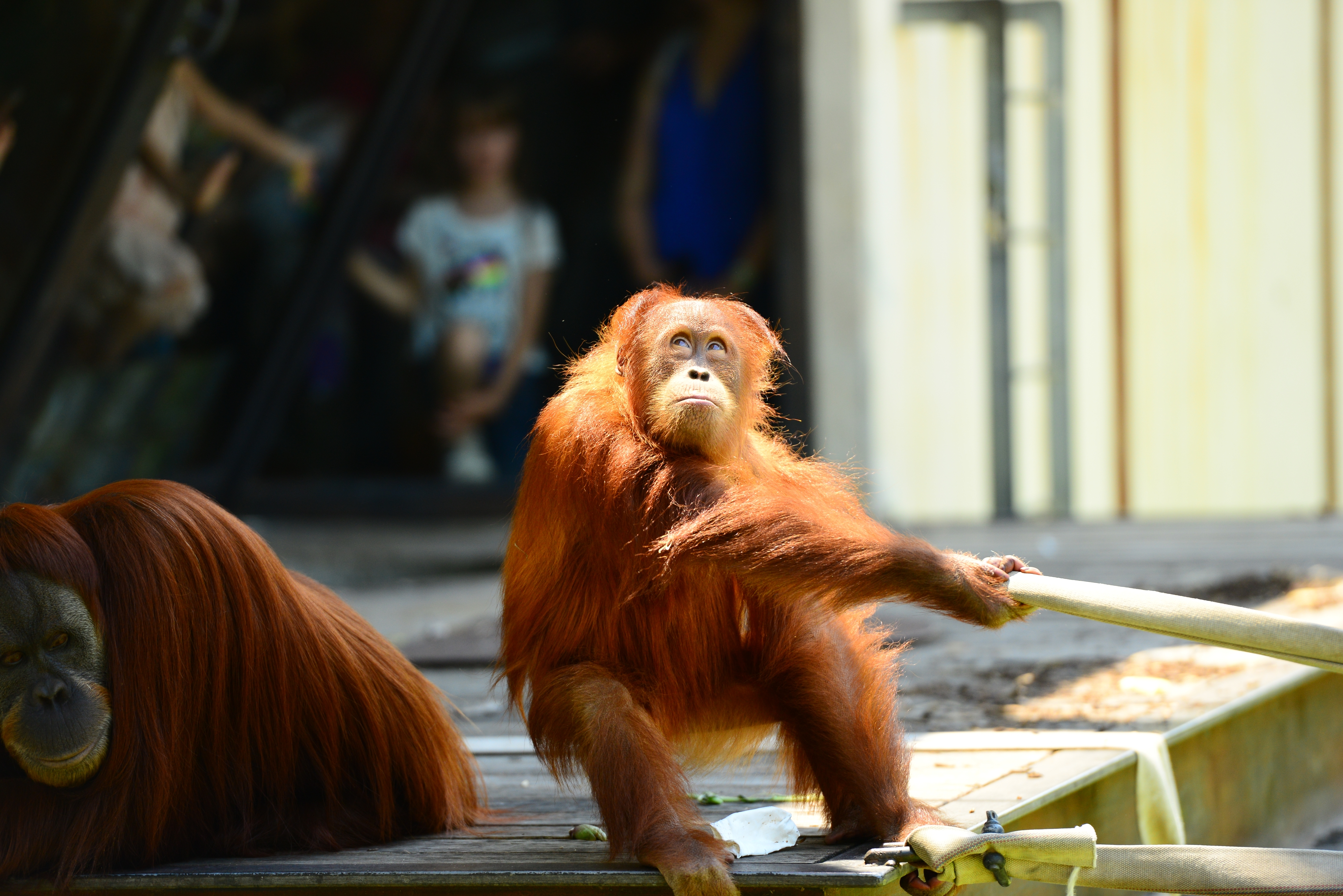
Sumatran orangutans

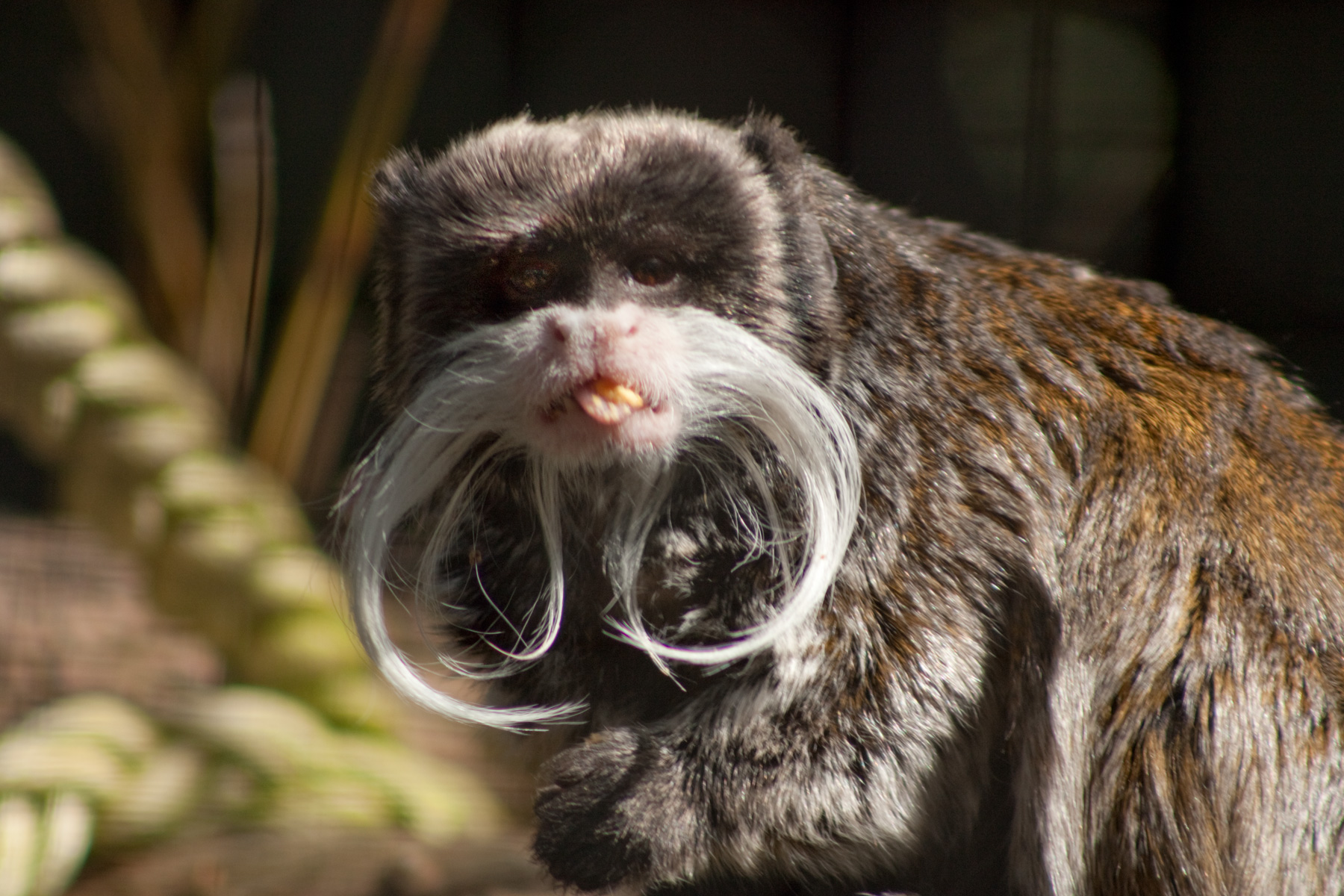
Emperor tamarin

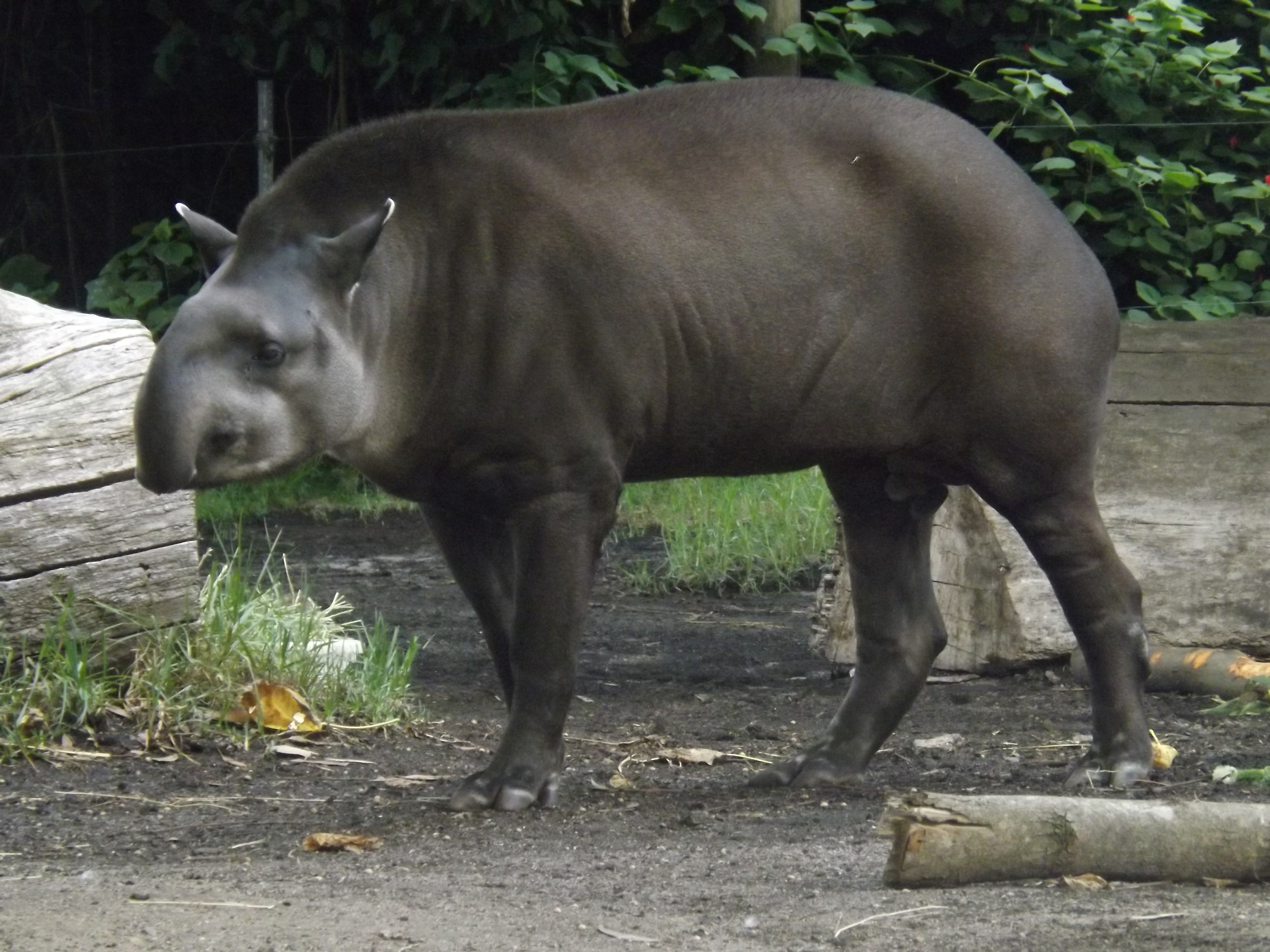
South American tapir

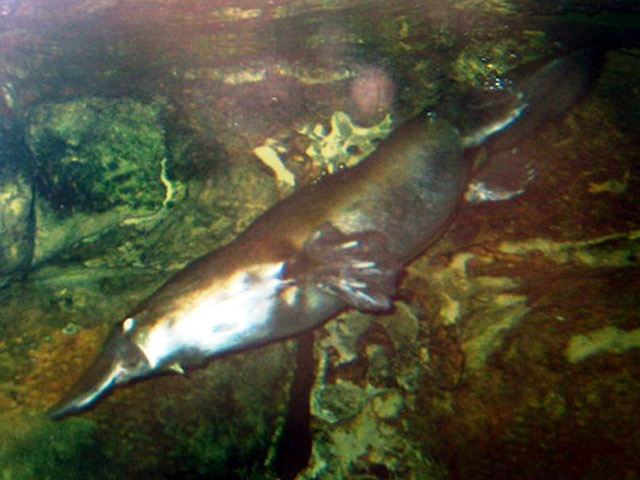
Platypus

== See also ==
- List of zoos in Australia
