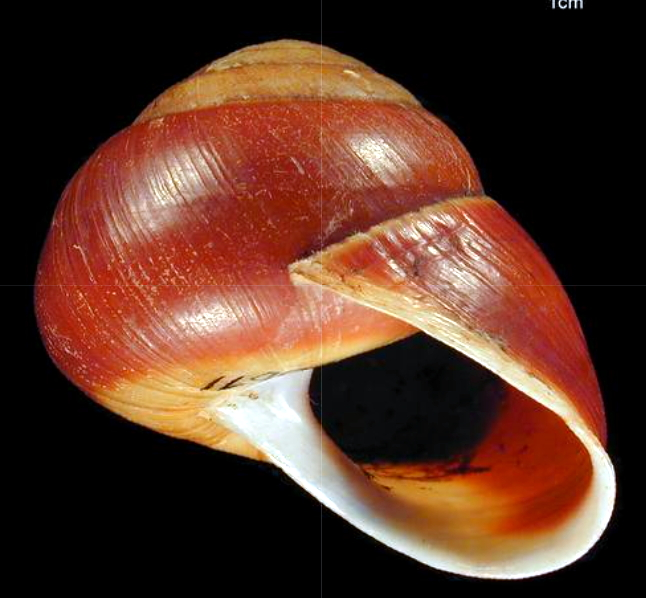
- Shell of Figuladra aureedensis (specimen in the Australian Museum)

Scientific classification
- Kingdom: Animalia
- Phylum: Mollusca
- Class: Gastropoda
- Order: Stylommatophora
- Family: Camaenidae
- Genus: Figuladra
- Species: F. aureedensis

Binomial name
- Figuladra aureedensis (Brazier, 1872)

Synonyms
- Helix (Camena) aureedensis ,Brazier, 1872; Varohadra aureedensis (Brazier, 1872).

= Figuladra aureedensis =

Species of snails

Figuladra aureedensis (common name - Fitzroy Caves banded snail) is a species of air-breathing land snail, terrestrial pulmonate gastropod mollusc in the family Camaenidae.

The species was first described in 1872 as Helix aureedensis by John Brazier. In 2024, Lorelle Stanisic, John Stanisic and Frank Köhler reassigned it to the genus Figuladra, to give the species name, Figuladra aureedensis.

The species epithet, aureedensis, which means "coming from Aureed (Island)", was a mistaken description since the specimen from which the species was described came from Johannsen's Caves, Mount Etna Caves National Park, in Queensland.

The species is endemic to Eastern Queensland, where it is found only in Mount Etna Caves National Park. It is considered to be at risk from fires, both natural and man-made.

== Description ==
(Original description) The shell is umbilicated and depressively globose, presenting as rather solid. Its surface is very finely obliquely striated, and, under magnification, appears finely granulated, colored dark chestnut. The suture is ornamented with a fine white thread, and a broad, dirty white, undefined zone encircles the umbilicus. The spire is broadly conoid and obtuse. The shell comprises 6 to 6.5 convex whorls; the five upper whorls are reddish chestnut, while the body whorl increases in size, becoming rounded and deflected in front. The base is convex. The aperture is diagonally ovately lunate, with a brownish-white interior. The peristome is straight, ivory-white, slightly thickened, and reflected. The margins approximate, with the right margin expanded and the columellar margin arcuate and reflexed, concealing nearly half of the deep umbilicus.
