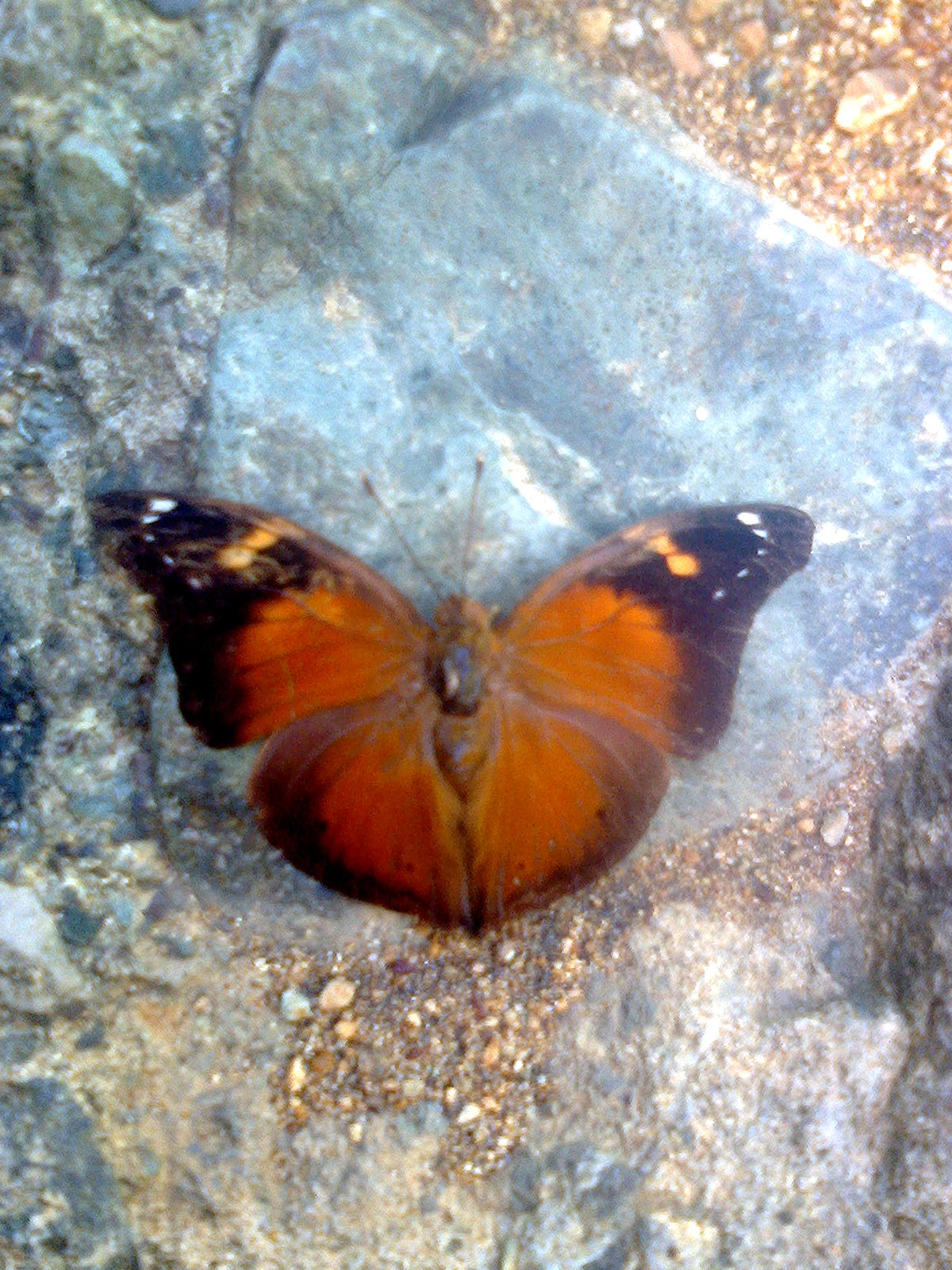
- D. p. celebensis male
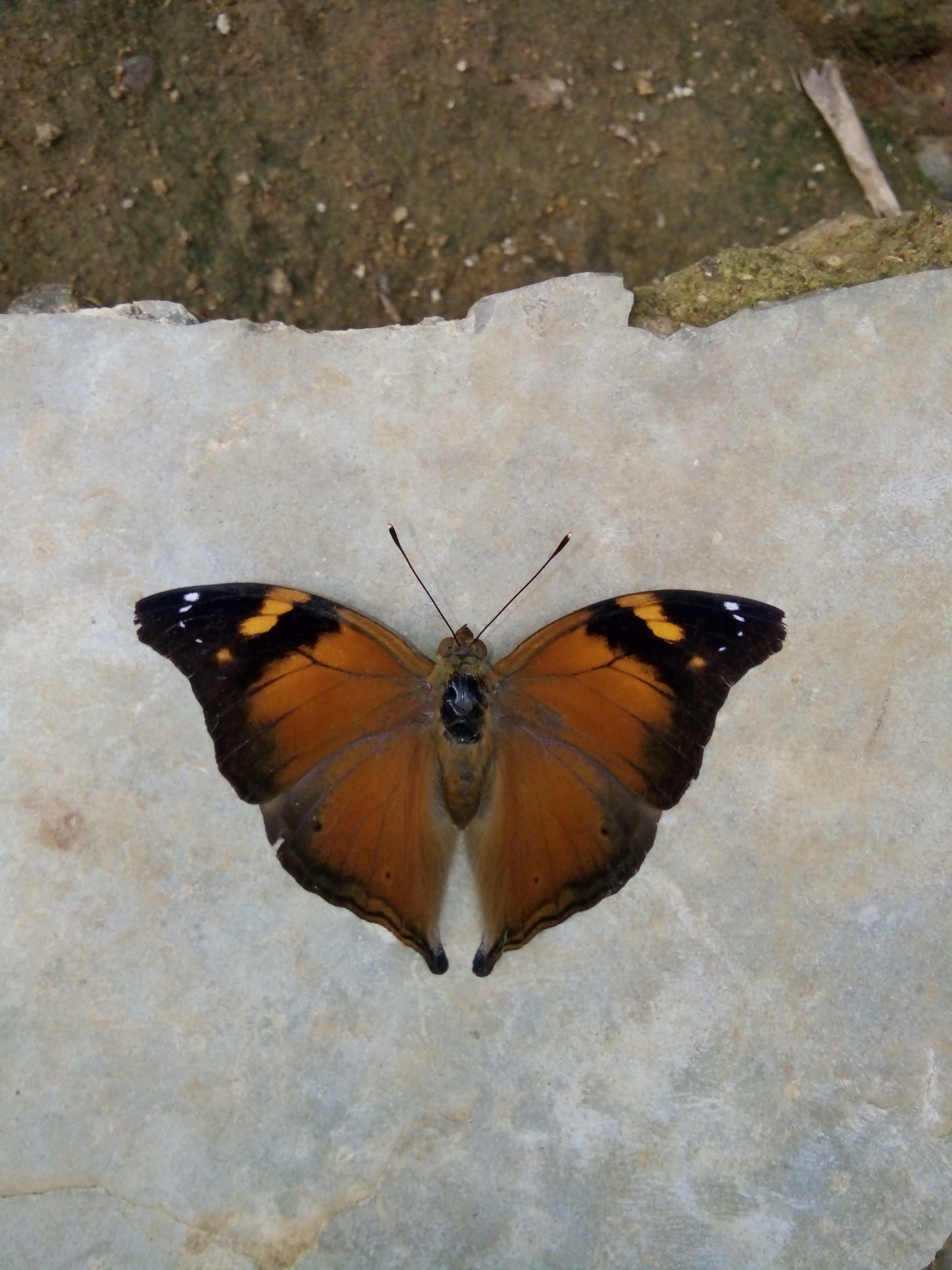
- D. p. celebensis female Both from Sungai Pontolo, North Gorontalo, Sulawesi

Scientific classification
- Domain: Eukaryota
- Kingdom: Animalia
- Phylum: Arthropoda
- Class: Insecta
- Order: Lepidoptera
- Family: Nymphalidae
- Genus: Doleschallia
- Species: D. polibete

Binomial name
- Doleschallia polibete (Cramer, [1779])

Synonyms
- Papilio polibete Cramer, [1779]; Doleschallia bisaltide celebensis Fruhstorfer, 1899; Doleschallia bisaltide sulaensis Fruhstorfer, 1899

= Doleschallia polibete =

Species of butterfly

Doleschallia polibete, the Australian leafwing, is a butterfly in the family Nymphalidae described by Pieter Cramer in 1779.

Larva have been found on plants of the genera Asystasia, Grapthyllum, Pseuderanthemum and Strobilanthes.

== Subspecies ==
- Doleschallia polibete celebensis Fruhstorfer, 1899 (Menado, Toli-Toli; Tombugu)
- Doleschallia polibete sulaensis Fruhstorfer, 1899 (Sula Islands)
- Doleschallia polibete maturitas Tsukada, 1985 (Banggai)
