= Figuladra =

Scientific classification
- Kingdom: Animalia
- Phylum: Mollusca
- Class: Gastropoda
- Order: Stylommatophora
- Family: Camaenidae
- Subfamily: Hadrinae
- Genus: Figuladra; Kohler & Bouchet, 2020

Genus of snails

Figuladra is a genus of air-breathing land snails, terrestrial pulmonate gastropod molluscs in the family Camaenidae.

The genus was first described in 2020 by Frank Kohler & Philippe Bouchet. The name had been published earlier by Tom Iredale, but he failed to give a valid description.

The type species is Helix incei L. Pfeiffer, 1846.

Snails in this genus are found only in Queensland.

== Species ==
Species listed as accepted by GBIF:

- Figuladra incei (L.Pfeiffer, 1846)
- Figuladra narelleae J.Stanisic & Potter, 2010
- Figuladra muirorum J.Stanisic, 2010
- Figuladra challisi (J.C.Cox, 1873)
- Figuladra pallida (Hedley & Musson, 1892)
- Figuladra reducta (Iredale, 1937)
- Figuladra appendiculata (Reeve, 1854)
- Figuladra bayensis (Brazier, 1876)
- Figuladra barneyae J.Stanisic, 2010

Additional species and subspecies accepted by the Australian Faunal Directory:

- Figuladra aureedensis Brazier, 1872
- Figuladra bromileyorum L. Stanisic, 2024
- Figuladra finlaysoni L. Stanisic, 2024
- Figuladra lessoni (Pfeiffer, 1846)
- Figuladra muirorum Stanisic, 2010
- Figuladra reducta (Iredale, 1937)
- Varohadra bayensis reducta Iredale, 1937
- Figuladra robertirwini L. Stanisic, 2024
- Figuladra vidulus L. Stanisic, 2024
