= Coggins =

Coggins or Coggin is a surname of Celtic origin specifically Wales, but can also be found in England, Ireland, Northern Ireland, and Scotland. The Coggins family lived in the parish of Cogan, which is in the diocese of Llandaff in the county of Glamorgan. The name literally means "a cup or bowl" and probably meant "dweller in a bowl-shaped valley."

Notable people with the surname include:

- Billy Coggins (1901–1958), English football player
- Cecil H. Coggins (1922–2019), American physician
- Claire Coggins (born 1985), American basketball player and coach
- Dave Coggin, former pitcher in Major League baseball
- Herbert L. Coggins (1881–1974), American editor and author
- Jacob Coggins (born 1978), American soccer player
- Jack Coggins (1911–2006), artist, author and illustrator
- Janet Coggin (1936–2010), British novelist and memoirist.
- Joan Coggin (1898–1980), English crime novelist.
- Jyles Coggins (1921–2011), American politician
- Leola Hall Coggins (1881–1930), American architect
- Mark Coggins (born 1957), Choctaw/American author and photographer
- Nate Coggins (born 1978), American football player
- Richard J. Coggins (1929–2017), British biblical commentator

== Fictional characters ==
- Lester Coggins, a character in the American television series Under the Dome
- George Coggins, Scrap Metal merchant in "Chitty Chitty Bang Bang" 1968 Musical Film - played by Desmond Llewelyn

== See also ==
- Coggin College of Business, part of the University of North Florida
- Coggins test, a diagnostic test for equine infectious anemia developed by Dr. Leroy Coggins
- Gilman Coggin House, a historic house in Massachusetts
- Coggins Boot Factory, Raunds, Northamptonshire
