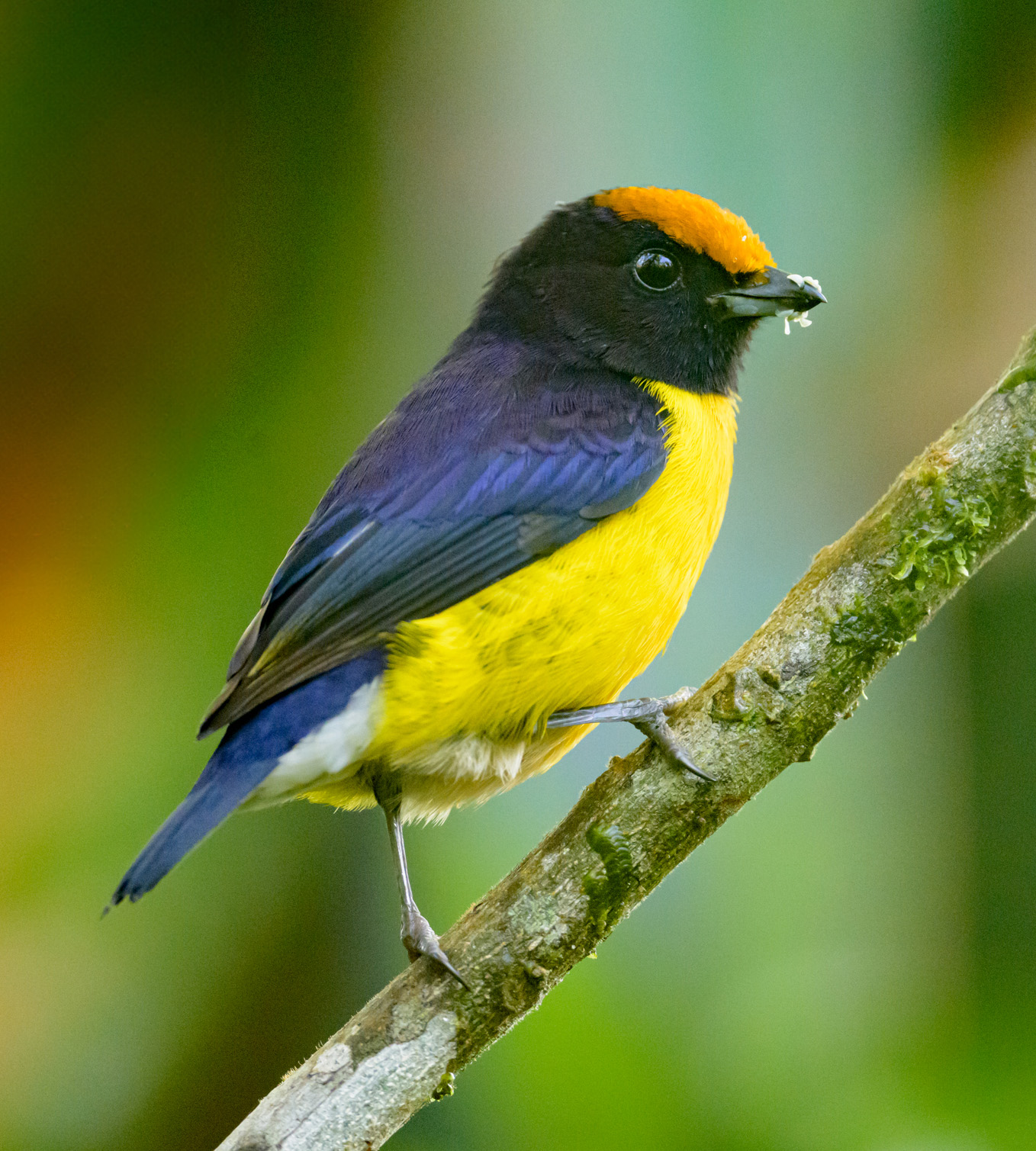

Conservation status
- Least Concern (IUCN 3.1)

Scientific classification
- Kingdom: Animalia
- Phylum: Chordata
- Class: Aves
- Order: Passeriformes
- Family: Fringillidae
- Subfamily: Euphoniinae
- Genus: Euphonia
- Species: E. anneae

Binomial name
- Euphonia anneae Cassin, 1865

= Tawny-capped euphonia =

Species of bird

The tawny-capped euphonia (Euphonia anneae) is a species of bird in the family Fringillidae, the finches and euphonias. It is found in Colombia, Costa Rica, and Panama.

== Taxonomy and systematics ==
The tawny-capped euphonia was originally described by John Cassin in 1865 with its current binomial Euphonia anneae (though spelled Euphonia Anneae). The specific epithet anneae honors the wife of Cassin's friend, the zoologist Daniel Giraud Elliot. At the time, the genus Euphonia was a member of the family Thraupidae, the "true" tanagers. Multiple studies in the late twentieth and early twenty-first centuries resulted in Euphonia being reassigned to its present place in the family Fringillidae. The tawny-capped euphonia and the orange-bellied euphonia (E. xanthogaster) form a superspecies.

The tawny-capped euphonia has two subspecies, the nominate E. a. anneae (Cassin, 1865) and E. a. rufiventrix (Salvin, 1866).

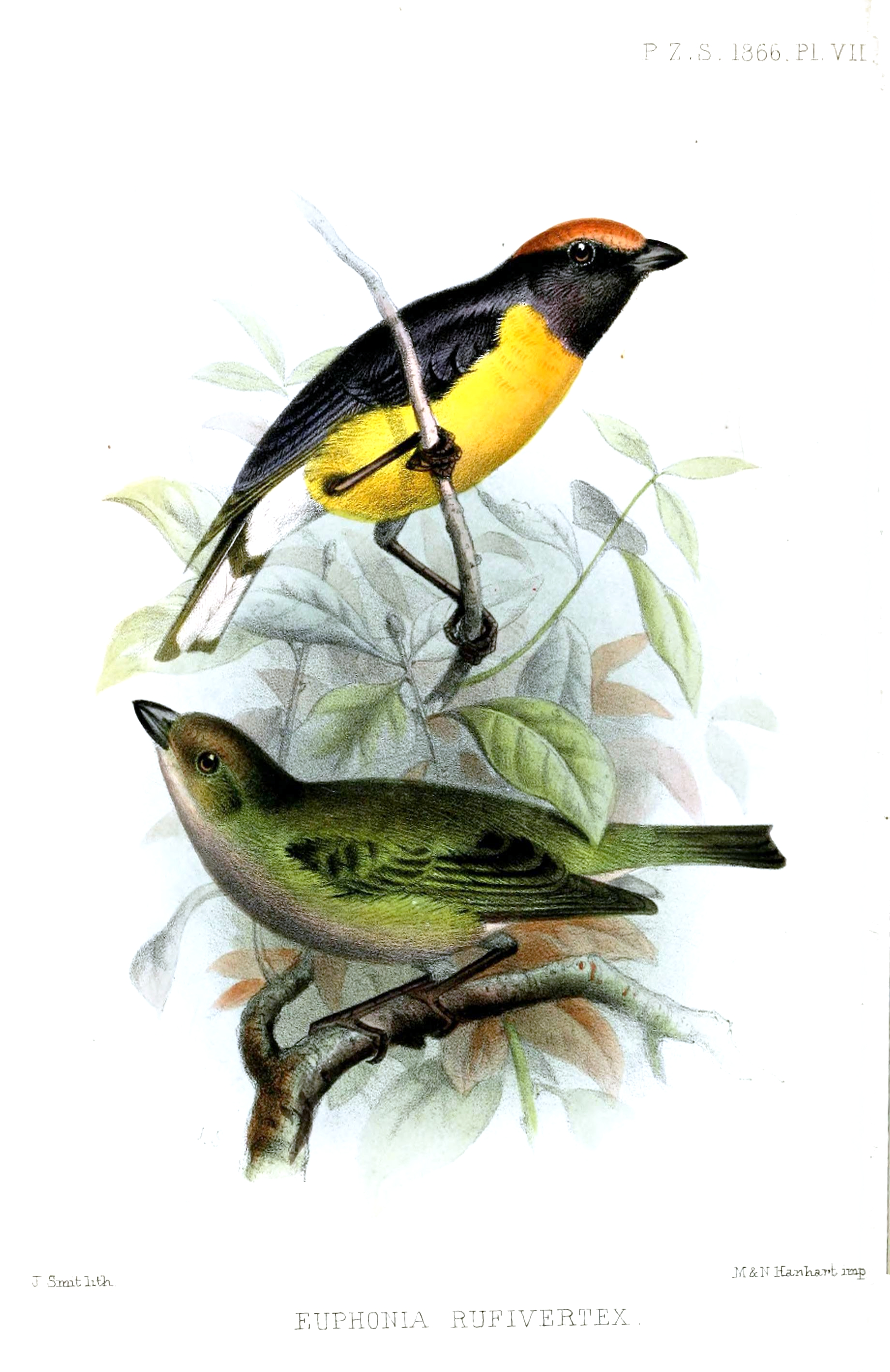
Illustration of a male and female

== Description ==
The tawny-cappeded euphonia is 10 to 11 cm (3.9 to 4.3 in) long and weighs about 15 g (0.53 oz). It is a small euphonia with a thick bill. The species is sexually dimorphic. Adult males of the nominate subspecies have a rich rufous-chestnut crown. The rest of their head and their nape, throat, upperwing coverts, and upperparts are glossy blue-black. Their flight feathers are dusky with dark blue edges and white inner webs at the base of most of them. The upper side of their tail is dark blue-black and the underside dark gray with white inner webs in the middle of the outer two or three pairs of feathers. The center of their lower belly and their undertail coverts are white and the rest of their underpart rich yellow. Adult females have a small dull rufous forehead. Their crown and nape are gray with olive sides on the crown and their face is yellowish with an olive tinge. Their upperparts and wing coverts are olive-green. Their primary coverts are a duskier olive-green and their flight feathers dusky with olive-yellow edges. Their tail is also dusky with olive-yellow feather edges. Their chin and the sides of their throat are yellowish with an olive tinge. The center of their throat and breast are gray to grayish white. Their sides are bright olive-yellow, their flanks yellowish, and their belly and undertail coverts buff to ochre. Subspecies E. a. rufiventrix is slightly smaller than the nominate. Males have more orange-tinged underparts than the nominate and females have deeper gray underparts and less yellowish flanks. Both sexes of both subspecies have a brown iris, a dusky blackish bill with a grayish base to the mandible, and horn-gray legs and feet.

== Distribution and habitat ==
The tawny-capped euphonia has a disjunct distribution. The nominate subspecies is the more northerly of the two. It is found in foothills on the Caribbean slope from Alajuela Province in northern Costa Rica south to Chiriquí Province in western Panama. Subspecies E. a. rufiventrix is found on the Caribbean and Pacific slopes from Veraguas Province in west-central Panama south very slightly into extreme northwestern Colombia in the area of Cerro Tacarcuna.

The tawny-capped euphonia inhabits the interior, edges, and clearings of tropical evergreen forest, montane forest, and secondary forest. In elevation it ranges between 400 and 1,700 m (1,300 and 5,600 ft) in Costa Rica and between 900 and 2,000 m (3,000 and 6,600 ft) in Panama. It reaches about 1,500 m (4,900 ft) in Colombia.

== Behavior ==
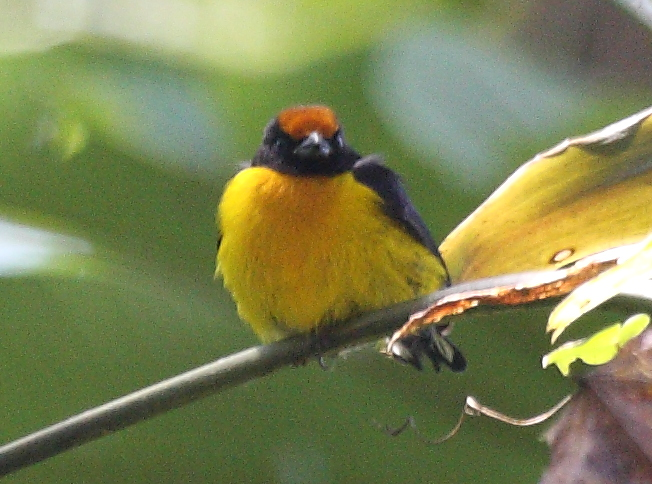

=== Movement ===
The tawny-capped euphonia is generally a year-round resident, though it makes some elevational movements between the seasons.

=== Feeding ===
The tawny-capped euphonia feeds primarily on small fruits, and also includes smaller amounts of insects in its diet. It mostly forages in pairs and in small groups, and less often singly. It often joins mixed-species feeding flocks. In the forest it forages primarily from the mid-level to the canopy but often down to the shrub layer in clearings and on edges.

=== Breeding ===
The tawny-capped euphonia is believed to breed between March and June in Costa Rica; its season in Panama includes May. Its nest is a globe with a side entrance made from moss and plant fibers. It is typically placed in a clump of moss or epiphytes or within a vine tangle on a branch. Nests have been found between about 8 and 11 m (25 and 35 ft) above the ground. The clutch size, incubation period, time to fledging, and details of parental care are not known.

=== Vocalization ===
The tawny-capped euphonia's "[u]nmusical utterances are harsh and nasal". In more detail, its song is "a note or phrase repeated 2–4 times before changing, e.g. whee whee whee, wheer wheer, nah-a-a-ak, nah-a-a-ak, eeeenk eeenk eeenk, seeet seeet... and so on".

== Status ==
The IUCN has assessed the tawny-capped euphonia as being of Least Concern. It has a large range; its estimated population of at least 50,000 mature individuals is believed to be decreasing. No immediate threats have been identified. It is considered common in Costa Rica and "apparently local and less numerous in Panama". It occurs in protected areas in all three countries of its range. "Although deforestation within its range is extensive and ongoing, some large tracts of intact forest remain locally, although unprotected, these are likely to provide a buffer against near-term risk."
