= Clan Barrett =

Irish clan

Clan Barrett Clann Bairéad (Irish)
- Irish clan
- Origin: Duchy of Normandy
- Members: Riocard Bairéad; Tomás Bairéad
- Motto: Frangas non Flectes: virtus probitas (You may break [me] but will not bend [me]: Power and integrity)
- Cadet branches: List: MacAndrew; MacEvilly / Mac an Mhileadha; MacPadine; MacWattin

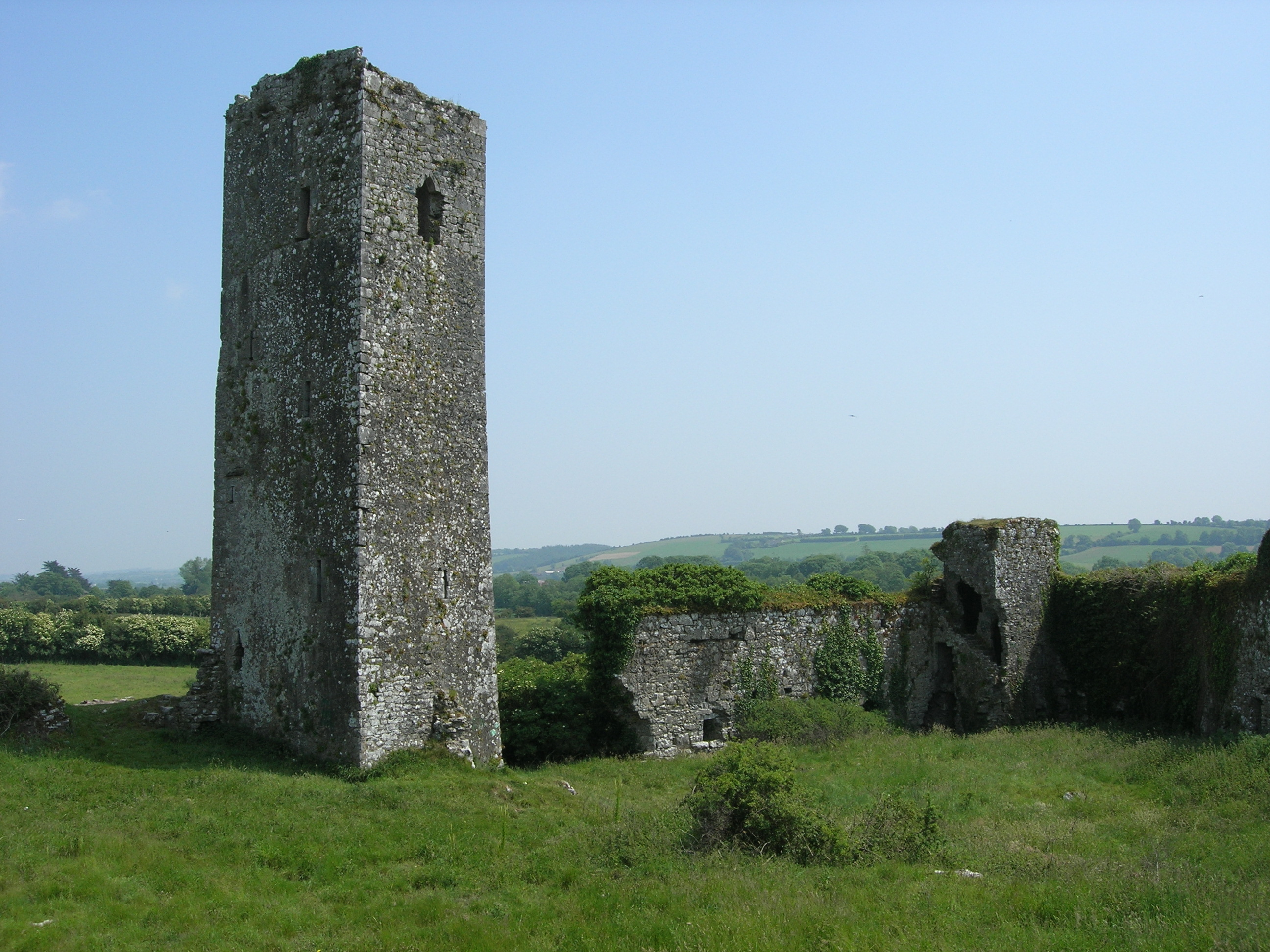
Ballincollig Castle was inhabited by the Barretts after they purchased Sir Robert Coll's estate lands at Ballincollig in 1468.

Clan Barrett (Irish: Clann Bairéad) is an Irish clan from County Cork that originally descended from Normans who came to Ireland with Strongbow in the 12th century. They are related to the ancestors of the Clan Barrett of County Mayo, who until recently were otherwise considered Gaelic in origin. Of the two, the Cork branch was considered numerically stronger, while the Mayo-Galway branch held more prominence in the Middle Ages.

The Barrett family gained influence and power through the centuries for services to various kings and nobles, such as in the 14th century when they served as underlords to the de Cogan family, and later when one John Barrett fought in the First War of Scottish Independence for the Crown.

== Name ==
There are numerous suggested origins for the surname Barrett. The chief source is the first name that has the form Berault or Beraud (or Baraud) in French, and means 'bear power'. It is closely associated in derivation with Bernard, meaning 'firm bear'. It has also been suggested that Barneveld, a name from the Middle Ages with the significance of 'bear-headed', is associated with Barrett.

In modern times, the name has various spellings, including Barrett, Barret, Barratt, Bairead, Baireid and Baroid. Archaically, Barat and Baret were also used.

=== Two clans theory ===
There are two Barrett clans in Ireland which arrived in Ireland at the same time; one group is the Munster Barrett family of Cork, and the other is the Barrett family of Connacht, most numerous in the mountainous areas of Mayo and Galway. The founders of the two clans were believed to be unrelated, with the similarity of their names being thought purely coincidental before recent research proved otherwise. The English pipe rolls of the 13th century indicate that the overlords of both the Cork and the Mayo-Galway Barretts were the same people, and the records further indicate that both families migrated from Pendyne County, Wales. The view prevailed that the Barretts of Cork derived their name from the Norman-French Barratt (Baroid), while the Barretts of Connacht derived their name from the Gaelic name Baireid, or Bairéad which means 'quarrelsome' or 'warlike'. O'Donovan wrote that both families were descended from Welsh lines.

== History ==
The Barrett clan descend from Cambro-Normans who settled in Pendine. Beginning in 1169, the Barretts migrated from Pembrokeshire to Ireland during the Norman Invasion of Ireland as hired Welsh mercenaries for the Norman warlord Richard de Clare, 2nd Earl of Pembroke.

In 1236, Barretts travelled to Connacht with John de Cogan's Munster contingent, which seemingly made them tenants of the de Cogans' lands at Carrigrohane. Both families living in Connacht and Munster were fully assimilated into Irish culture and married into many old Irish families; they are said to have become "more Irish than the Irish themselves". Barretts Country, in the approximate centre of Cork, would come to be named after them.

Around the turn of the 14th century, John Barrett was pardoned Crown debts and rents by King Edward II in return for services during the First War of Scottish Independence. The debts otherwise would have been chargeable to Barrett's son William. Batin (or Wattin) Barrett also lived circa 1300. The Chief Barrett of Tirawley was for centuries known by the Gaelic name Mac Baitín, or Mac Wattin, which eventually evolved into Mac Páidín, or Mac Padine. This is the source of the Padden surname found in Mayo today. To this day, the Barretts and Barrys of Connacht are known as "Welshmen of Tirawley".

By 1468 the Barretts had purchased Sir Robert Coll's estate lands at Ballincollig, extending and improving the site of Ballincollig Castle. In 1485, among other Welsh and Irish mercenaries, troops from the Barretts of Cork were hired and knighted by King Henry VII to fight in the Battle of Bosworth Field. According to legend, the accompanying clans rode 'swift Irish ponies' and overtook the opposing army's heavily armoured knights. After the battle was won, the King led the remaining forces back to Pembroke.

By 1600 the Barretts had lost Ballincollig Castle due to infighting, with Sir Walter Coppinger gaining full ownership of the lands in 1630. By October 1601, the Barrett family acquired Castlemore (or Castle More; later called Castle Barrett), which had previously been owned by the Earl of Desmond. According to one Dr. Smith, it is said that Hugh O'Neill, Earl of Tyrone when marching to Kinsale asked who lived in the castle, and upon being told that the owner was a Barret, described as a 'good Catholic' whose ancient English family had owned the estate in Barretts Country for just over 400 years, the Earl swore in Irish: "No matter, I hate the English churl, as if he came but yesterday." The castle was damaged in 1645 by Oliver Cromwell's army. After the Battle of the Boyne in 1690, where Colonel John Barrett fighting on the side of the Jacobites lost to the Williamites, Castle Barrett was destroyed and 12,000 acres of Barrett land was forfeited.

The first of the name in the United States was James Barrett, who landed in Charlestown, Massachusetts in about 1643. His home eventually was Malden, Massachusetts. His son, James, was in a troop of horse in King Philip's War. Another member of the family, James Barrett, was a colonel in the Lexington Alarm in 1775.

== Coat of arms ==
The blazon of the Barrett coat of arms is: Barry of ten per pale argent and gules counterchanged; The crest is: A demi-lion rampant sable, ducally crowned per pale argent and gules. In layman's terms, this means that the shield is divided vertically into two halves, both halves striped horizontally red and white, with the colour changing at the mid point; while the crest is a black half-lion crowned with a red-and-white ducal coronet.

The clan motto is: "Frangas non flectes: virtus probitas", whose meaning is commonly given as "unbowed, unbroken honor and courage".

== See also ==
- Barrett family of Jamaica
