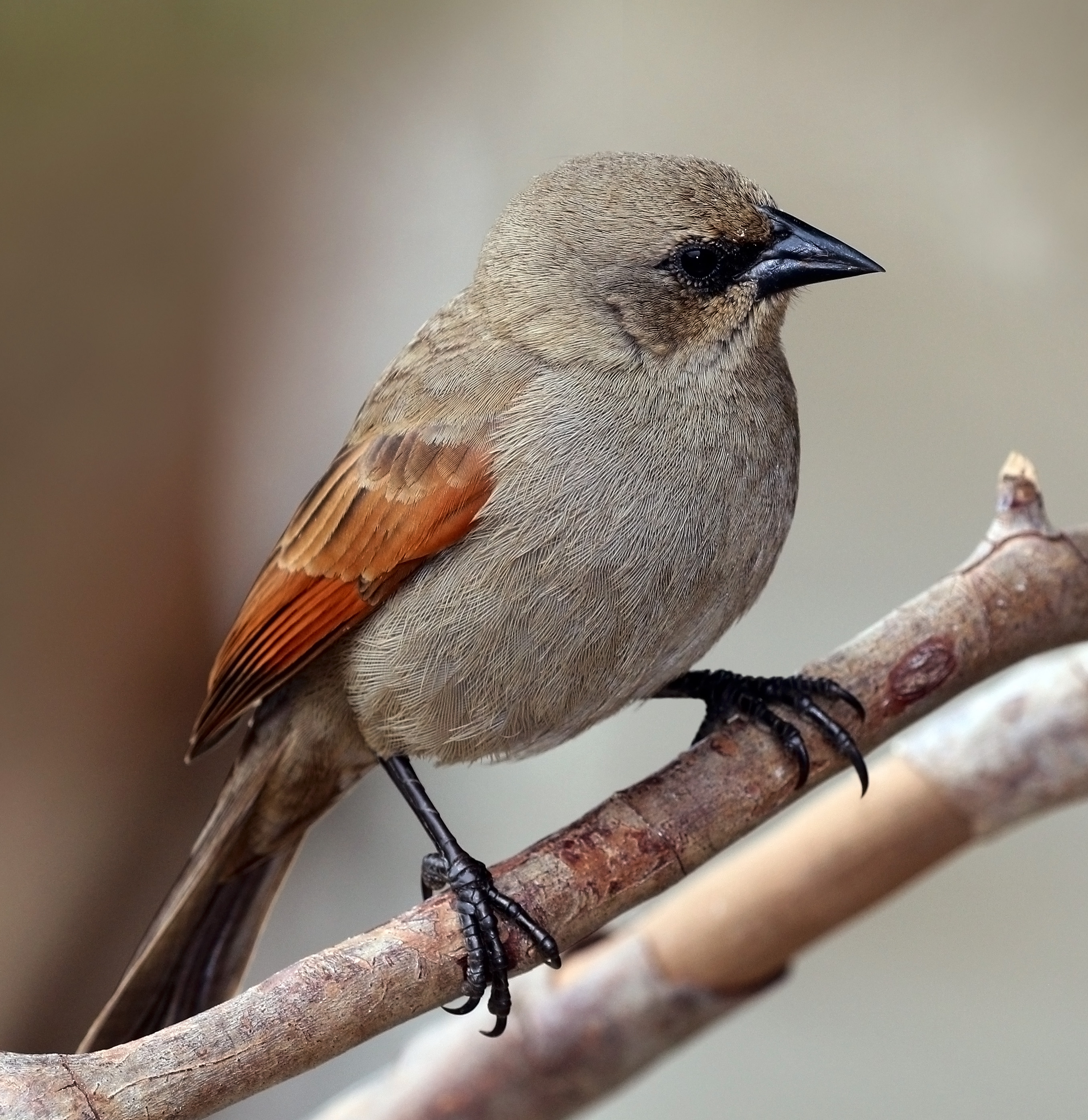
- Greyish baywing, Agelaioides badius, Pantanal, Brazil

Scientific classification
- Kingdom: Animalia
- Phylum: Chordata
- Class: Aves
- Order: Passeriformes
- Family: Icteridae
- Genus: Agelaioides; Cassin, 1866

Type species
- Agelaius badius Vieillot, 1819

Species
- Agelaioides badius; Agelaioides fringillarius

= Baywing =

Genus of birds

The baywings are two species of birds in the genus Agelaioides, which were described in the early 19th century. These species are found in Brazil and in the case of A. badius, also Argentina, Bolivia, Uruguay, and Paraguay. They were formerly in included in genus Molothrus with cowbirds.

== Species ==
Genus Agelaioides – Cassin, 1866 – two species
Common name	Scientific name and subspecies	Range	Size and ecology	IUCN status and estimated population
Grayish baywing	Agelaioides badius (Vieillot, 1819)	Argentina, Bolivia, Uruguay, Paraguay and southern and central Brazil	Size: Habitat: Diet:	LC
Pale baywing	Agelaioides fringillarius (von Spix, 1824)	north-eastern Brazil.	Size: Habitat: Diet:	LC
