= Herbert L. Coggins =

American writer

- Born: May 31, 1881
- Died: December 1974 (aged 93)
- Other name: Curly
- Occupations: Editor, author
- Spouse: Leola Hall (m. 1912; died 1930) Elsie Shirpser (died 1973)
- Relatives: Passmore Williamson (great uncle)
- Writing career
- Language: English
- Period: 1906–1959
- Subjects: Children's literature, educational, ornithology, humor

Herbert Leonard Coggins (1881–1974) was an American editor and author of humorous pieces for magazines like The Atlantic Monthly as well as a handful of children's books. He also lectured on ornithology and ran for a various California political offices on the Socialist ticket. His first wife was East Bay architect Leola Hall.

== Early life and education ==
Herbert Leonard "Curly" Coggins was born May 31, 1881, to Paschal H. and Caroline (Leonard) Coggins and grew up in Massachusetts and Pennsylvania. His father was a lawyer who also wrote novels and stories for magazines like The Saturday Evening Post and The Atlantic Monthly, and his mother was active in the women's suffrage movement. He had a brother, Curtis W., and three sisters, Alice, Anna, and Edith I. His grandfather Paschal Coggins had been an editor of the Sacramento Union newspaper and a member of the state legislature. His great-uncle was the abolitionist businessman Passmore Williamson.

In his high school years, Coggins met the ornithologist Witmer Stone, then curator of the Philadelphia Academy of Natural Sciences (ANS), which sparked a lifelong interest in ornithology. He joined the Audubon Society at the age of sixteen and gained much of his ornithological expertise on field trips with members of the society and other bird-watching clubs. As soon as he was old enough to do so, he joined the ANS, and he served as secretary of the Delaware Valley Ornithological Club. He would later join the American Ornithologists' Union, and serve as president of the Cooper Ornithological Club on the West Coast.

In 1900, Coggins served as an assistant teacher in an ornithology course in Woods Hole, Massachusetts.

Coggins briefly studied bookkeeping at a business college in Philadelphia.

== Career as editor ==
Coggins's first job was as an errand boy and later manuscript reader for Penn Publishing Company, which put out the Horatio Alger and Betty Wales series of books for children. Around 1900, Coggins was promoted to running a children's magazine, Youth, which published poems (including an early one by Sinclair Lewis), short stories (including one by Lucy Maud Montgomery), and serialized versions of some of the company's books.

After a few years, Coggins left and moved to San Francisco, California, shortly after the 1906 earthquake. There he got a job with Whitaker and Ray, a small-scale distributor of educational books and school supplies. As the editor in charge of their publishing department, he oversaw projects like issuing a set of lectures that Theodore Roosevelt had recently given in the Bay Area. Realizing that the firm was economically precarious, he left around 1912.

== Career as lecturer and writer ==
Not long after Coggins arrived in California, he started giving talks on ornithology and continued to do so intermittently throughout the rest of his life. For one series of lectures at the University of California, he focused on economic ornithology, or the monetary value of birds to human culture. He also contributed to Cassinia, the journal of the Delaware Valley Ornithological Club.

Coggins had a lively sense of humor; as Witmer Stone put it, he had "the gift of looking at a thing from all sides and he generally took his final stand on the comical side and the worst of it was, things that others looked upon as serious looked comical to him and it was often hard to prove that he was wrong." Coggins wrote for The Atlantic Monthly, Collier's, and Vogue magazines, and some of his pieces for The Atlantic Monthly include humorous writing on such subjects as "how to catch burglars (in a bag) and how to enjoy paying taxes". For Collier's, he started a humorous series featuring animal protagonists, one of which—centered on a beaver—was turned into the children's book Busby & Co. (1952). Coggins wrote other books for children, including I Am a Mouse (1959).

== Political campaigns ==
In 1913 and again a few years later, Coggins ran as the Socialist Party of America's candidate for mayor of Berkeley, losing both times.

In 1917, he ran unsuccessfully as a Socialist for a seat on the Berkeley City Council.

In 1924, he ran as a Socialist for a California seat in the U.S. House of Representatives, gaining only 8% of the vote in a contest won by Republican Albert E. Carter.

== Other businesses and personal life ==
On June 11, 1912, Coggins married East Bay architect Leola Hall, settling down with her in a house she built for them, now known as "Honeymoon House". During this period, he first took over his father-in-law's cement contracting company, which he ran with Leola. As the post-earthquake building boom tapered off around 1914, he bought a stationery store and engraving business in Oakland. In the 1920s, he became a director and later the president of Patterson Parts, a San Francisco auto parts firm that had been founded by a fellow Socialist. He held this position for many decades.

Some years after Leola's death in 1930, Coggins remarried; his second wife, Elsie (Shirpser) Coggins, had been his assistant at Ray and Whitaker many years earlier. Coggins died in December, 1974, a year after his wife.

== Books ==
- I Am a Mouse (1959; illustrations by Judith Brook)
- Busby & Co. (1952)
- Choosing a Reason for War (1941)
- Home Games (1938=9)
- Stories Worth Telling (1909)
- Knick Knacks (1906; illustrated by Clare Victor Dwiggins)
