= Hilder =

Hilder is a surname. Notable people with the surname include:

- Alan Hilder (1901–1970), English cricketer
- Anthony J. Hilder, American film maker, conspiracy expert and radio host
- Geoffrey Hilder (1908-1988), Anglican clergyman
- J J Hilder (1881–1916), Australian Watercolourist
- Matt Hilder (born 1982), Australian rugby league footballer
- Raymond Hilder (born 1966), Australian Software developer and clergy.
- Robert Hilder (1949–2017), Third Judicial District Court Judge in the U.S. state of Utah
- Rowland Hilder (1905–1993), English marine and landscape artist and book illustrator
