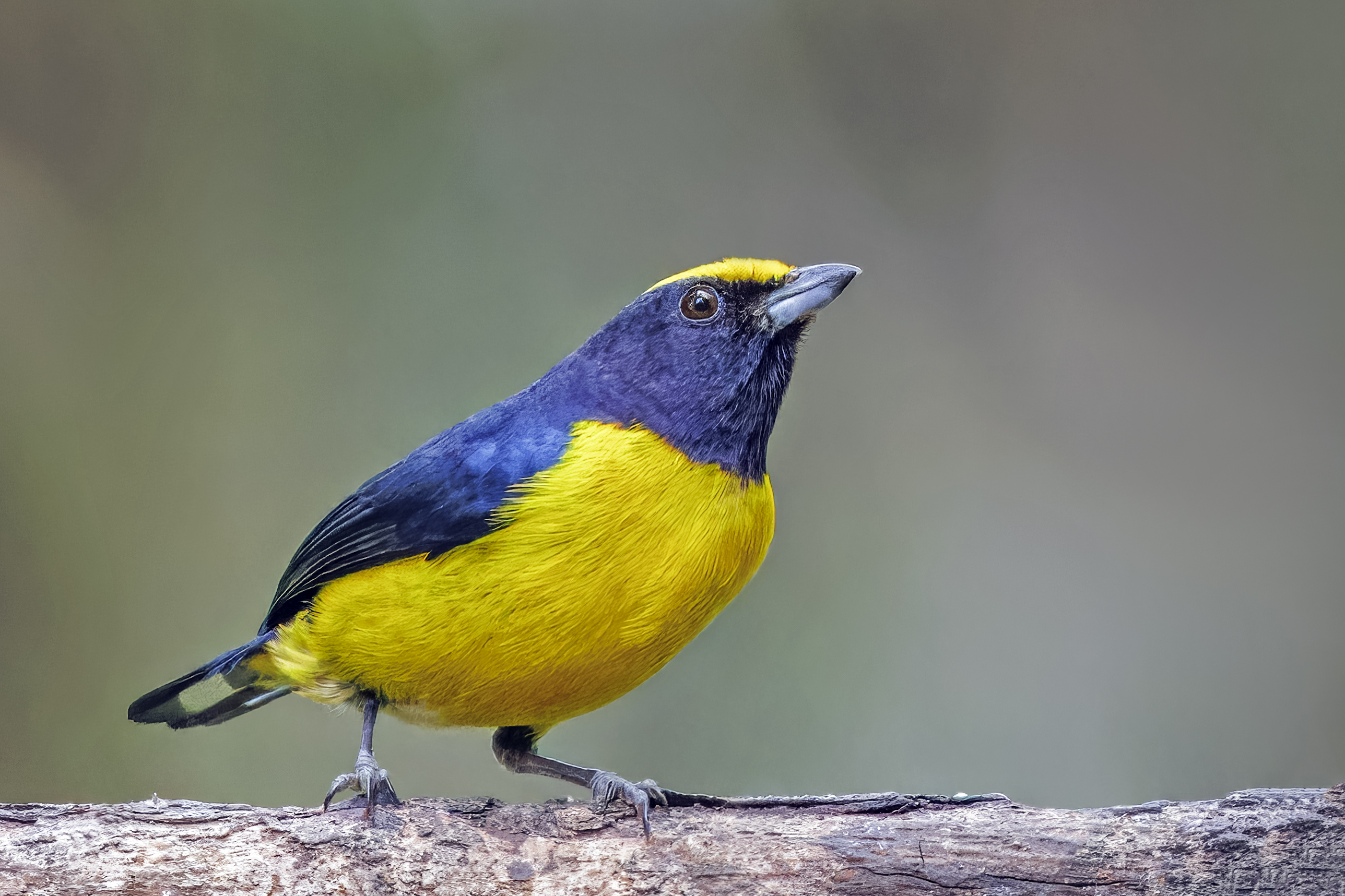
- E. x. quitensis, Ecuador

Conservation status
- Least Concern (IUCN 3.1)

Scientific classification
- Kingdom: Animalia
- Phylum: Chordata
- Class: Aves
- Order: Passeriformes
- Family: Fringillidae
- Subfamily: Euphoniinae
- Genus: Euphonia
- Species: E. xanthogaster

Binomial name
- Euphonia xanthogaster Sundevall, 1834

= Orange-bellied euphonia =

Species of bird

The orange-bellied euphonia (Euphonia xanthogaster) is a species of bird in the family Fringillidae, the finches and euphonias. It is found in Bolivia, Brazil, Colombia, Ecuador, Guyana, Panama, Peru, and Venezuela.

== Taxonomy and systematics ==
The orange-bellied euphonia was originally described in 1834 with the binomial E[uphone] xanthogaster. At the time, the genus Euphonia was a member of the family Thraupidae, the "true" tanagers. Multiple studies in the late twentieth and early twenty-first centuries resulted in Euphonia being reassigned to its present place in the family Fringillidae.

The orange-bellied euphonia has these 11 subspecies:

- E. x. oressinoma Olson, 1981
- E. x. chocoensis Hellmayr, 1911
- E. x. badissima Olson, 1981
- E. x. quitensis (Nelson, 1912)
- E. x. dilutior (Zimmer, JT, 1943)
- E. x. cyanonota Parkes, 1969
- E. x. brunneifrons Chapman, 1901
- E. x. ruficeps d'Orbigny & Lafresnaye, 1837
- E. x. brevirostris Bonaparte, 1851
- E. x. exsul Berlepsch, 1912
- E. x. xanthogaster Sundevall, 1834

The orange-bellied euphonia and the tawny-capped euphonia (E. anneae) form a superspecies. The "black-throated euphonia" ("Euphonia vittata") was originally described as a species but is now believed to be a hybrid between the orange-bellied euphonia and the chestnut-bellied euphonia (E. pectoralis).

== Description ==
The orange-bellied euphonia is 9 to 11 cm (3.5 to 4.3 in) long and weighs 9 to 16 g (0.32 to 0.56 oz). It has a thick stubby bill. The species is sexually dimorphic. Adult males of the nominate subspecies E. x. xanthogaster have a deep yellow forehead; the patch extends to well beyond the eye. The rest of their head and their nape are glossy blackish. Their upperparts, wing coverts, and flight feathers are glossy blue-black. The upper side of their tail is blue-black and the underside gray with white inner webs on the outer two to three pairs of feathers. Their throat is purplish black. Their underparts are yellow with an inconspicuous ochre tinge on the belly. Adult females have an olive-yellow forecrown, an olive mid-crown, and a gray hindcrown and nape. The rest of their face is olive. Their upperparts are mostly olive with olive to dusky upperwing coverts. Their primary coverts are dusky. Their flight feathers and tail are dusky with olive feather edges. Their throat, chest, and the middle of their breast are gray. Their sides and flanks are olive to olive-yellow and their belly and undertail coverts buff-tinged gray.

The other subspecies of the orange-breasted euphonia differ from the nominate and each other thus:

- E. x. oressinoma: larger than nominate but otherwise much the same
- E. x. chocoensis: smaller than nominate; male has faint ochraceous tinge on underparts
- E. x. badissima: male has dark chestnut forehead and dark fulvous underparts; female has darkish chestnut forecrown
- E. x. quitensis: male has larger yellow forehead and darker ochraceous underparts than nominate
- E. x. dilutior: male is paler yellow than nominate; female has grayer breast
- E. x. cyanonota: male has smaller yellow forehead than nominate and steel-blue upperparts
- E. x. brunneifrons: male has rufous forehead and ochraceous yellow underparts
- E. x. ruficeps: male has dark chestnut forehead and medium fulvous underparts
- E. x. brevirostris: male has darker more ochraceous forehead and underparts than nominate
- E. x. exsul: male has rich orangish chestnut forehead and deep fulvous breast and belly center; female has chestnut-tinged forecrown and rich buff underparts

Both sexes of all subspecies have a brown iris, a black maxilla, a blue-gray mandible with a dark tip, and dark gray legs and feet.

== Distribution and habitat ==
The orange-bellied euphonia has a disjunct distribution, though the ranges of some subspecies are contiguous. The subspecies are found thus:

- E. x. oressinoma: Colombia's Western and Central Andes
- E. x. chocoensis: from extreme eastern Panama south on the Pacific slope of the Andes through Colombia into northwestern Ecuador's Esmeraldas and Imbabura provinces
- E. x. badissima: Serranía del Perijá on the Colombia-Venezuela border; Venezuelan Andes from Lara state southwest and into northeastern Colombia
- E. x. quitensis: from Pichincha Province in western Ecuador south just into northwestern Peru's Tumbes Department
- E. x. dilutior: from southeastern Colombia into northeastern Peru's Ucayali River valley
- E. x. cyanonota: central Amazonian Brazil south of the Amazon between the Juruá and Tapajós rivers
- E. x. brunneifrons: southeastern Peru's Cuzco and Puno departments
- E. x. ruficeps: west-central Bolivia's La Paz and Cochabamba departments
- E. x. brevirostris: eastern Colombia's Magdalena River valley and east of the Eastern Andes from Norte de Santander Department south through eastern Ecuador and eastern Peru; from there east across most of southern Venezuela into central Guyana and northwestern Brazil to the Uaupés River
- E. x. exsul: Venezuelan Coastal Ranges from Carabobo state east to Miranda state
- E. x. xanthogaster: coastal eastern Brazil from central Bahia south to central Rio de Janeiro state

The orange-bellied euphonia generally inhabits humid to wet evergreen forest where it occurs in the canopy and edges and in clearings and natural gaps that have some trees. In the Andes it ranges from foothill forest up to montane cloudforest and also occurs in shady plantations. In the Amazon Basin it inhabits both várzea and terra firme forest. Overall it ranges in elevation mostly from sea level to 2,300 m (7,500 ft). It reaches 2,500 m (8,200 ft) in Colombia, 2,000 m (6,600 ft) in Ecuador, 2,450 m (8,000 ft) in Peru, 2,250 m (7,400 ft) in Venezuela, and 1,100 m (3,600 ft) in Brazil.

== Behavior ==
=== Movement ===
The orange-bellied euphonia is a year-round resident, though some minor elevational movements have been recorded.

=== Feeding ===
The orange-bellied euphonia feeds primarily on small fruits, and also includes smaller amounts of arthropods in its diet. It mostly forages in pairs and regularly joins mixed-species feeding flocks. It also shares fruiting trees with other species. In the forest it forages primarily from the mid-level to the canopy but often down to the shrub layer in clearings and on edges.

=== Breeding ===
The orange-bellied euphonia's breeding seasons have not been fully defined. However, in northern Colombia it includes May to July, in western Colombia November to April, in Ecuador February and March, and Peru November. Its nest is a domed enclosure with a side entrance made from grass and moss. The clutch size, incubation period, time to fledging, and details of parental care are not known.

=== Vocalization ===
The orange-bellied euphonia's song has some regional differences but their significance has not been studied. In Ecuador it has been described as "a variable, almost random-sounding, series of semimusical phrases given in a leisurely manner" and its calls as "a clear ding-ding-ding, a chee!, an upslurred kueé, and a more gravely cheeur-cheeur". From Colombia and Venezuela its song has been written as "a rambling disconnected deeu deeu...deet deet deet... jew jew... chu chu chu...jew, ju-du-du-du... and so on".

== Status ==
The IUCN has assessed the orange-bellied euphonia as being of Least Concern. It has a large range; its estimated population of at least five million mature individuals is believed to be decreasing. No immediate threats have been identified. It is considered common in Colombia, "the most widespread Ecuadorian euphonia in humid regions", the "most common, widespread" euphonia in Peru, common in Venezuela, and "common to frequent" in Brazil. The species "[o]ccurs in many protected areas; found also in many unprotected sites that appear not to be at risk, at least in the short term. [The] [i]solated nominate race in SE Brazil occurs in a region now heavily deforested; this population should be monitored closely."
