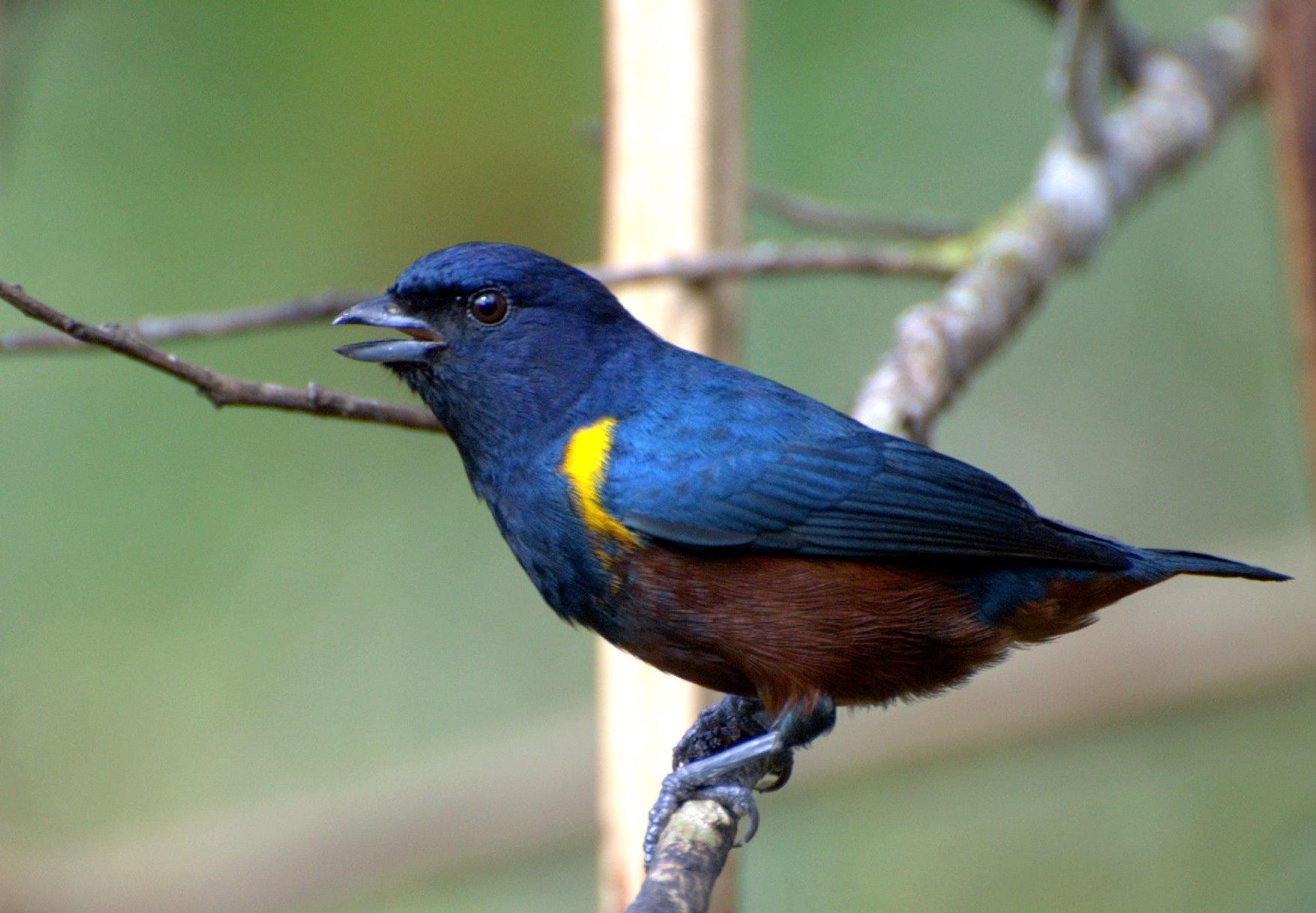
- Male
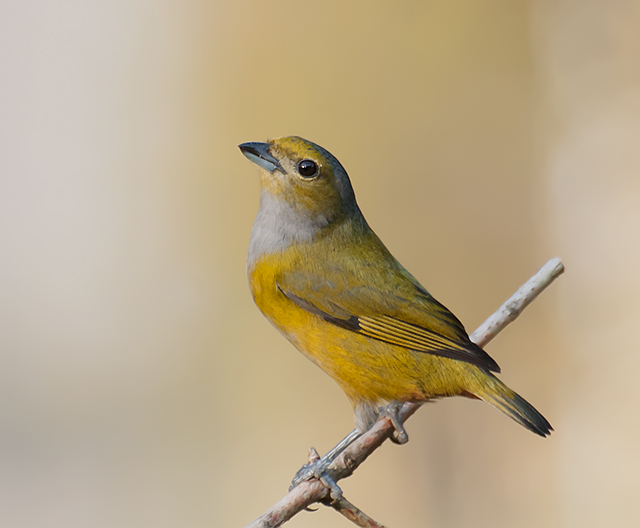
- Female

Conservation status
- Least Concern (IUCN 3.1)

Scientific classification
- Kingdom: Animalia
- Phylum: Chordata
- Class: Aves
- Order: Passeriformes
- Family: Fringillidae
- Subfamily: Euphoniinae
- Genus: Euphonia
- Species: E. pectoralis

Binomial name
- Euphonia pectoralis (Latham, 1801)

= Chestnut-bellied euphonia =

Species of bird

The chestnut-bellied euphonia (Euphonia pectoralis) is a species of bird in the family Fringillidae, the finches and euphonias. It is found in Argentina, Brazil, and Paraguay.

== Taxonomy and systematics ==
The chestnut-bellied euphonia was formally described in 1801 with the binomial Pipra pectoralis, mistakenly identifying it as a manakin. The species was eventually reassigned to genus Euphonia. At the time, the genus Euphonia was a member of the family Thraupidae, the "true" tanagers. Multiple studies in the late twentieth and early twenty-first centuries resulted in Euphonia being reassigned to its present place in the family Fringillidae.

The "black-throated euphonia" ("Euphonia vittata") was originally described as a species but is now believed to be a hybrid between the chestnut-bellied euphonia and the orange-bellied euphonia (E. xanthogaster).

The chestnut-bellied euphonia is monotypic.

== Description ==
The chestnut-bellied euphonia is about 11 cm (4.3 in) long and weighs 15 to 16.5 g (0.53 to 0.58 oz). It is a smallish euphonia with a stout bill. The species is sexually dimorphic. Adult males have a glossy metallic blue head, breast, and upperparts. Their flight feathers and tail are dusky with a metallic blue tinge and metallic blue feather edges. A patch of elongated golden-yellow pectoral feathers protrudes in front of the wing. Their underparts below the breast are dark chestnut. Adult females have a yellowish forecrown and face, a gray crown and nape, and olive upperparts, wings, and tail. Their sides and flanks are yellow-olive, their vent and undertail coverts dark rufous, and the rest of their underparts gray. Both sexes have a dark brown iris, a blackish maxilla, a blue-gray mandible with a blackish tip, and dark gray legs and feet.

== Distribution and habitat ==
The chestnut-bellied euphonia has a small isolated population in eastern Brazil's Pernambuco and Alagoas states. Its contiguous range in Brazil extends south from central Mato Grosso and southern Bahia to central Rio Grande do Sul and continues west into eastern Paraguay and far northeastern Argentina's Misiones Province. It inhabits the canopy, edges, and clearings of humid forest. It is found in lowlands in Argentina but reaches 1,300 m (4,300 ft) in Brazil.

== Behavior ==
=== Movement ===
The chestnut-bellied euphonia is a year-round resident.

=== Feeding ===
The chestnut-bellied euphonia feeds primarily on small fruits, and also includes smaller amounts of arthropods in its diet. It mostly forages singly, in pairs, and in small groups, and regularly joins mixed-species feeding flocks. It forages primarily from the forest's mid-level to the canopy.

=== Breeding ===
The chestnut-bellied euphonia's breeding season has not been defined but apparently includes January in southeastern Brazil and August in Paraguay. Its nest is an enclosed dome with a side entrance made from moss and ferns. It typically is built in an epiphyte cluster in a tree but some have been found in crevices in earthen banks. One clutch of three eggs has been found. The normal clutch size, incubation period, time to fledging, and details of parental care are not known.

=== Vocalization ===
The chestnut-bellied euphonia's song is "a short, harsh series of warbled notes that may include imitations of other birds". Its call is a "low, rattling, scratchy wru-wru-wru-wru-wru".

== Status ==
The IUCN has assessed the chestnut-bellied euphonia as being of Least Concern. Its population size is not known and is believed to be decreasing. No immediate threats have been identified. It is considered "common to frequent" in Brazil. It occurs in several protected areas but "little intact habitat remains outside protected areas".
