= Capture of Waterford =

1690 battle

- Part of Williamite War
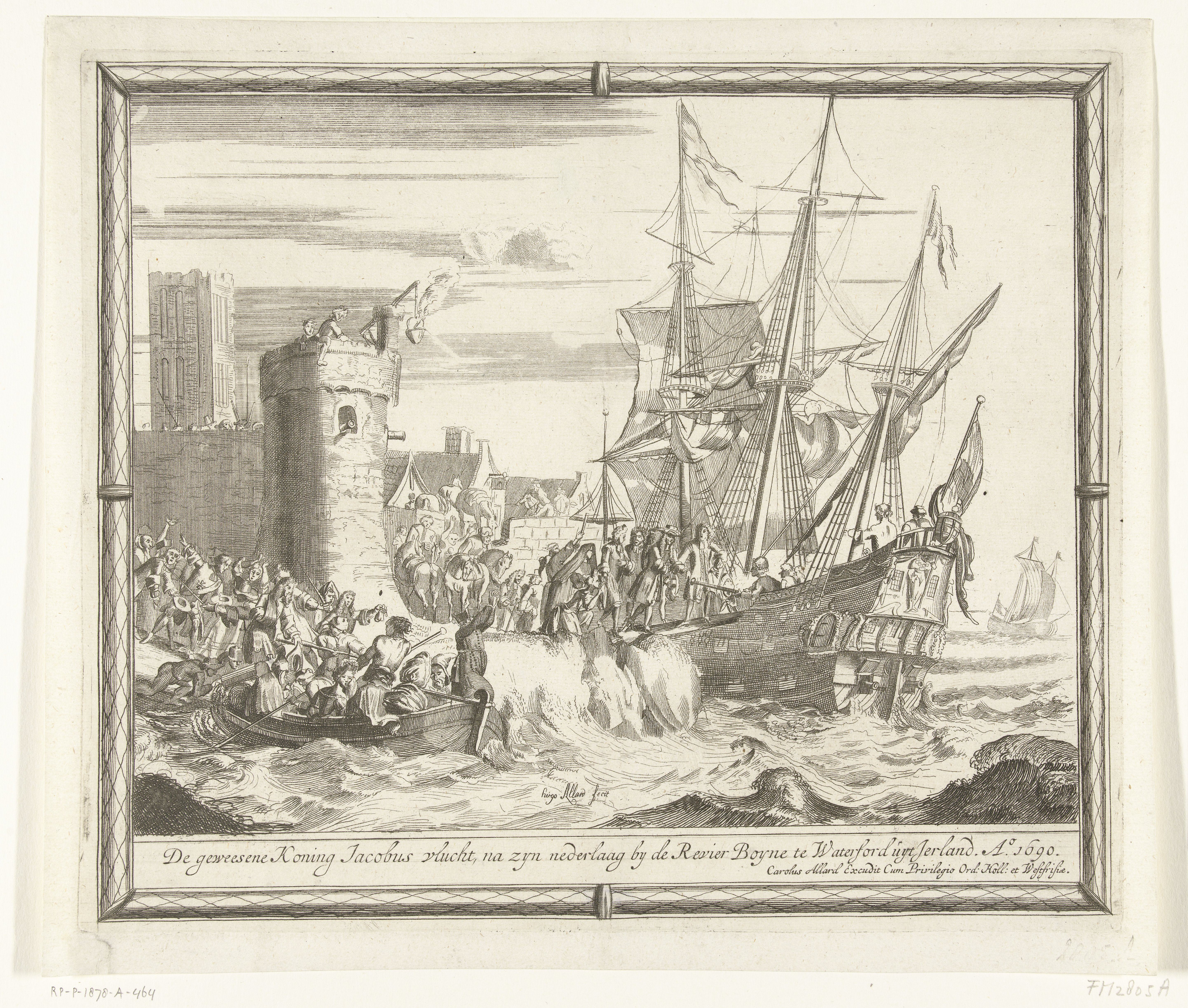
Date	July 1690
Location	Waterford, County Waterford, Ireland
Result	Williamite victory

Belligerents
Williamites	Jacobites

Commanders and leaders
Percy Kirke; Cloudesley Shovell	John Barrett; Michael Burke

The Capture of Waterford took place in July 1690 during the Williamite War in Ireland when a force under the command of Percy Kirke captured the town of Waterford from its Jacobite Irish Army garrison. Full control of the town was not secured until Duncannon Fort across Waterford Harbour was also taken from its garrison under Michael Burke shortly afterwards. In both cases the garrisons were allowed to march out under escort to Jacobite-held Mallow in County Cork, but were denied the "honours of war" which they demanded.

Following William of Orange's victory at the Battle of Boyne, the Jacobite Army had evacuated Dublin and retreated west towards Limerick. A cluster of garrisons remained which were now targeted by William's forces. Waterford was a major commercial port, estimated as the second biggest settlement in Ireland. It was one of the last major Jacobite strongholds in Leinster after Wexford had been abandoned without a fight. Waterford had a significant Protestant population of around three hundred families, and this possibly influenced William's plans for the town.

William's main field army was marching towards Limerick from Dublin, when on 21 July William sent a demand for Waterford's Governor John Barret to surrender. When the answer was not satisfactory the King detached four regiments of infantry and artillery under Percy Kirke to march on the town. Although preparations had been made to resist a siege, including the destruction of outlying suburbs which might offer cover to the attackers, the appearance of Kirke's forces shook Barret's confidence and he immediately opened negotiations to turn over the town in exchange for being able to take his 1,400 men westwards to rejoin the Jacobite army. Kirke took formal possession of the town on 25 July.

Having taken Waterford, Kirke now switched his attention to Duncannon Fort, a strong position across the bay in County Wexford. Burke, the commander of Duncannon, requested that he be allowed several days in which to send a messenger to Limerick to receive instructions from his superiors. Kirke rejected such an attempt at a delay and began to prepare to his siege forces. Burke responded with defiance. However, when a Royal Navy squadron under Cloudesley Shovell sailed into Waterford Bay, Burke changed his mind and surrendered on condition that his men could march out for Jacobite territory, rather than being held as prisoners. Some of the Catholic population of the area took advantage of William's Declaration of Finglas which had offered a pardon to Jacobite supporters while others left with the departing troops.

Following William's unsuccessful Siege of Limerick, he sailed for England from Waterford Harbour. While some Jacobites advocated an attempt to retake Waterford following William's withdrawal from Limerick this was not practical, and it remained in Williamite hands until the end of the war at the Treaty of Limerick.

== Bibliography ==
- Barratt, John. Battles for the Three Kingdoms: The Campaigns for England, Scotland and Ireland, 1689-92. Sutton, 2007.
- Childs, John. The Williamite Wars in Ireland. Bloomsbury Publishing, 2007.
- McNally, Michael. Battle of the Boyne 1690: The Irish Campaign for the English Crown. Osprey Publishing, 2005.
