= Tangier Regiment =

Tangier Regiment may refer to:

- Queen's Royal Regiment (West Surrey), known as the Tangier Regiment between 1661 and 1684
- 2nd Tangier Regiment (1680–1684)
