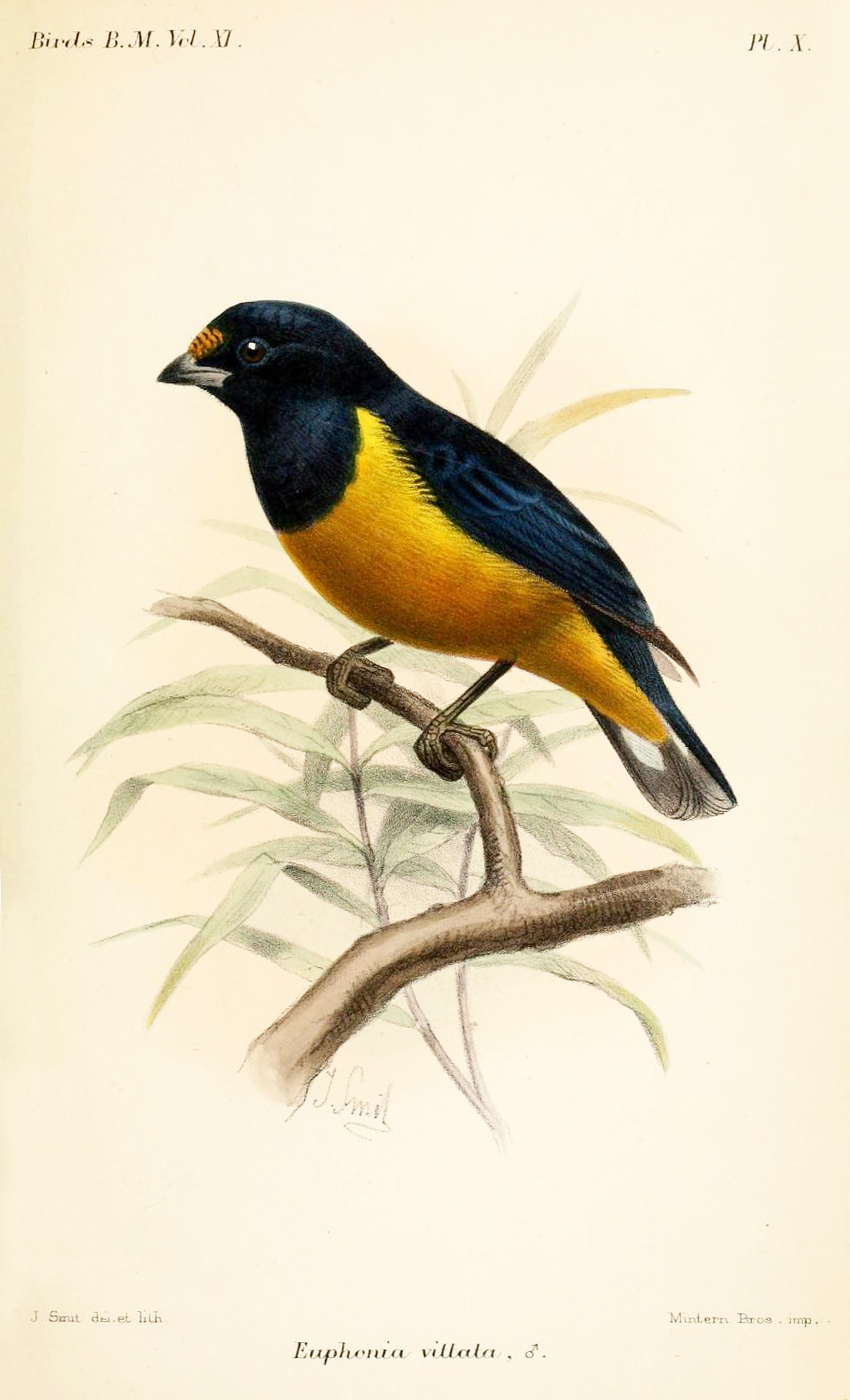
- Illustration by Joseph Smit, 1886

Scientific classification
- Kingdom: Animalia
- Phylum: Chordata
- Class: Aves
- Order: Passeriformes
- Family: Fringillidae
- Subfamily: Euphoniinae
- Genus: Euphonia
- Species: E. pectoralis × E. xanthogaster

Synonyms
- Euphonia catastica Hellmayr, 1936; Euphonia vittata Sclater, 1861

= Black-throated euphonia =

Species of bird

The black-throated euphonia is a bird in the Fringillidae, or finch family. It is known only by a single specimen in the British Natural History Museum with the type locality given as Rio de Janeiro, and was originally described as Euphonia vittata by Philip Sclater in 1861. It is now thought to be an intrageneric hybrid between the chestnut-bellied euphonia (Euphonia pectoralis) and the orange-bellied euphonia (Euphonia xanthogaster).
