= HMS Breda (1679) =

Ship of the line of the Royal Navy

History

England
- Name: HMS Bredah
- Ordered: 9 July 1678
- Builder: Isaac Betts, Harwich Dockyard
- Launched: 26 September 1679
- Fate: Gunpowder Explosion, 12 October 1690; Wreck lies at 51 49 32N 08 16 48W

General characteristics
- Class & type: 70-gun third rate ship of the line
- Tons burthen: 1021 91/94 (bm)
- Length: 151 ft 3 in (46.1 m) (gundeck)
- Beam: 39 ft 11 in (12.2 m)
- Draught: 18 ft (5.5 m)
- Depth of hold: 16 ft 9 in (5.1 m)
- Propulsion: Sails
- Sail plan: Full-rigged ship
- Armament: 70 guns of various weights of shot

HMS Bredah or Breda was a 70-gun third rate ship of the line of the English Royal Navy, designed and built under the supervision of Master Shipwright Isaac Betts at Harwich Dockyard, Bredah was launched on 26 September 1679, part of the second batch of eight third rates of the 1677 programme.

Having fought in the Battle of Beachy Head in 1690, Bredah was destroyed by an accidental fire later that year after participating in the Siege of Cork.

== Design and construction ==
Bredah was one of the new third rate ships of the line ordered on 9 July 1678 under the 1677 naval programme, known as the "Thirty Ships Programme", which was requested by Samuel Pepys in response to the Dutch and French navies surpassing England in the total number of ships of the line despite the English victory in the Third Anglo-Dutch War.

She had a length of 151 ft 3 in (46.1 m) at her gundeck and 120 ft 7 in (36.8 m) on her keel, a beam of 39 ft 11 in (12.17 m), and a hold depth of 16 ft 9 in (5.1 m). She measured 1,021 91/94 tons burthen and had a draught of 18 ft (5.5 m). She carried 70 guns with 13 gunports on each side on each of the lower and upper gundecks, five gunports on each side of the quarterdeck, two gunports on each side of the forecastle, and two gunports on each side of the poop; she had a crew of 460 men, reduced from a planned 470. According to the 1685 gun establishment, on her lower gun deck, Bredah carried 22 demi-cannon and four culverin guns. Her upper deck originally had twenty-six twelve-pounder guns. There were 14 sakers on the forecastle and the quarterdeck, as well as four 3-pounders on the roundhouse.

== Service ==
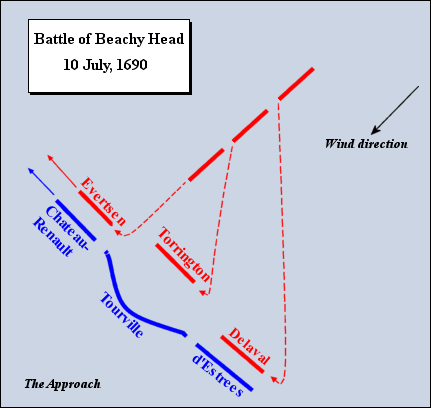
Beachy Head, 10 July 1690: Bredah and the Blue Squadron (rear) were opposed to d'Estrees' French rear

Bredah was commissioned on 26 July 1679 under the command of Captain John Moore, who died on 17 November of that year, so that she could be moved to Chatham Dockyard. She was recommissioned by 30 May 1689, when she was commanded by Captain Christopher Mason. In 1690 she was commanded by Captain Matthew Tennant and fought at the Battle of Beachy Head on 30 June of that year during the Nine Years' War as part of the English rear (the Bluequadron). Bredah went on to participate in the Siege of Cork later that year.

Following the surrender of the city on 29 September, she was anchored at Spike Island, Cork on 12 October 1690 with a full complement of 400 aboard, including troops and 160 Jacobite prisoners, captured after the Siege of Cork, when she was seen to be on fire, and a gunpowder explosion occurred. Jacobite prisoner Colonel John Barrett, who escaped, was considered to have deliberately set fire to the ship. There were nine other survivors; Tennant was among those killed, being picked up alive but died of his wounds within an hour.
