= Witmer Stone =

American ornithologist, botanist, and mammalogist (1866–1939)

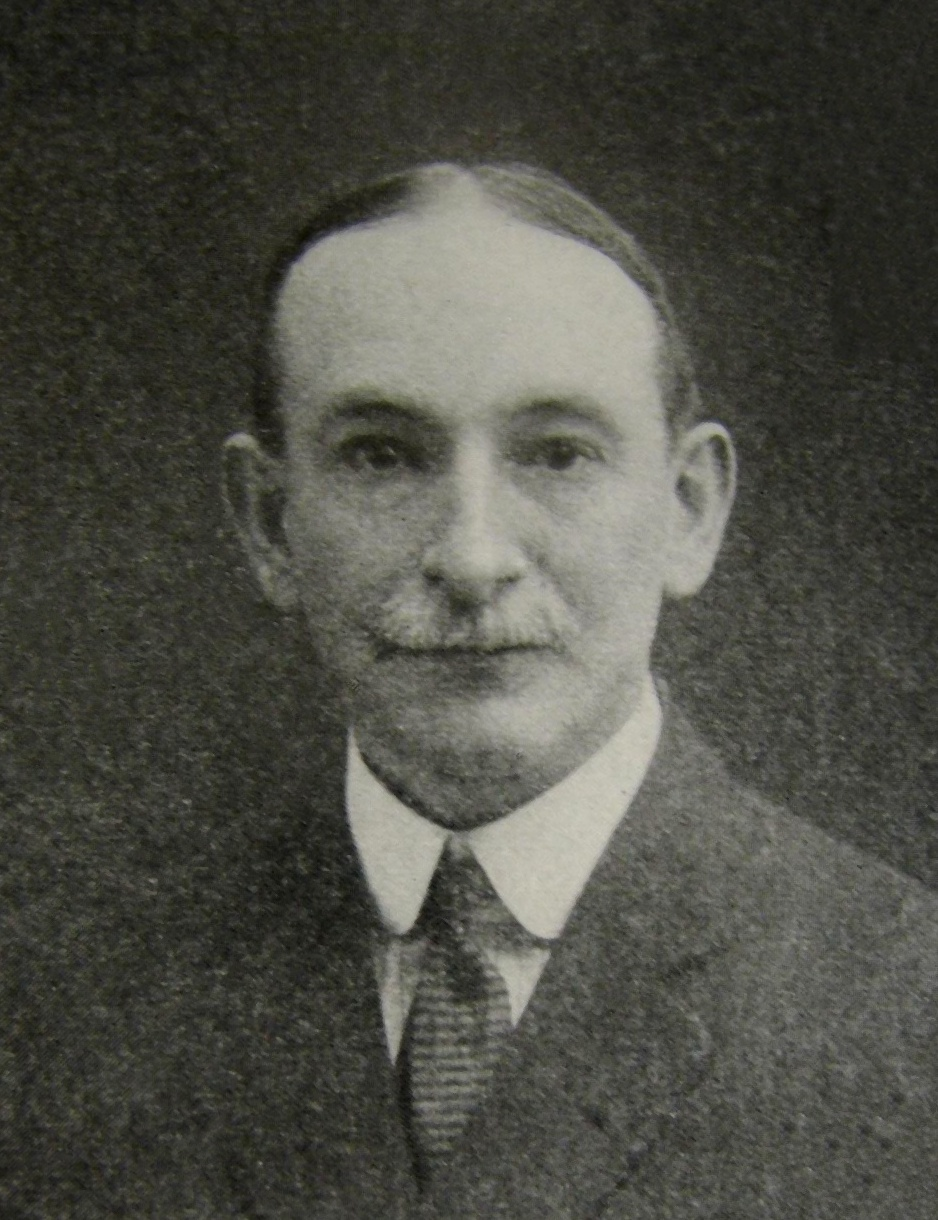
- Born: September 22, 1866; Philadelphia, Pennsylvania, U.S.
- Died: May 23, 1939 (aged 72); Philadelphia, Pennsylvania, U.S.
- Resting place: Laurel Hill Cemetery, Philadelphia, Pennsylvania, U.S.
- Spouse: Lillie Mae Lafferty (1904–1939)
- Scientific career
- Fields: Ornithologist, botanist, mammalogist
- Author abbrev. (botany): W.Stone

Witmer Stone (September 22, 1866 – May 24, 1939) was an American ornithologist, botanist, and mammalogist. He worked for over 51 years in the Ornithology Department at the Academy of Natural Sciences of Philadelphia, and served in multiple roles including as Director from 1925 to 1928. Stone was a founding member of the Delaware Valley Ornithological Club in 1890 and established their periodical Cassinia. He served as editor of the American Ornithologists' Union's periodical The Auk from 1912 to 1936 and as president of the organization from 1920 to 1923. He was a member of multiple scientific societies and president of the American Society of Mammalogists and the Pennsylvania Audubon Society. He published several books and hundreds of articles on birds, flora, and mammals with a focus on Eastern Pennsylvania and South Jersey.

The Witmer Stone Wildlife Sanctuary in Cape May Point, New Jersey, was established in 1935 by the National Audubon Society and named in his honor. He was posthumously awarded the Brewster Medal by the American Ornithologists' Union in 1939.

== Early life and education ==
Stone was born in Philadelphia, Pennsylvania, on September 22, 1866, to Anne Eveline (née Witmer) and Frederick Dawson Stone. He was raised in the Germantown neighborhood of Philadelphia which bordered wooded areas and the Wingohocking Creek. Stone, along with his brother Frederick and neighborhood friends, loved to explore the woods and formed the "Wilson Natural Science Association", named in honor of the pioneering American ornithologist Alexander Wilson.

Stone graduated from Germantown Academy in 1883, and received an A.B. degree from the University of Pennsylvania. After graduation, he worked for a brief time as an assistant in the library of the Historical Society of Pennsylvania. In March 1888, he was appointed a Jessup Fund Student at the Academy of Natural Sciences of Philadelphia, and helped organize their extensive collection of birds. The academy established an ornithology department in 1891, the same year that Stone completed an A.M. degree at the University of Pennsylvania. Stone married Lillie May Lafferty on August 1, 1904; they had no children. He received an honorary ScD. from the University of Pennsylvania in 1913, and was presented with the Alumni Award of Merit in 1937.

== Career ==
Stone worked at the Academy of Natural Sciences of Philadelphia for over 51 years. He inherited an ornithological specimens collection that had not been cared for properly since the death of John Cassin in 1869. Stone led efforts to salvage the ornithological collections and others. Some specimens were historically valuable, including types described by pioneering ornithologists and mammalogists. The size of the academy's bird collection increased fivefold during Stone's tenure, from 26,000 specimens to 143,000.

Stone participated in hundreds of academy sponsored field expeditions to the Pine Barrens and coastal regions of New Jersey. He also participated in field expeditions to various locations including Arizona, Bermuda, Kentucky, Maryland, Mexico, Minnesota, and South Carolina.

From 1893 to 1908, he worked as Assistant Curator at the academy; Curator 1908–1918 and Executive Curator 1918–1925; Director 1925–1928; Curator of Vertebrates, 1918–1936; and lastly, three titles (with year of appointment) that Stone held at the time of his death: Vice President (1927), emeritus Director (1928), and Honorary Curator of Birds (1938). In regard to Stone's tenure at the academy, the zoologist John Percy Moore stated that, "His life became so merged with that of the Academy that for many years it was difficult to think of them apart."

Stone was an original member of the Philadelphia Botanical Club. His focus was ornithology, but Stone also had a good knowledge of crustaceans, insects, mollusks, reptiles and the local flora. The Dutch botanist Frans Stafleu stated that "Stone's concentration on ornithology was a definite loss for botany." Stone produced 20 botanical publications during his lifetime.

After a joint meeting of the Philadelphia and Torrey Botanical Clubs in Toms River, New Jersey, in early July 1900, Stone resolved to write a book on the flora of the New Jersey Pine Barrens. Over the next decade Stone made hundreds of collecting trips to southern New Jersey. His research culminated in his publication of The Plants of Southern New Jersey in 1911. It has been described as "the only comprehensive floristic treatment for southern New Jersey and it continues to be used today [2002]."

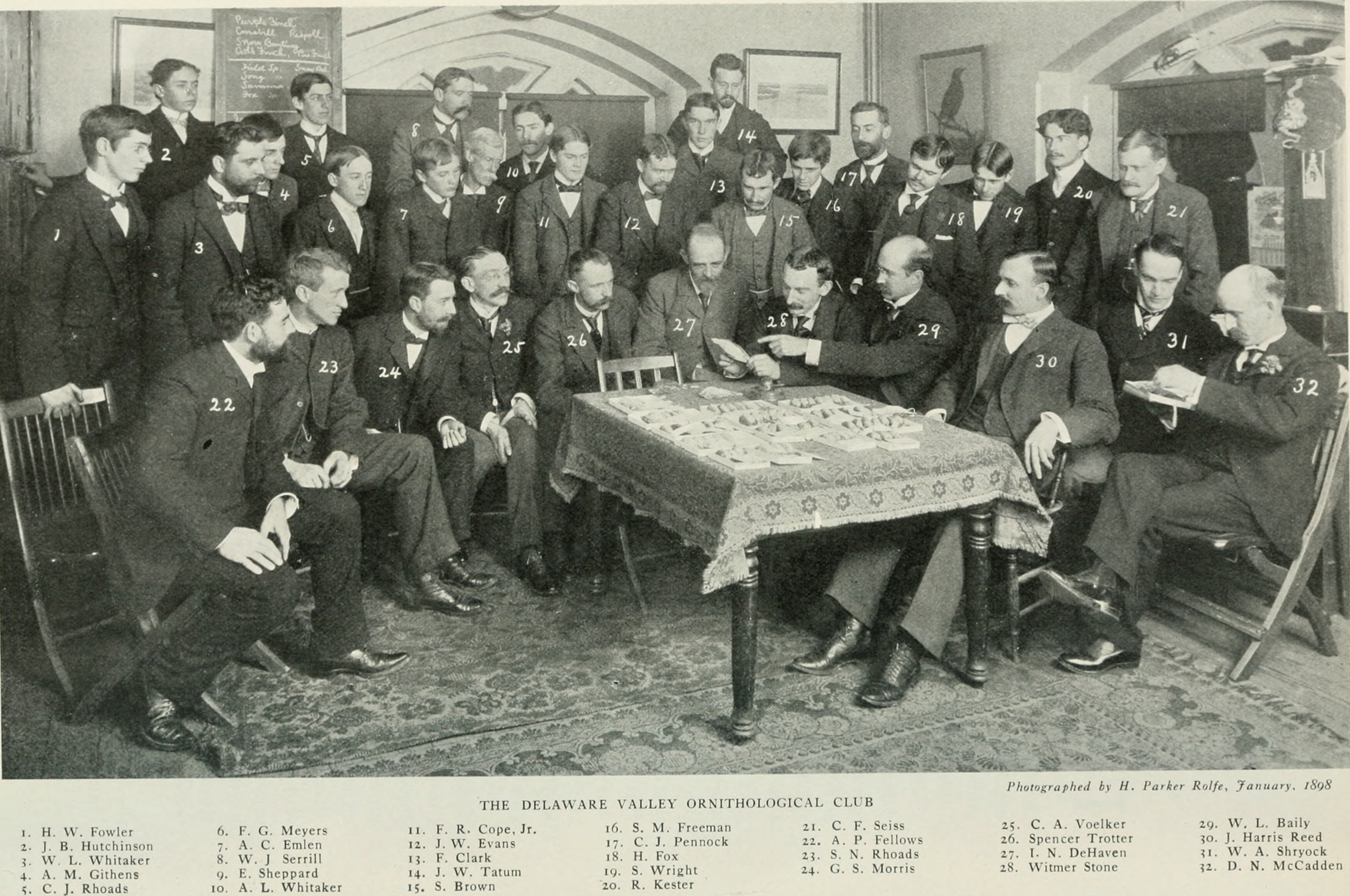
Members of the Delaware Valley Ornithological Club in January, 1898 - Stone is #28

Stone's first ornithology manuscript was "The Turkey Buzzard Breeding in Pennsylvania" published in American Naturalist in 1885. His first note in The Auk was "A migration of hawks at Germantown, Pennsylvania" in 1887. Stone was a founding member of the Delaware Valley Ornithological Club (DVOC) in 1890. His role at the Academy of Natural Sciences of Philadelphia allowed for the DVOC to meet at the academy. He founded the DVOC publication Cassinia and published multiple scientific papers, club activities and memorials. He authored the DVOC's The Birds of Eastern Pennsylvania and New Jersey, published in 1894 and Bird Studies at Old Cape in 1937. He wrote The Birds of New Jersey, Their Nests and Eggs, published in 1909 and hundreds of other ornithological papers.

Stone was elected an Associate of the American Ornithologists' Union (AOU) in 1885; a Fellow in 1892; and a member of the council in 1898. He served as chairman of the AOU Committee on Bird Protection 1896–1901; as a member (from 1901) and later as Chairman (1915–1931) of the AOU Committee on Classification and Nomenclature of North American Birds; and as editor of The Auk 1912–1936 (after editing the DVOC's Cassinia for ten years). Stone was vice-president of the AOU 1914–1920, and President 1920–1923. He chaired the committee which produced the 4th edition of the AOU checklist, published in 1931.

Stone was an honorary member of many ornithological and scientific societies including the Nuttall Ornithological Club, the Cooper Ornithological Club, and the Zoological Society of Philadelphia (Stone was also Director of the latter). He was awarded the Otto Hermann Medal of the Hungarian Ornithological Society in 1931 and was a member of the International Commission on Zoological Nomenclature, the Advisory Committee of the National Audubon Society, and the American Philosophical Society. He was president of the Pennsylvania Audubon Society and of the American Society of Mammalogists.

Stone's most enduring legacy is his Bird Studies at Old Cape May. 1,400 two-volume sets were originally published by the Delaware Valley Ornithological Club in 1937. This was an ornithological history of the New Jersey coast, with an emphasis on Cape May County, particularly the coastal areas. The bulk of the work consists of species accounts of all the birds that had been found in Cape May County at the time of the writing, with their historical occurrence in the state and notes on seasonality, habits, and behavior gleaned from Stone's notes and the records of fellow DVOC members. Stone dedicated Bird Studies at Old Cape May to his wife. Stone made frequent trips to Cape May, New Jersey, and it became his annual summer residence.

He died on May 23, 1939, and was interred at Laurel Hill Cemetery in Philadelphia.

== Legacy ==
In 1935, the National Audubon Society leased 25 acres of land in Cape May Point, New Jersey, for the creation of a wild life sanctuary and named it the Witmer Stone Wild Life Sanctuary in his honor. The location of the sanctuary is ideal for birding as it attracts migratory birds of the eastern seaboard looking for cover and food as they await favorable winds to cross the Delaware Bay. The sanctuary expanded to 1,000 acres, however in 1941, a magnesite factory for the production of fire brick needed to produce steel for the war effort was located in the middle of the sanctuary. The emissions from the factory damaged the flora and fauna of the sanctuary and the lease and sanctuary were abandoned in 1959. The former sanctuary is now part of Cape May Point State Park.

Stone was posthumously awarded the Brewster Medal by the American Ornithologists' Union in 1939.

In 1943, The Delaware Valley Ornithological Club established the Witmer Stone Award to recognize ornithological publications not conducted during professional duties.

== Publications ==
- The Birds of Eastern Pennsylvania and New Jersey, Philadelphia: Delaware Valley Ornithological Club, 1894
- American Animals - A Popular Guide to the Mammals of North America North of Mexico, With Intimate Biographies of the Most Familiar Species, New York: Doubleday, Page and Company, 1904
- The Plants of Southern New Jersey; With Especial Reference to the Flora of the Pine Barrens and the Geographic Distribution of the Species, Creative Media Partners LLC, 1911
- The Phylogenetic Value of Color Characters in Birds, Philadelphia, 1912
- The Hawaiian Rat, Honolulu, Hawaii: Bishop Museum Press, 1917
- Bird Studies at Old Cape May, Dover Publications, 1937
