= John Barrett (Irish soldier) =

John Barrett (died 1693) was a colonel and head of the barony of the Cork Barrett family.

Colonel Barrett is noted for raising a regiment of infantry for King James' Irish Army during the Williamite War. In 1690 following the Battle of the Boyne, he was forced to surrender Waterford. In 1691 the Williamite confiscation deprived Barrett, the head of the family at that time, of 12,000 acres (49 km^{2}). He was killed in the French service at the Battle of Landen, alongside fellow Jacobite Patrick Sarsfield, in 1693.

== History ==
A Catholic, Barrett was elected as a Member of Parliament for Mallow in the Patriot Parliament of 1689. He raised a regiment for King James II during the onset of the Williamite War in Ireland. In 1690 he was the Military Governor of Waterford where he controlled his Cork regiment and another regiment of foot soldiers from the town. Following the Jacobite defeat at the Battle of the Boyne the Williamite army marched upon Waterford where he was forced to surrender the town, under stipulation of returning to Cork with his men and arms. There his regiment became a portion of the Jacobite garrison of Cork. Following the Siege of Cork he was taken prisoner by Marlborough and placed upon the Breda man-of-war where he was to be delivered to England. During his transfer there was an accidental lighting of a powder magazine sinking the vessel. He and a number of other prisoners escaped to shore. After the Treaty of Limerick he traveled to France where he served as Colonel in the Irish "Gardes du Roi Jaques" and fought at the Battle of Landen. There he led his regiment as the first corps to force an opening in the Williamite entrenchment but was killed in battle.

Parliament of Ireland
Preceded by Heywood St Leger; Thomas Pooley	Member of Parliament for Mallow; 1689; With: David Nagle	Succeeded by Laurence Clayton; John Jephson
