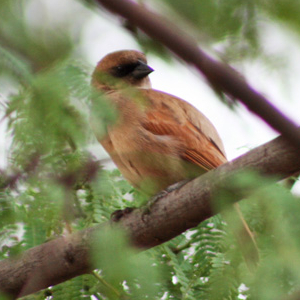
- Agelaioides fringillarius

Conservation status
- Least Concern (IUCN 3.1)

Scientific classification
- Kingdom: Animalia
- Phylum: Chordata
- Class: Aves
- Order: Passeriformes
- Family: Icteridae
- Genus: Agelaioides
- Species: A. fringillarius

Binomial name
- Agelaioides fringillarius (von Spix, 1824)

= Pale baywing =

Species of bird

The pale baywing (Agelaioides fringillarius) is a species of bird in the family Icteridae, the oropendolas, New World orioles, and New World blackbirds. It is endemic to Brazil.

== Taxonomy and systematics ==
The pale baywing was formally described in 1824 with the binomial Icterus fringillarius. It was later treated as a subspecies of what was then called the "bay-winged cowbird" (then Molothrus badius) and spent most of the twentieth century in that position. After the bay-winged cowbird was reassigned to its present genus Agelaioides many authors called it simply "baywing" because it had significant behavioral differences from the Molothrus cowbirds. At this time it included three subspecies. In the mid-2010s A. b. fringillarius was recognized as the full species named the pale baywing. The reduced A. badius, which includes a second subspecies A. b. bolivianus, was renamed the greyish baywing.

The pale baywing is monotypic.

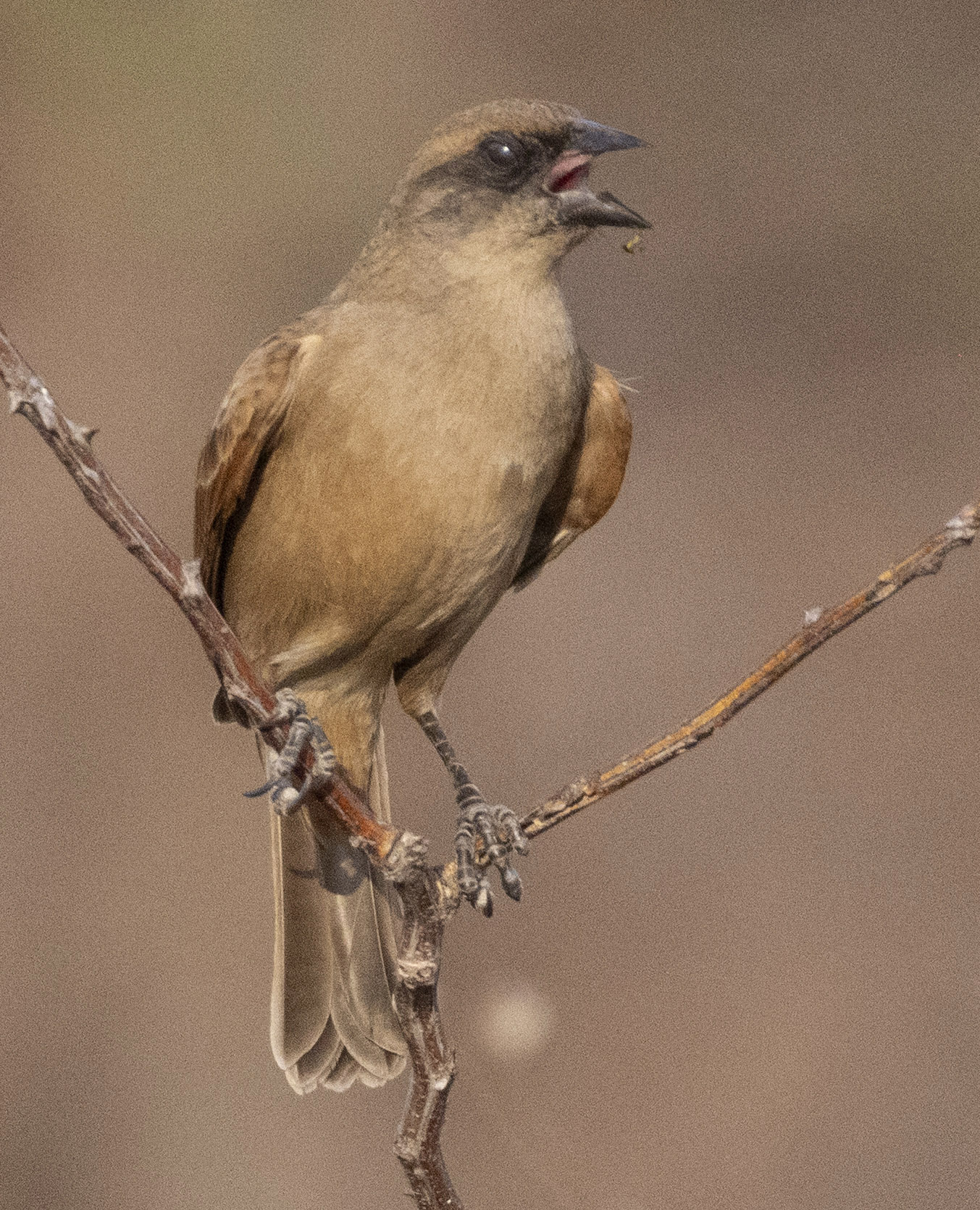
Pale baywing

== Description ==
The pale baywing is 19 cm (7 in) long. Males weigh an average of about 40 g (1.4 oz). The sexes have the same plumage. Adults have a mostly pale sandy brown head and body with a paler rump. Their upperwing is blackish brown with wide rufous-cinnamon edges whose color dominates the closed wing. Their tail is dusky. They have a dark brown iris, a black bill, and black legs and feet.

== Distribution and habitat ==
The pale baywing is found in northeastern Brazil from Piauí east to the Atlantic, south along the Atlantic to Alagoas, and south inland through central Bahia into north-central Minas Gerais. It inhabits caatinga forest and woodlands both primary and secondary, scrublands, pastures, and fields. It is common around rural human habitations and sometimes nests in small towns. In elevation it mostly ranges from sea level to 800 m (2,600 ft).

== Behavior ==
=== Movement ===
The pale baywing is a year-round resident.

=== Feeding ===
The pale baywing feeds mostly on insects, seeds of wild plants, and seeds of crops like corn and sorghum. It mostly feeds on the ground, both in natural areas and in corrals and barnyards. It forages in pairs and in flocks that typically number up to 20 individuals. However, one study noted about 70 birds feeding in a corral.

=== Breeding ===
The pale baywing breeds between January and April in the northern part of its range and between November and January in Minas Gerais. It is a cooperative breeder; up to six helpers have been noted vigorously defending nests and provisioning nestlings. It builds a cup nest from plant fibers, hair, and feathers, typically in an abandoned enclosed stick nest of another bird such as the rufous-fronted thornbird (Phacellodomus rufifrons). Less often it builds in a natural cavity or in the crown of a palm. The clutch size, incubation period, time to fledging, and other details of care are not known. Nests are parasitized by the shiny cowbird (Molothrus bonariensis) and possibly by the screaming cowbird (M. rufoaxillaris).

=== Vocalization ===
The pale baywing's song is "a slow, hesitant sequence of descending whistles mixed with calls". Possibly both sexes sing, and the species does sing in groups. It also makes raspy or chattery calls and a "kwoink" contact call.

== Status ==
The IUCN has assessed the pale baywing as being of Least Concern. It has a large range; its population size is not known but is believed to be stable. No immediate threats have been identified. It is considered "frequent to uncommon". It "[a]dapts to human-modified environments".
