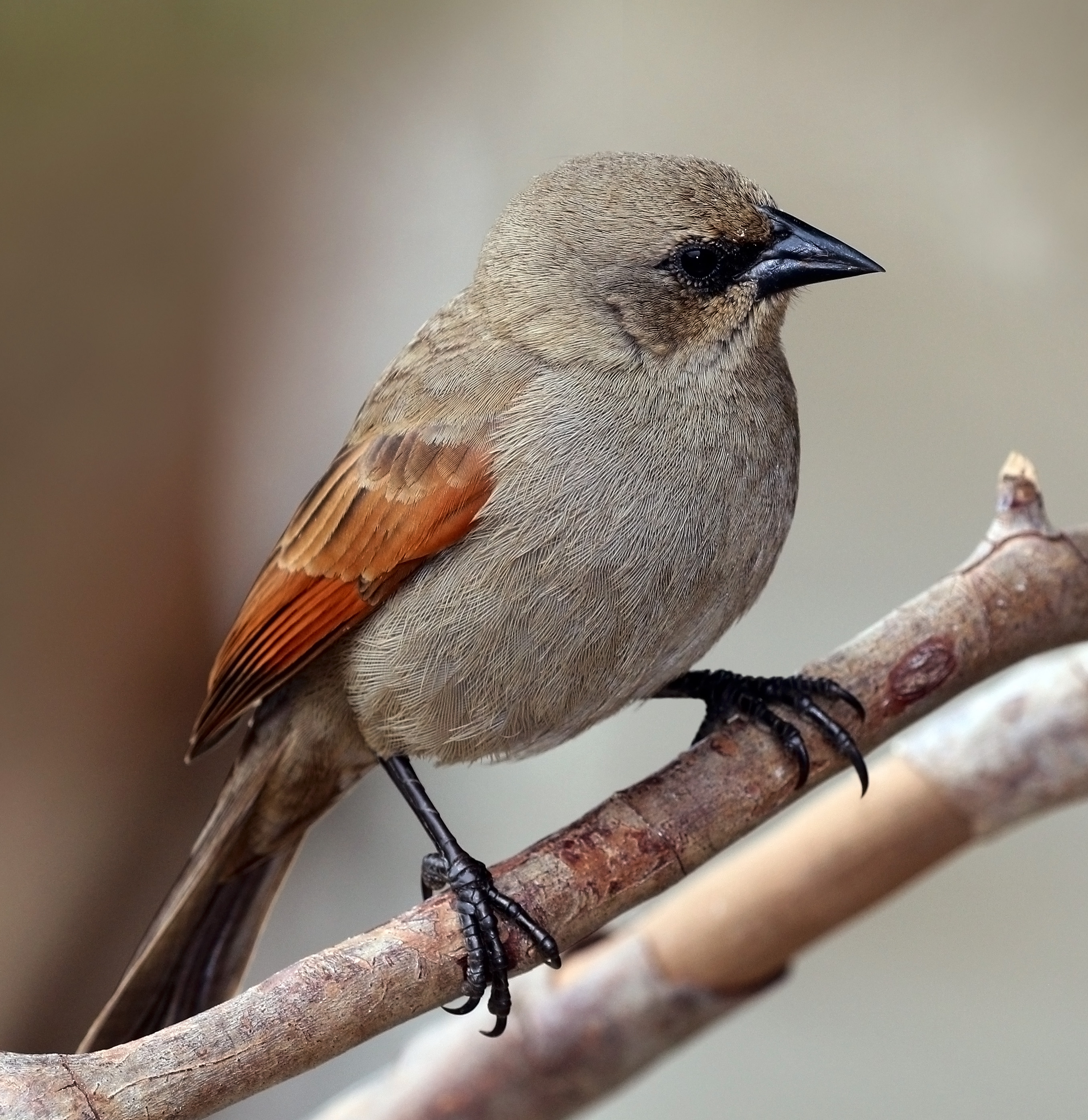
- A. b. badius, Pantanal, Brazil

Conservation status
- Least Concern (IUCN 3.1)

Scientific classification
- Kingdom: Animalia
- Phylum: Chordata
- Class: Aves
- Order: Passeriformes
- Family: Icteridae
- Genus: Agelaioides
- Species: A. badius

Binomial name
- Agelaioides badius (Vieillot, 1819)

Synonyms
- See text

= Grayish baywing =

Species of bird

The greyish baywing (Agelaioides badius) is a species of bird in the family Icteridae, the oropendolas, New World orioles, and New World blackbirds. It is found in Argentina, Bolivia, Brazil, Paraguay, and Uruguay, and there are unconfirmed reports from Chile.

== Taxonomy and systematics ==
The greyish baywing was formally described in 1819 with the binomial Agelaius badius. It was later placed in genus Molothrus and spent most of the twentieth century there with the English name "bay-winged cowbird". After it was reassigned to its present genus Agelaioides many authors called it simply "baywing" because it had significant behavioral differences from the Molothrus cowbirds. At this time it included three subspecies. In the mid-2010s one of them, A. b. fringillarius, was recognized as a full species and named the pale baywing. The reduced A. badius, which includes the second subspecies A. b. bolivianus, was renamed the greyish baywing.

== Description ==
The greyish baywing is 19 cm (7 in) long. Males weigh an average of about 46 g (1.6 oz) and females average about 42 g (1.5 oz). Both sexes of both subspecies have the same plumage though A. b. bolivianus is larger than the nominate A. b. badius. Adults have a mostly grayish buffy brown head, neck, and upperparts. They have blackish lores and ear coverts and an otherwise grayish buffy brown face. Their uppertail coverts are olive-brown and their tail very dark olive-brown. Their lesser wing coverts are sandy buffy brown, their middle wing coverts are light grayish rufous, and their greater wing coverts are dark blackish brown with wide rufous edges. Their primaries and secondaries are dark blackish brown with light rufous chestnut outer edges. Their underparts are sandy olive buffy brown and their underwing coverts pale gray. They have a dark eye, a black bill, and black legs and feet.

== Distribution and habitat ==
The nominate subspecies of the greyish baywing has a much larger range than A. b. bolivianus. It is found from eastern Bolivia's Beni Department and southwestern Brazil's Mato Grosso and southern Brazil's Paraná states south through eastern Bolivia, Paraguay, Uruguay, and northern and central Argentina to Chubut Province. Subspecies A. b. bolivianus has a much smaller range in central and southern Bolivia from La Paz Department to Chuquisaca Department. However, some authors state that A. b. bolivianus rather than the nominate occurs in far northwestern Argentina. The status of the nominate subspecies in Chile is in dispute. One source says it arrived as a vagrant and another that it was introduced to the country. However, the South American Classification Committee has no confirmed records of the species in Chile.

The greyish baywing inhabits a variety of open landscapes both natural and human-modified. These include open woodlands, savanna, scrub- and brushlands, pastures, agricultural lands, and suburban areas. In elevation the nominate subspecies is found from sea level to at most 1,000 m (3,300 ft) while A. b. bolivianus is known up to 2,900 m (9,500 ft) and could occur as high as 3,350 m (11,000 ft).

== Behavior ==
=== Movement ===
The greyish baywing is a year-round resident.

=== Feeding ===
The greyish baywing's diet has not been fully defined but it is known to include insects, seeds of wild plants, and seeds of crops like corn and rice. It forages in dense vegetation on the ground and also in shrubs and trees. In the early breeding season it typically forages singly or in pairs; later in that season and afterwards it is often in flocks of up to about 25 individuals.

=== Breeding ===
The greyish baywing's breeding season spans at least late October to March. It is a cooperative breeder. It typically builds its nest in cavities whose variety includes woodpecker holes, nest boxes, the abandoned domed mud nests of ovenbirds, and abandoned enclosed stick nests of other birds such as kiskadees and thornbirds. It less often builds them in vine clusters, palms, conifers, and bromeliads. The nest itself is made from grass and other plant fibers. Clutches average about four eggs that are usually grayish white with dark markings. Females incubate the clutch for 13 to 14 days. Fledging occurs 12 to 16 days after hatch. Both parents and helpers provision nestlings and guard the nest. The greyish baywing is the primary, and almost exclusive, host of the brood parasite screaming cowbird (Molothrus rufoaxillaris). Nests are also parasitized by the shiny cowbird (M. bonariensis).

=== Vocalization ===
The greyish baywing sings "a quiet, musical continuum of warbles and trills, often in chorus". In flight both sexes give a "clear prolonged whistle peeeooh". Its primary call has been written as a "harsh, hoarse, guttural chuck", " a squeaky chayt, chap", a "weak kik errt, kik, riiie, kik krrr, krrr and tji drrrrrrt", and "a sharp clear tuit".

== Status ==
The IUCN has assessed the greyish baywing as being of Least Concern. It has a very large range; its population size is not known but is believed to be stable. No immediate threats have been identified. It is considered "common to frequent" in Brazil and common in the rest of its range. It has "adapted for living in modified environments" and occurs in many protected areas.
