= Leola Hall =

American architect and builder

- Born: June 8, 1881; San Leandro, California
- Died: September 22, 1930 (aged 49)
- Resting place: Mountain View Cemetery, Oakland, CA
- Other name: Leola Hall Coggins
- Occupation: architect
- Years active: ca. 1906–ca. 1915
- Known for: American Craftsman buildings
- Spouse: Herbert L. Coggins

Leola Hall (1881–1930), also known as Leola Hall Coggins, was an American architect and builder who worked in the American Craftsman style. During the prime years of her career, she was the only female architect active in Berkeley, California, making her the East Bay counterpart of the much more famous Julia Morgan in San Francisco. The large number of houses she built in Berkeley, California, following the 1906 San Francisco earthquake defined what is now often considered Berkeley's signature version of the Craftsman style.

== Early life and education ==
Hall was born in San Leandro, California on June 18, 1881. Her father was a miner who worked a good deal in Arizona, where he was sometimes joined by his family. During these periods spent in Arizona, Hall learned to ride and round up steers. After Hall's father's death, her mother married a contractor. In early life, Hall had ambitions to become either a musician (it's said she could play several instruments by ear) or an artist. She studied painting with the landscapists William Keith and Raymond Dabb Yelland and later in life painted landscapes as well as portraits of such notables as Keith, the poet Edwin Markham, Stanford University president David Starr Jordan, and Montana senator Burton K. Wheeler.

During a convalescence, Hall began creating saleable items such as designs for pillows and decorative objects made with the then-popular wood-burning technique. Her pillows sold well, and she copyrighted her designs and began saving money towards becoming an architect. In her early 20s, she began to accompany a relative who was a contractor, John Marshall, to his construction sites. She soon began working as his assistant, and after gaining a broad grounding in the building business, bought her first piece of land.

== Architectural career ==
Hall became an architect in a period when women were still rare in the profession. During her peak years of activity as the only female architect in Berkeley, California, she was the East Bay counterpart of the more famous Julia Morgan in San Francisco, and her buildings have often been confused with Morgan's. Although not formally trained as an architect, she became a builder out of her desire to see affordable housing produced. Marshall helped with Hall's first building project, but she struck out on her own fairly quickly. She oversaw most of the building process herself, from designing each building to buying property, serving as construction overseer, handling the financing, and selling the finished house. She met her goal of low cost mainly by squeezing extra buildings onto her lots and by standardizing features. At the same time, she was able to maintain high quality: a good number of her houses are still standing today and are valued for both the elegance and livability of their design.

Hall's earliest buildings were two-story Neoclassical buildings, but by her late twenties she was working in the Craftsman style. Distinctive features of Hall houses include small kitchens and bedrooms, large public areas, more closets and storage spaces than usual, bay and oriel windows, stepped stair railings with squared balusters, pocket doors, rough clinker brick fireplaces (often with seating nooks), wooden wainscoting, built-in china cabinets, and a tendency to place the front door on the side of the house. Especially notable is her attention to design features that made life easier for women, such as pass-throughs between kitchens and dining rooms.

Hall got into speculative building in the East Bay on a large scale following the 1906 San Francisco earthquake, which created an exodus of people looking for new homes outside the city itself. Between 1906 and 1912 she concentrated on the Elmwood district of Berkeley, an area that was then just beginning to be developed. Hall built many of the homes along College Avenue and on nearby streets that are now often taken as Berkeley's signature style: one- and two-story brown-shingled buildings with wide eaves and exposed beams.

The total number of buildings by Hall is uncertain but probably falls between 40 and 100 — and, remarkably, most of them were completed before she had turned 35. As early as 1907, an interviewer for the San Francisco Call was marveling at Hall's accomplishment, saying, "I've known women to try all kinds of men's work, but a girl who selects prospective bargains in real estate, who plans and builds her own houses and who sells them as quickly as you do, is really unique."

Among Hall buildings still standing is one of her last and finest, the 1912 "Honeymoon House" on Piedmont Avenue. She built this house for herself and her new husband, Herbert L. "Curly" Coggins, an editor, author, and lecturer in ornithology.

== Later life ==
After their marriage, Hall and Coggins ran several businesses together, including a concrete contracting company that they took over from Hall's stepfather and some auto parts stores. Hall spent less time on architecture and more on painting, especially landscapes, and she signed her paintings under her married name, Leola Hall Coggins.

Politically active as a member of the College Equal Suffrage League, Hall was once arrested for speeding when driving fellow suffragist Margaret Haley to a rally. Hall and Haley suspected political motivations behind the arrest and rallied women to protest. Some two hundred women turned up at the court hearing in Oakland waving "Votes for Women" banners. Haley testified that the car had not been going more than 8 miles per hour, and the charges against Hall were eventually dropped. A socialist and supporter of Progressive politics, Hall also served as vice-president of the local Roosevelt Club during one of Theodore Roosevelt's presidential campaigns.

Hall died at home on Sept. 22, 1930, of heart troubles from which she had suffered for many years, not long before her 50th birthday. Her husband survived her by four decades, dying in late 1974.

== List of known Hall houses in Berkeley ==
=== 1906-7 ===
- 3004, 3006, 3008, 3012, 3026, 3030, 3032, 3036, 3040, 3042, 3046, 3048 College Ave.

=== 1908 ===
- 2618, 2620, 2624, 2628, 2634 College Ave.

=== 1909 ===
- 2730, 2732, 2747, 2804, 2806 Stuart St.
- 2800 Kelsey St.
- 2752, 2754, 2758, 2800 Piedmont Ave.
- 2709 Parker St.

=== 1912 ===
- 2806, 2808 Ashby Ave.
- 2929 Piedmont Ave. ("Honeymoon House")

=== 1915 ===
- 2848 Russell St.
- 2904, 2906 Pine Ave.
