= Geoffrey Hilder =

Archdeacon of Taunton

Geoffrey Frank Hilder (17 July 1906 – 6 February 1988) was Archdeacon of Taunton from 1951 until 1971.

== Early life ==
Hilder was the younger son of Albert Thomas Hilder, a dentist, and Lilian Ethel (nee Hallwright). He was educated at Uppingham School; Lincoln College, Oxford; the Inner Temple; and Ely Theological College.

== Career ==
He was called to the Bar in 1930. He was ordained Deacon in 1931; and Priest in 1932. He served his title at St John the Evangelist, East Dulwich (1931–34) and Goldthorpe (1934-37).

He was Rector of Ruardean from 1937 to 1941; Vicar of St Stephen, Cheltenham from 1941 to 1948; and Vicar of Hambridge from 1948 to 1959. He was Prolocutor of the Lower House of Convocation of Canterbury from 1955 to 1970; a Director of Ecclesiastical Insurance Office Ltd from 1957 to 1961 a Prebendary of Wells Cathedral from 1951 to 1973; and Provost of the Western Division of the Woodard Corporation from 1960 to 1970.

== Personal life ==
He married Enid Coggin in 1939, sister of the crime novelist Joan Coggin. In retirement Hilder and his wife lived in Bude. He died in Barnstaple in 1988, aged 81. There were no children of the marriage.
