= Joan Coggin =

British crime writer

- Born: 22 July 1898; Lemsford, Hertfordshire, England
- Died: 11 August 1980 (aged 82); Eastbourne, East Sussex, England
- Occupation: Novelist
- Writing career
- Pen name: Joanna Lloyd
- Genres: Murder mystery; detective story; crime fiction; thriller
- Movement: Golden Age of Detective Fiction

Joan Coggin (22 July 1898 – 11 August 1980) was a British crime writer during the golden age of detective fiction. She also wrote children's novels under the pseudonym Joanna Lloyd.

== Early life ==
Coggin was born in Lemsford, Hertfordshire in 1898, the daughter of the Revd Frederick Ernest Coggin (1859–1947) and his wife Clara (née Lloyd) (1866–1906); Clara Lloyd was the daughter of the publisher Edward Lloyd. At the time of her birth, her father was Vicar of Lemsford (1891–1905); his successor, the Revd A.E. Ward (1905–1920), was the father of the society osteopath, Stephen Ward.

Joan Coggin was one of four children. Her siblings were:

- Maurice Edward Henry, who married Eleanora Illeris, a member of the SOE during WWII. Their daughter Janet Coggin was a novelist, and the first wife of the KGB spy Dieter Gerhardt.
- (Frederick) Leslie, who was a schoolmaster: in 1937 he travelled to Moscow to learn Russian and thereby set up the Russian department at Marlborough College. He married Elaine Wood, the headmistress of the Geelong C of E Girls' Grammar School, The Hermitage in the 1960s.
- Enid, who married another clergyman, Geoffrey Hilder.

Immediately prior to her mother's early death, Coggin's father retired to Eastbourne; on her death he was left the large sum of £54,871 (worth £4m in 2017). Apart from her schooling, Coggin lived the rest of her life in Eastbourne.

Coggin attended Wycombe Abbey School from 1911 to 1916, and was then a ward nurse at the De Walden Court Military Hospital in Eastbourne during the remainder of the First World War.

== Literary career ==
Her crime novels featured Lady Lupin Lorimer Hastings, a clergyman's wife, as her detective. She also wrote children's novels under a pseudonym.

== List of works ==
Coggin's first novel was And Why Not Knowing (1929).

=== Crime novels ===
- Who Killed the Curate? (1944). Republished 2023.
- The Mystery at Orchard House (1944). Republished 2003.
- Penelope Passes or Why Did She Die? (1947). Republished 2003.
- Dancing with Death (1947). Republished 2022.

=== Children's novels ===
She also wrote children's novels as Joanna Lloyd.

- Betty of Turner House (1935).
- Girls’ Adventure Book (1935).

Most of her children's novels were in a series called Bramber Manor.

- Catherine Goes to School (1945).
- Jane Runs Away from School (1946).
- Catherine, Head of the House (1947).
- Audrey, A New Girl (1948).
- Three New Girls (1949).

== Personal life ==
Coggin was unmarried; she died in 1980. She died at Southfields Nursing Home in Eastbourne. Her funeral was a requiem mass at St Michael and All Angels in Eastbourne and she was buried at Ocklynge Cemetery.
