= Delaware Valley Ornithological Club =

US nonprofit organization

- Abbreviation: DVOC
- Formation: February 3, 1890; 136 years ago
- Founded at: Philadelphia, Pennsylvania
- Type: Nonprofit
- Tax ID no.: 23-7058391
- Headquarters: Philadelphia, Pennsylvania
- Region served: Delaware River Valley
- Website: dvoc.org

The Delaware Valley Ornithological Club (DVOC) is one of the oldest ornithology organizations in the United States. Founded in 1890, the club has held regular meetings at the Academy of Natural Sciences of Philadelphia for over 125 years, and has published the periodical Cassinia since 1901. Membership is open to any dues paying person with an interest in birds. The club organizes birdwatching field trips throughout the Delaware River valley region, including a dedicated year-round trip schedule within the city limits of Philadelphia (BirdPhilly).

== History ==
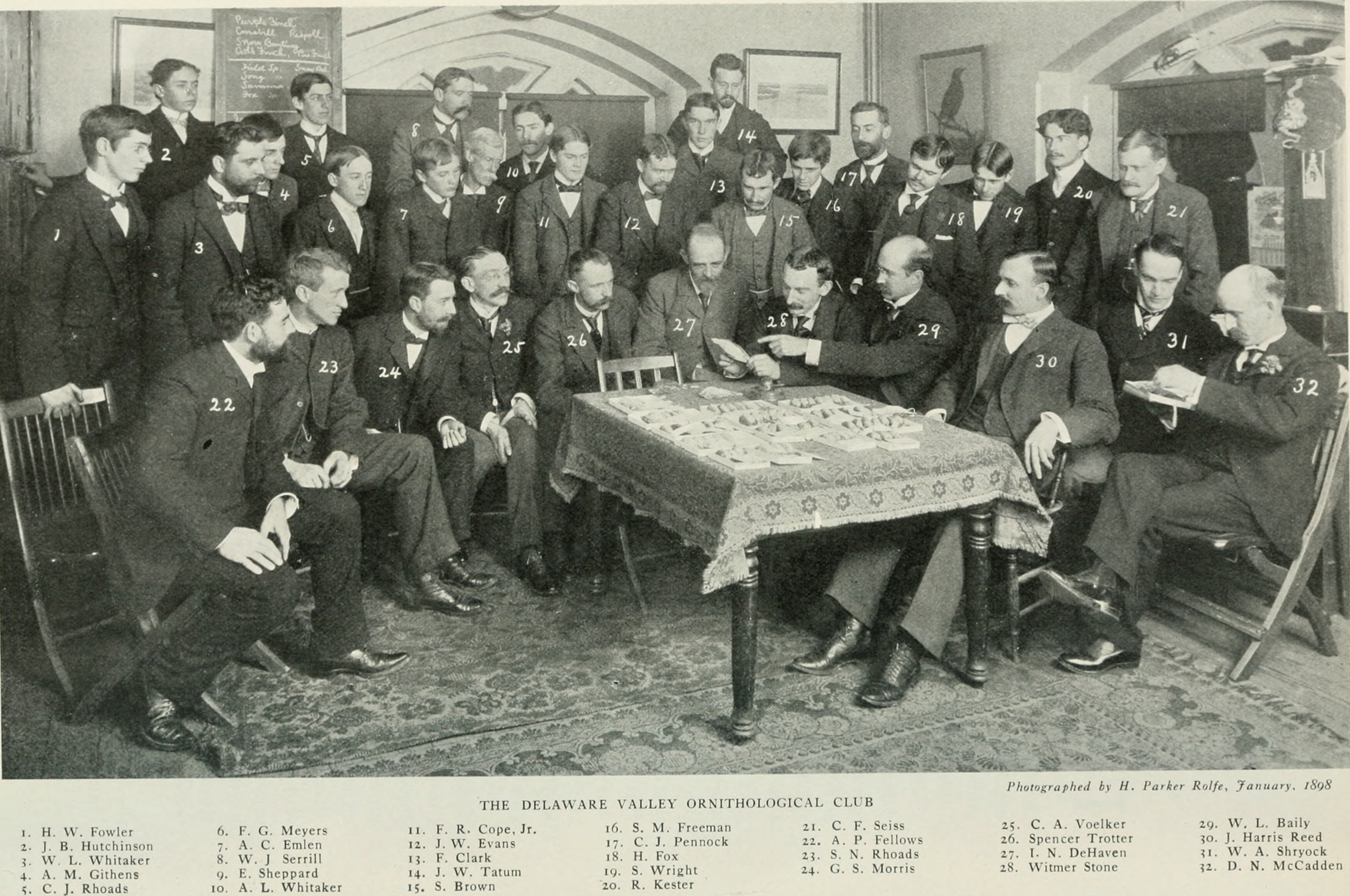
The DVOC in 1898

The DVOC was founded on February 3, 1890, in Philadelphia, Pennsylvania, by seven young men: (1) William Lloyd Baily, an architect who held the post of Inspector of Birds and Mammals at the Port of Philadelphia for 45 years; his uncle of the same name had authored the popular book Our Own Birds; a familiar natural history of the birds of the United States in 1867; (2) George Spencer Morris, an architect who was the great-nephew (on his mother's side) of Dr. John Spencer; Spencer had been a friend of Edward Harris, patron of John James Audubon; (3) J. Harris Reed, an architect who later became Philadelphia City Inspector; (4) Samuel Nicholson Rhoads, a farmer and bookseller who later suffered a mental breakdown and spent the remainder of his life in sanitariums; (5) Witmer Stone, who would become a famed naturalist and President of the American Ornithologists' Union and editor of its journal The Auk; (6) Spencer Trotter, a medical doctor and Professor of Biology at Swarthmore College; and (7) Charles Voelker, a German-born taxidermist.

Many past and present members of the DVOC have been active at the Academy of Natural Sciences of Drexel University. The founders and other early members of the DVOC contributed 2701 bird specimens, 65% of which were collected in the Delaware Valley, to the Ornithology Collection at the Academy.

=== Female membership ===
The original constitution stipulated that members "shall be persons who are interested in ornithology considered in its widest sense," and so did not technically prevent women from joining the DVOC. Notwithstanding, the culture of the club was not welcoming to them, and a separate organization (ironically, named after a man—the Spencer F. Baird Ornithological Club) was formed in 1900 by an enthusiastic group of female ornithologists in Philadelphia; but enthusiasm and membership eventually waned and that club was disbanded. The issue of female membership was formally discussed by DVOC members in November 1951, and thereafter became a hot-button issue in the club until membership was eventually granted to women in 1982:

"A committee had been appointed for the purpose of proposing a change in the Constitution. After spirited discussion a vote was taken. The stand-patters not only won the day with enough votes to keep the status quo, but succeeded in making it official and not just implied by having the word "male" inserted in Article II so that it read that the members "shall be male persons." A smoldering fire flares up into flame occasionally, and this was no exception. A flare-up in late 1974 resulted in the appointment of another committee to reconsider the matter. Its report in January 1975 gave the pros and cons and the comments of other clubs, and arguments were heard from many members. A vote by ballot followed, and the results were 14 votes for admitting women, 35 against and 2 abstaining."

"A chink in the armor occurred that December when the Linnaean Society sent us Helen Hays as their exchange speaker with a talk on Great Gull Island. It was decided to make this meeting a "Ladies Night". The attendance, 70 persons, was at least one-third greater than normal."

"All was relatively quiet until the early 1980s, when the pressure once more became intense. Many able birding couples did not belong to the D.V.O.C. because of the restriction, and other members lost interest because their wives could not accompany them to meetings or on field trips. There was a veiled threat that a new society similar to the D.V.O.C. might be organized which would include both sexes. And there was the undeniable fact, admitted to grudgingly by a few die-hards, that a female birder is just as proficient as a male. After many long and heated discussions, a committee was appointed to propose a change in the Constitution and present it to the membership. This it did on November 4, 1982. The entire meeting was devoted to the debate and vote. The word "male" was deleted from the Constitution by a vote of 57 to 10. The battle was finally won."

"At the annual meeting on January 6, 1983, Kate Brethwaite, Mary Brokaw, Helen McWilliams, Naomi Murphy and Cynthia Uptegraft became the first women elected, soon to be followed by many more."

Sandra L. Sherman served as the first female President of the DVOC, and also the first female editor of Cassinia.

== Notable members ==
- Witmer Stone
- Henry Weed Fowler
- James Bond
- Ludlow Griscom
- Frank Gill
- Rodolphe Meyer de Schauensee

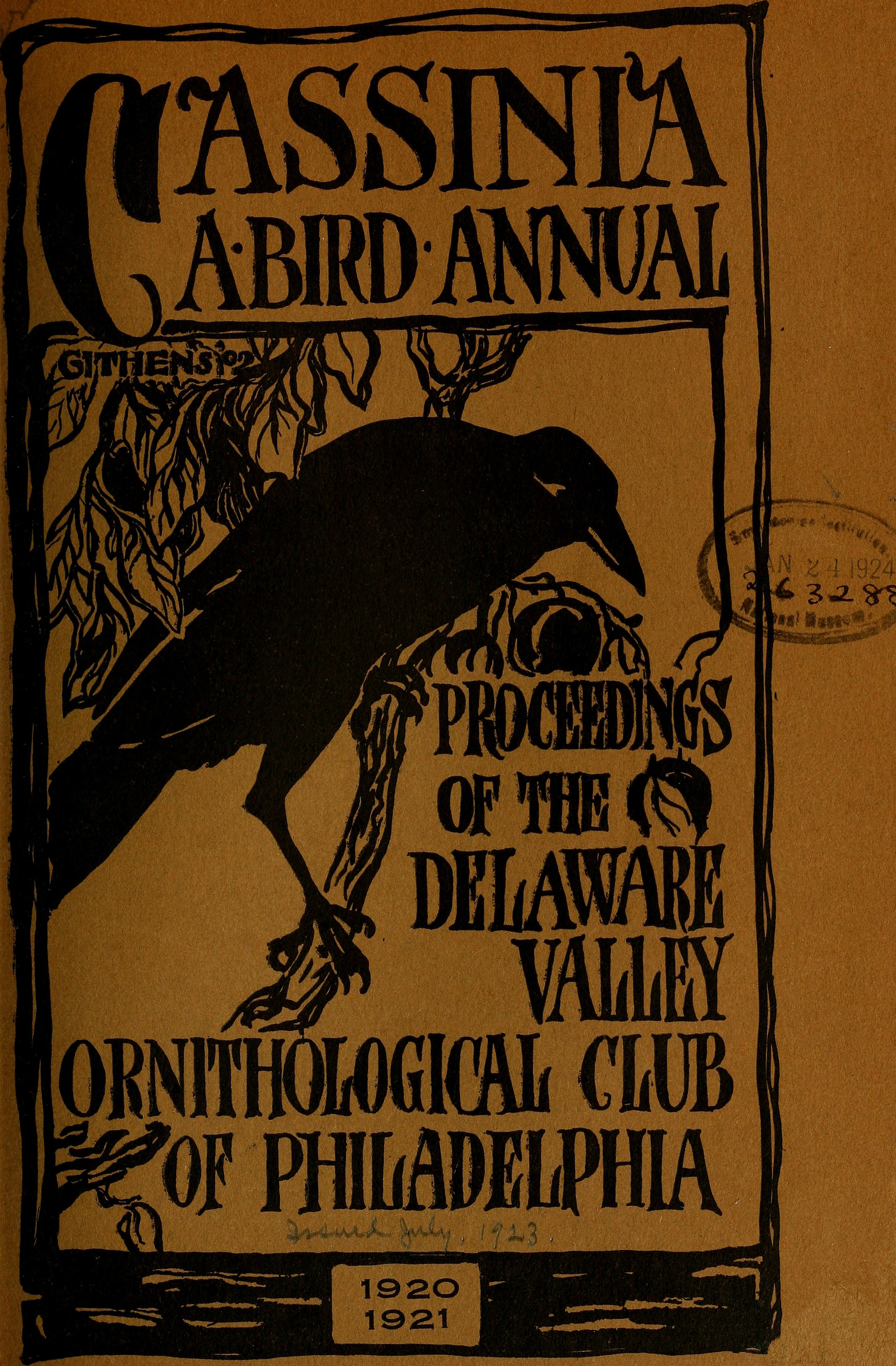
Original cover design by Alfred Morton Githens (1901)

== Publications ==
- Cassinia (1901–present)
- Larus (1974–2008) — a DVOC newsletter
- Proceedings of the Delaware Valley Ornithological Club (1890–1900)
- Bird Studies at Old Cape May: An Ornithology of Coastal New Jersey, by Witmer Stone. 1937.
  - The DVOC initially published 1,400 copies of this definitive two volume set. A reprint was issued in 1965 by Dover Publishing.
- The Birds of Eastern Pennsylvania and New Jersey, by Witmer Stone. 1894.
- Birds of the Pocono Mountains, by Phillips B. Street. 1954.
- Pennsylvania Birds, by Earl Poole. 1964.
- Voices of Birds and Birders, by George Reynard. 1990.
- Checklist of Delaware Valley Birds. 2002.

== Awards ==
The DVOC offers several awards to individuals who have made significant contributions to ornithology and/or to the club, presented at the annual banquet:

- Witmer Stone Award — awarded to one or more DVOC members for the best publication which embodies the results of ornithological research not undertaken in the course of professional duties.
- Julian Potter Award — awarded to one or more DVOC members who have made an outstanding contribution to field ornithology.
- Rosalie Edge Conservation Award — awarded to one or more non-members of the Club who have made a significant contribution to conservation of the environment.
- DEVOC Award — "An occasional honor to that member of the Delaware Valley Ornithological Club who, by his/her outstanding contributions to ornithology, has best exemplified the spirit of the Founders and upheld the prestige which they established for the Club"
