= Cassinia (journal) =

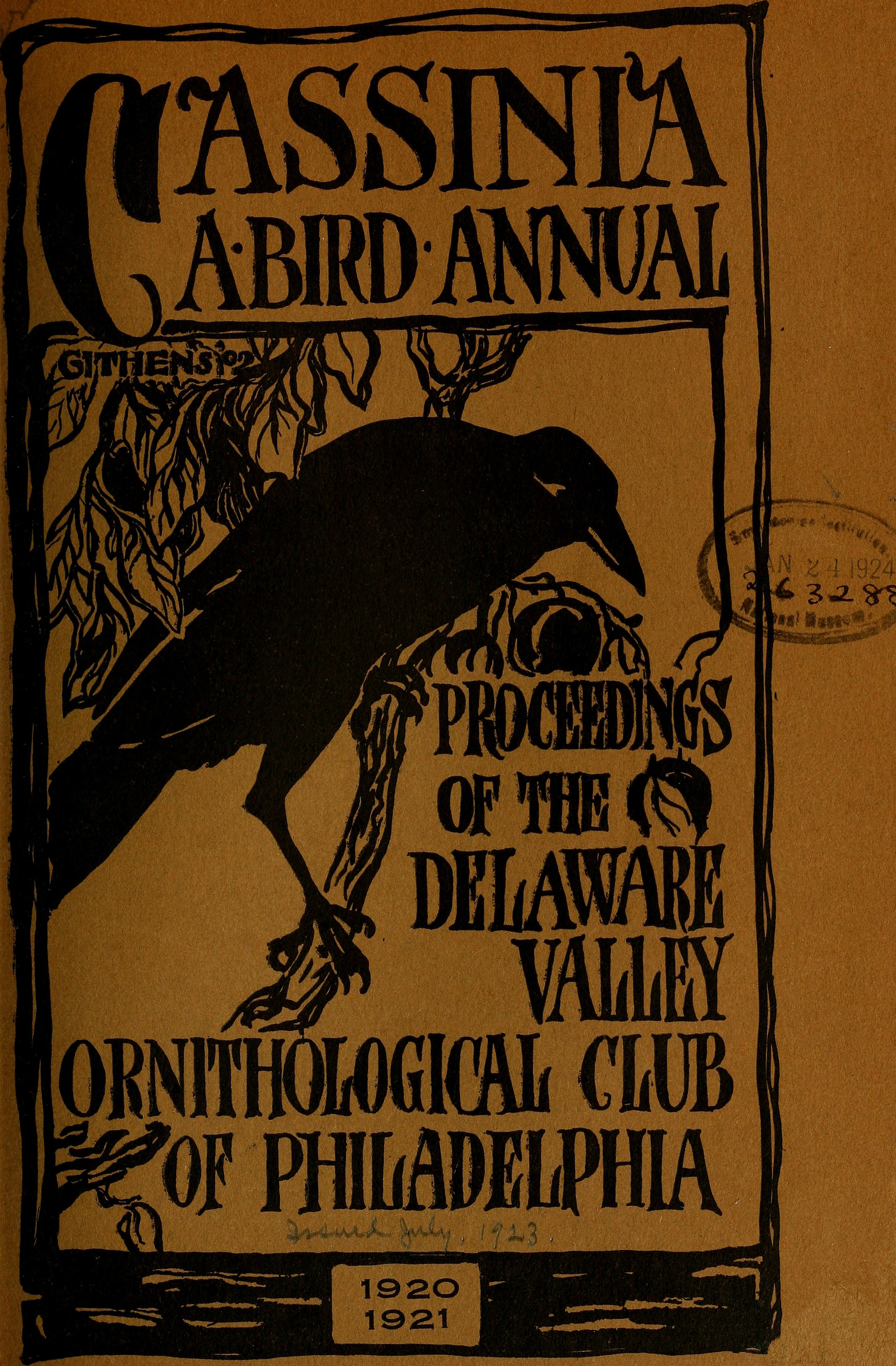
- The original cover design, pictured here, was designed by Alfred Morton Githens in 1901
- Language: English
- Edited by: Matthew R. Halley

Publication details
- Former name(s): Abstract of the Proceedings of the Delaware Valley Ornithological Club
- Publisher: Delaware Valley Ornithological Club

Standard abbreviations
- ISO 4: Cassinia

Indexing
- ISSN: 0095-862X

Links
- Journal homepage

Cassinia is the journal of the Delaware Valley Ornithological Club (DVOC). The journal is composed of papers relating to the ornithology of eastern Pennsylvania, New Jersey, and Delaware. Seventy three issues have been published to date. Five initial volumes (1890–1900) were published under the name Abstract of the Proceedings of the Delaware Valley Ornithological Club, and then in 1901 the journal was renamed in honor of ornithologist John Cassin.

== Editorial History ==
There have been 22 different editors of Cassinia since its inception:

1. Witmer Stone — Vols. 1–14, 1890–1910
2. Robert T. Moore — Vols. 15–19, 1911–1915
3. Spencer Trotter — Vols. 20–24, 1916–1921
4. Wharton Huber — Vol. 25: 1922, 1924
5. Philip A. Livingston — Vols. 26–27, 1925–1928; and Vol. 31, 1938–1941
6. J. Fletcher Street — Vols. 28–29, 1929–1932
7. C. Brooke Worth / Witmer Stone — Vol. 30, 1933–1937
8. Ernest A. Choate — Vols. 32–37, 1942–1948
9. C. Chandler Ross — Vols. 38–42, 1949–1954
10. Lester S. Thomas — Vols. 43–45, 1958–1960
11. James K. Meritt — Vols. 46–49, 1961–1966; and Vols. 51–55, 1968–1975
12. Albert Conway — Vol. 50, 1966–1967
13. Keith C. Richards — Vol. 56, 1976
14. Richard C. Bell — Vols. 57–59, 1977–1981
15. Edward D. Fingerhood — Vols. 60–62, 1982–1987
16. Franklin C. Haas — Vols. 63–66, 1988–1995
17. Sandra L. Sherman — Vols. 67–68, 1996–1999
18. Colin Campbell — Vol. 69, 2000–2001
19. F. Arthur McMorris — Vols. 70–71, 2002–2005
20. Dave B. Long — Vols. 72/73–74/75, 2006–2015
21. Matthew R. Halley — Vols. 76–77, 2016–2019
22. Holger Pflicke — current
