= Janet Coggin =

British writer

- Born: 3 April 1936; Cambridge, Cambridgeshire, England
- Died: 23 September 2010 (aged 74); West Linton, Scotland
- Occupations: Novelist; Memoirist

Janet Coggin (3 April 1936 – 23 September 2010) was a British novelist and memoirist.

== Early life ==
Coggin was born in Cambridge in 1936 to Maurice Coggin and his wife Eleanora (née Illeris). Her mother was a member of the SOE during WWII. Her aunt, Joan Coggin, was a detective and children's novelist in the 1940s.

Coggin grew up in Totnes. Her parents divorced, and in 1949 her mother remarried, to Maj Franklin Lushington. In 1964 Col (as he was by then) Lushington was killed in a car accident; Eleanora Lushington died later the same year at their home in Spain. Brought up by her pacifist father, Coggin attended the progressive Dartington Hall School.

== Dieter Gerhardt ==
In the late 1950s, Coggin met a South African naval officer, Dieter Gerhardt, at a wedding in Devon. In 1957 they were married. They had three children.

In 1966, after eight years of marriage, Gerhardt took her aside and informed her that he was a KGB spy and, indeed, had been one since before they had met. She immediately ended the marriage, and returned to Europe on the next available passage, with her three children. She then lived in Ireland for some years, terrified of being murdered by the KGB. She rented a flat in the Crosthwaite Park area in Dún Laoghaire, working in a variety of jobs to make ends meet. She subsequently taught English in Greece and, returning to Ireland, worked in the Camphill Community, a training college for children with learning difficulties in Naas.

In 1983 Gerhardt and his second wife were arrested, and subsequently imprisoned for treason.

== Literary career ==
Her literary output consisted of four novels and two memoirs, most notably a lightly fictionalised account of her marriage to a KGB spy, The Spy's Wife.

== List of works ==
=== Novels ===
- The Leaving (1988: Robert Hale).
- The Bread Man (1989: Robert Hale).
- McElhinney (1989: Robert Hale).
- Northside (1990: Robert Hale).

=== Memoirs ===
- The Spy's Wife (1998: Constable).
- High Tide and the Heron Dived: A Totnes Childhood (2012: Folly Island Press).

== Personal life ==
Her second husband was Costas Balis, who died in 2004. She died in West Linton, in Scotland, in 2010, aged 74.
