= John Cassin =

American ornithologist (1813–1869)

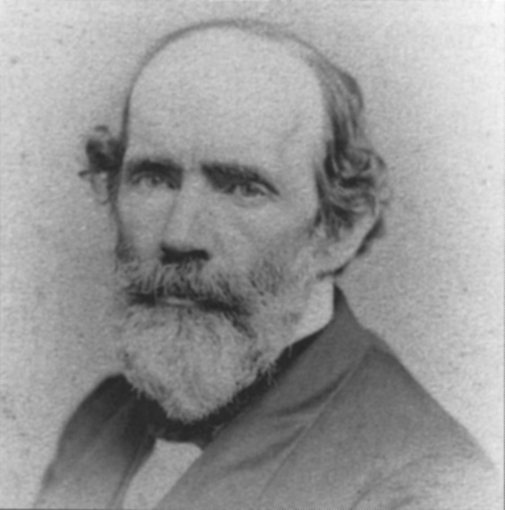
- Born: September 6, 1813; Upper Providence Township, Pennsylvania, U.S.
- Died: 10 January 1869 (aged 55); Philadelphia, Pennsylvania, U.S.
- Resting place: Laurel Hill Cemetery, Philadelphia, Pennsylvania, U.S.
- Known for: Curator of the Philadelphia Academy of Natural Sciences (1842-1869); Author of several books describing 194 new species birds
- Scientific career
- Fields: Ornithology, Naturalist
- Author abbrev. (zoology): Cassin

John Cassin (September 6, 1813 – January 10, 1869) was an American ornithologist from Pennsylvania. He worked as curator and vice president at the Philadelphia Academy of Natural Sciences and focused on the systemic classification of the academy's extensive collection of birds. He was one of the founders of the Delaware County Institute of Science and published several books describing 194 new species of birds. Five species of North American birds, a cicada, and a mineral are named in his honor.

== Early life and education ==
Cassin was born in Upper Providence Township, Pennsylvania on September 6, 1813. He was educated at the Westtown School in Westtown Township, Pennsylvania. His great Uncle, John Cassin, was a commodore in the U.S. Navy and served in the War of 1812.

He served in the Union Army during the American Civil War and was held prisoner in the infamous Confederate Libby Prison in Richmond, Virginia.

== Career ==
Cassin moved to Philadelphia in 1834 and became the head of a lithographing business in which many of his illustrations of birds were later printed. He served for a brief time in the Philadelphia City Council. He was a member of the Zoological Society, the American Philosophical Society and the Pennsylvania Historical Society.

In 1833, Cassin, along with 4 colleagues, founded the Delaware County Institute of Science in Media, Pennsylvania.

In 1842, he was elected curator of the Philadelphia Academy of Natural Sciences. From 1846 to 1850, Thomas Bellerby Wilson, a wealthy patron of the academy, became interested in the department of ornithology and procured a collection of over 25,000 birds. The academy had the largest ornithological collection in the United States at the time and included an extensive collection of non-North American species. This exceptional collection of birds allowed Cassin to become the leading ornithological taxonomist in the world.

Cassin worked almost exclusively at the academy, focused on research and the systematic classification of species rather than field work. He described 194 new species of birds and revised a number of families in the academy's publications. His publications include Birds of California, with descriptions and colored engravings of fifty species; Synopsis of the Birds of North America; Ornithology of the United States Exploring Expedition; Ornithology of the Japan Expedition; Ornithology of Gillis's Astronomical Expedition to Chile; and chapters on raptorial birds and waders in Ornithology of the Pacific Railroad Explorations and Surveys. He also co-authored Birds of North America (1860) with Spencer Fullerton Baird and George Newbold Lawrence.

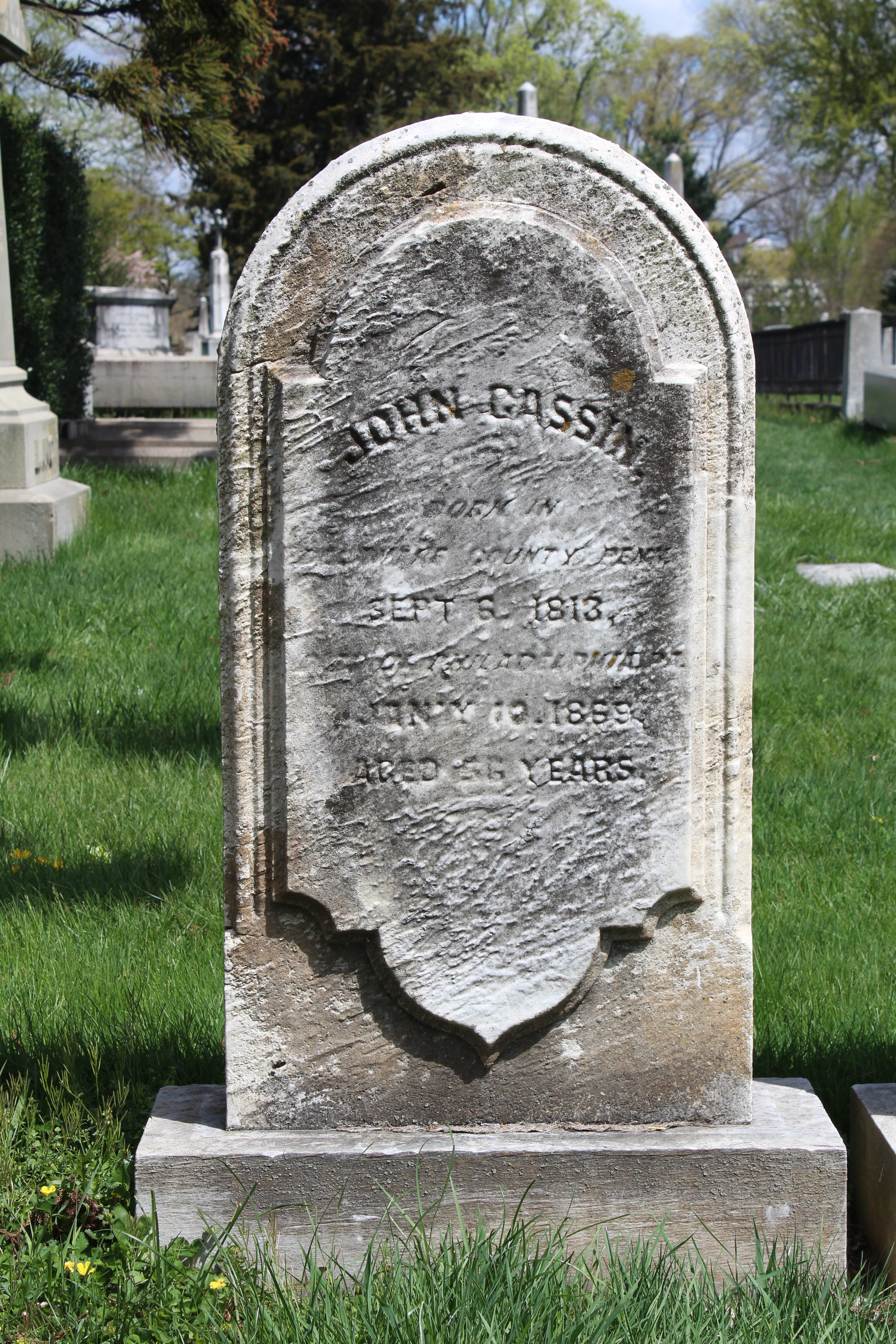
John Cassin gravestone in Laurel Hill Cemetery

Specimens collected from the Pacific Railroad Surveys and the Mexican Boundary Surveys were sent to the academy and further supplemented the collection. Cassin helped revise the publications that arose from these surveys.

Martha Maxwell was a student of Cassin at the Academy of Natural Sciences from 1862 to 1869.

Cassin was elected vice president of the Academy of Natural Sciences in 1864.

He died in 1869 of arsenic poisoning caused by his handling of bird skins preserved with arsenic. His collection of 4,300 birds was purchased for $500, equivalent to $12,094 in 2025 dollars, by John Whipple Potter Jenks for Brown University's museum of natural history.

He is buried at Laurel Hill Cemetery in Philadelphia.

== Legacy ==
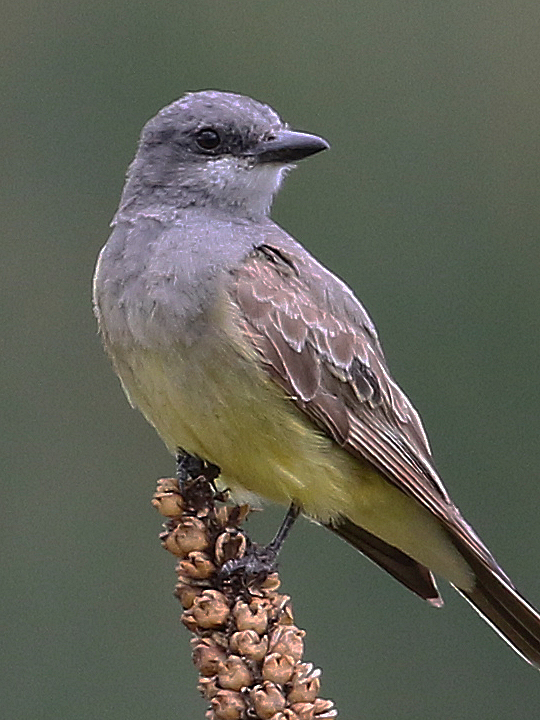
Cassin's Kingbird

Five birds from North America are named in his honor: the Cassin's auklet, Cassin's kingbird, Cassin's vireo, Cassin's sparrow, and Cassin's finch. The periodic cicada Magicicada cassini and the mineral orthoclase variety cassinite are also named for him.

In 1901, the journal of the Delaware Valley Ornithological Club was renamed Cassinia in his honor.

== Bibliography ==
- Catalogue of the caprimulgidae in the Collection of the Academy of Natural Sciences of Philadelphia, Philadelphia, Academy of Natural Sciences of Philadelphia, 1851
- Illustrations of the Birds of California, Texas, Oregon, British, and Russian America. Philadelphia: J. B. Lippincott & Co., 1856
- United States Exploring Expedition. During the Years 1838, 1839, 1840, 1841, 1842. Under the Command of Charles Wilkins, U.S.N., Philadelphia, C. Sherman & Son, 1858
