= Barrett (surname) =

Barrett is a surname of Norman origin, now found commonly in England and Ireland due to the Norman Invasion; its meaning translates loosely to "warlike" or "troublesome".

== People with the surname ==
=== A ===
- A. Igoni Barrett (born 1979), Nigerian author
- Alex Barrett (born 1994), American football player
- Alexander Barrett (1866–1954), English cricketer
- Alice Barrett (born 1956), American actress
- Amy Coney Barrett (born 1972), Associate Justice of the U.S. Supreme Court
- Andre Barrett (born 1982), American basketball player
- Andrea Barrett (born 1954), American novelist
- Anthony Barrett (born 1952), British chemist
- Anthony A. Barrett (born 1941), British-Canadian classical scholar
- Arthur Barrett (cricketer) (1944–2018), West Indian cricketer
- Aston "Family Man" Barrett (1946–2024), Jamaican musician
- Aston Barrett Jr. (born 1990), Jamaican multi-instrumentalist and producer

=== B ===
- Barbara Barrett (born 1950), 25th U.S. Secretary of the Air Force and former U.S. Ambassador to Finland
- Beauden Barrett (born 1991), New Zealand rugby union player
- Becky Barrett (1942–2024), Canadian politician
- Bill Barrett (1929–2016), Nebraska politician
- Bob Barrett (American football) (born 1935), American football player
- Bob Barrett (baseball) (1899–1982), American baseball infielder
- Brendon Ryan Barrett (born 1986), American actor

=== C ===
- Ciarán Bairéad (1905–1976), Irish scholar
- Carlton Barrett (1950–1987), Jamaican musician
- Chad Barrett (born 1985), American professional soccer player
- Charles D. Barrett (1885–1943), Major General in the United States Marine Corps
- Charles F. Barrett (1861–1946), Adjutant General of Oklahoma
- Charles Golding Barrett (1836–1904), English lepidopterist
- Charles Leslie Barrett (1870–1959), Australian natural history writer
- Charley Barrett (1893–1924), American football player
- Coleman Barrett (born 1982), Irish boxer
- Colin Barrett (footballer) (born 1952), English footballer
- Colleen Barrett (1944–2024), American business executive
- Craig Barrett (disambiguation), multiple people

=== D ===
- Daniel Barrett (disambiguation), multiple people
- David Barrett (disambiguation), multiple people
- Dicky Barrett (born 1964), American singer
- Deirdre Barrett, author and psychologist who teaches at Harvard Medical School
- Duncan Barrett (born 1983), English author

=== E ===
- Eaton Stannard Barrett (1786–1820), Irish author and poet
- Edith Helen Barrett (1872–1939), Australian medical doctor
- Edward Barrett (Irish sportsman) (1877–1932), Irish Olympic athlete
- Edward Barrett (Medal of Honor) (born 1855, date of death unknown), American second class fireman
- Elizabeth Barrett Browning (1806–1861), English poet
- Ellen Barrett (born 1946), American priest
- Emmett Barrett (1916–2005), American football player
- Eugene Barrett (1931–2003), American serial killer

=== F ===
- Francis Barrett (disambiguation), multiple people
- Franklyn Barrett (1873–1964), Australian film director and cinematographer
- Fred Barrett (disambiguation), multiple people

=== G ===
- Gabby Barrett (born 2002), American singer and 2018 runner-up of American Idol TV talent competition
- George Barret Sr. (c. 1730–1784), Irish landscape painter
- George Barret Jr. (1767–1842), English landscape painter, son of George Barret Sr.
- George Barrett (actuary) (1752–1821), English actuary
- George Barrett (jockey) (1863–1898), English jockey
- George F. Barrett (1907–1980), Illinois Attorney General
- George S. Barrett, American health business executive
- George W. Barrett (c. 1881–1936), a murderer called Diamond King
- Gerard Barrett (runner) (born 1956), Australian Olympic runner
- Gerard Barrett (director), Irish film director
- Giles Leonard Barrett (c. 1744–1809), English and American actor
- Grace Barrett (1897–1979), birth name of American actress Gretchen Hartman
- Graham Barrett (born 1981), Irish professional footballer

=== H ===
- H. Gordon Barrett (1915–1993), Canadian politician

=== J ===
- J. Gresham Barrett (born 1961), American politician
- Jacinda Barrett (born 1972), Australian actress
- Jack Barrett (disambiguation), multiple people
- Jake Barrett (born 1991), American baseball pitcher
- James Barrett (disambiguation), multiple people
- Jeffrey A. Barrett (born 1964), American philosopher
- Jo Jo Barrett (1943–2021), Irish Gaelic football player and manager
- Joe Barrett (1902–1952), Gaelic footballer
- John Barrett (disambiguation), multiple people
- Jordan Barrett (born 1996), Australian fashion model
- Jordie Barrett (born 1997), New Zealand rugby union player
- J. T. Barrett (born 1995), American football player
- Justin Barrett (born 1971), Irish politician
- Justin L. Barrett (born 1971), psychologist

=== K ===
- Kane Barrett (born 1990), New Zealand rugby union player
- Kate Waller Barrett (1857–1925), American physician and social reformer

=== L ===
- Lawrence Barrett (1838–1891), American actor
- Lee and Oli Barrett, British social media personalities based in China
- Leonard E. Barrett (1920–2007), Jamaican academic
- Lillian Barrett (1884–1963), American novelist and playwright
- Lindsay Barrett (born 1941), Jamaican-Nigerian author
- Linton Lomas Barrett (1904–1972), American diplomat and translator
- Lorraine Barrett (born 1950), Welsh politician
- Lucas Barrett (1837–1862), English geologist
- Lynne Barrett, American author

=== M ===
- Mario (singer) (Mario Barrett; born 1986), singer/actor/dancer
- Majel Barrett (1932–2008), American actress
- Malcolm Barrett (actor) (born 1980), American actor
- Marcia Barrett (born 1948), Jamaican-British singer in Boney M.
- Marty Barrett (second baseman) (born 1958), American baseball player
- Martyn Barrett (born 1951), British social scientist
- Mathias Barrett (1900–1990), Irish monk
- Michael Barrett (disambiguation), multiple people
- Monte Barrett (born 1971), professional boxer
- Matthew Barrett (born 2011),

=== N ===
- Nancy Barrett (born 1943), American actress
- Nathan Barrett (disambiguation), multiple people
- Nathaniel Barrett (1861–1933), American physician and politician
- Neal Barrett Jr. (1929–2014), American writer
- Neil Barrett (disambiguation), multiple people
- Nessa Barrett (born 2002), American singer-songwriter
- Nick Barrett (born 1988), New Zealand rugby union footballer
- Nick Barrett (American football) (born 2003), American football player
- Norman Barrett (1903–1979), Australian-born British surgeon who first described Barrett's oesophagus in 1957

=== O ===
- Otis Barrett (1872–1950), American agriculturalist
- Oliver Barrett (1986-Present)

=== P ===
- Pam Barrett (1953–2008), Canadian politician
- Pat Barrett (wrestler) (1941–2021), Irish professional wrestler
- Pat Barrett (boxer) (born 1967), British boxer
- Patrick Barrett (d. 1415), Irish bishop
- Paul Barrett (1940–2019), Welsh music manager and producer
- Peter Barrett (bishop) (1956–2015), Church of Ireland bishop

=== R ===
- Rachel Barrett (1874–1953), British editor and suffragette
- Rafael Barrett (1876–1910), Spanish journalist and political activist who relocated to Paraguay
- Ray Barrett (1927–2009), Australian actor
- Red Barrett (1915–1990), MLB pitcher
- Reginald Barrett (born 1944), Australian judge
- Richard Barrett (disambiguation), multiple people
- RJ Barrett (born 2000), Canadian basketball player
- Robbie Barrett (born 1992), British boxer
- Robert G. Barrett (1942–2012), Australian author
- Ron Barrett (born 1937), American illustrator, author and puzzle maker
- Rona Barrett (born 1936), American gossip columnist not born as or married to a Barrett
- Ronnie Barrett (born 1954), founder of Barrett Firearms Manufacturing
- Rowan Barrett (born 1972), Canadian basketball player and executive
- Ryan Barrett (born 1982), English boxer

=== S ===
- Scott Barrett (rugby union) (born 1993), New Zealand rugby union player
- Sean Barrett (disambiguation), multiple people
- Sidney F. Barrett (1892–1958), philatelist of New York City
- Slim Barrett (born 1960s), Irish jewellery designer and artist
- Stanton Barrett (born 1972), American stuntman and racing driver
- Syd Barrett (1946–2006), real name Roger Barrett, early Pink Floyd frontman
- Sylvester Barrett (1926–2002), Irish politician

=== T ===
- Ted Barrett (born 1965), MLB umpire
- Theobald Butler Barrett (1894–1969), Canadian politician
- Thomas Barrett (disambiguation), multiple people
- Tina Barrett (born 1976), former member of pop group S Club 7
- Trent Barrett (born 1977), Australian Rugby League player

=== V ===
- Veronica Grace Boland, née Barrett (1899–1982), first female member of Congress from Pennsylvania

=== W ===
- Wade Barrett (born 1980), ring name of English professional wrestler Stu Bennett (born 1980)
- Wade Barrett (soccer) (born 1976), American soccer player
- Warren Barrett (born 1970), Jamaican professional footballer
- Wayne Barrett (1945–2017), journalist for the Village Voice
- William Spencer Barrett (W. S. Barrett) (1914–2001), English classical scholar known for his commentary on Euripides' Hippolytus
- Willie Barrett, Irish hurling referee
- Wild Willy Barrett (born 1950), musician
- Wilson Barrett (1846–1904), English actor

=== Z ===
- Zelfa Barrett (born 1993), British boxer

== See also ==
- Barrat, a surname
- Barratt (surname)
