= John Barrett =

John Barrett or Johnny Barrett may refer to:

== Clergy ==
- John Barrett (bishop) (1878–1946), British clergyman who held high office in the Roman Catholic Church
- John Barrett (dean of Clonmacnoise) (1929–1996), Irish Anglican priest
- John Barrett (Hebrew scholar) (1753–1821), Irish Anglican priest
- John C. A. Barrett (born 1943), Chairman of the World Methodist Council and educator

== Military personnel ==
- John Barrett (Irish soldier) (died 1693), Irish colonel in the Williamite war
- John Barrett (Royal Navy officer) (died 1810), Irish captain in the Royal Navy
- John Cridlan Barrett (1897–1977), English recipient of the Victoria Cross

== Politicians ==
- John Barrett (Australian politician) (1858–1928), Australian senator
- John Barrett (Massachusetts politician) (born 1947), American legislator and former mayor of North Adams
- John Barrett (Missouri politician) (1915–2000), American legislator
- John Barrett (Scottish politician) (born 1954), Scottish Liberal Democrat politician and the former Member of Parliament for Edinburgh West
- John Barrett Jr. (born 1944), Citizen Potawatomi Nation chairman

== Scholars ==
- John Barrett (energy researcher), British energy and climate change scientist
- John Barrett (Hebrew scholar) (1753–1821), Irish Anglican priest
- John C. Barrett (1949–2024), British archaeologist
- John W. Barrett (mathematician), British mathematician
- John W. Barrett (physicist), British mathematical physicist

== Sportpeople ==
- John Barrett (American football) (1899–1966), American football player
- John Barrett (athlete) (1879–1942), Irish track and field athlete
- John Barrett (Australian footballer) (1928–2023), Australian rules footballer
- John Barrett (cricketer) (born 1946), English cricketer
- John Barrett (ice hockey) (born 1958), Canadian NHL defenceman
- John Barrett (outfielder) (fl. 1872), American baseball outfielder
- John Barrett (tennis) (born 1931), English tennis player and commentator
- John Barrett (volleyball) (born 1962), Canadian volleyball player
- Johnny Barrett (American football) (1895–1974), American football player
- Johnny Barrett (baseball) (1915–1974), American baseball player

== Others ==
- John Barrett (actor) (1910–1983), British actor
- John Barrett (conservationist) (1913–1999), British conservationist, author and broadcaster
- John Barrett (diplomat) (1866–1938), United States ambassador to Siam, Argentina, Panama, and Colombia
- John Barrett (salon), the brand of beauty and hair salons by hairstylist John Barrett
- John Barrett, frontman of the band Bass Drum of Death
- John F. Barrett (born 1949), CEO of Western & Southern Financial Group

== See also ==
- Jack Barrett (disambiguation)
- John Barret (disambiguation)
- John Barrett Kerfoot (1816–1881), American bishop
