= Thomas Barrett =

Thomas or Tom Barrett may refer to:

== Sports ==
- Tom Barrett (baseball) (born 1960), former baseball player
- Tom Barrett (footballer) (1934–2014), English footballer
- Tom Barrett (ice hockey) (died 1996), Canadian ice hockey coach
- Tom Barrett (riding mechanic) (1891–1924), motor-racing riding-mechanic

== Others ==
- Tom Barrett (Michigan politician) (born 1981), member of the U.S. House of Representatives from Michigan
- Tom Barrett (Wisconsin politician) (born 1953), U.S. Ambassador to Luxembourg and former mayor of Milwaukee, Wisconsin
- Thomas Barrett, several baronets of the Barrett-Lennard baronets
- Thomas Barrett (bishop) (died c. 1485), Irish bishop of Annaghdown
- Thomas Barrett (convict) (c. 1758–1788), creator of the Charlotte Medal and the first person executed in the colony of New South Wales, Australia
- Thomas J. Barrett (born 1947), American Coast Guard admiral and U.S. Deputy Secretary of Transportation
- Tomás Bairéad (anglicised: Thomas Barrett; 1893–1973), Irish author and nationalist
- Leslie Stuart (born Thomas Barrett; 1863–1928), English composer
- T. L. Barrett (born 1944), American minister and gospel musician
- T. W. Barrett (1851–1935), English music hall comedian and singer

== See also ==
- Thomas Barratt (disambiguation)
- Thomas Barritt (1743–1820), British antiquary
- Thomas Baret (died 1396), English MP
