= Bridget Barrett =

Irish murder victim (died 1845)

Bridget Barrett (died 10 September 1845) was an Irish woman who was murdered in County Galway. Her murder attracted great notoriety at the time, and was "the subject of the first Coroner's inquest held in Connemara proper and led to two men being charged with wilful murder on the high seas."

== Overview ==
Barrett had a sexual relationship with James Mannion of Letterard, which resulted in the birth of their child in July 1845. His aunt put pressure upon him to fulfill his promise of marriage to Barrett. Mannion reportedly arranged to meet Barrett on the evening of 10 September and go with her to Roundstone so that they could get married. Although Mannion swore her to secrecy, Barrett told her sister about the plan.

On 10 September a witness saw the couple, along with a man named Thomas Cosgriff, take a boat from a place called Ruananule. This was the last time that anyone other than Mannion and Cosgriff saw Barrett alive. Some other witnesses in the area testified to hearing a woman's cries at some point in the night. Some days later Mannion was seen in Galway some days later buying clothes; Barrett's sister spoke to him but obtained no good answer as to the whereabouts of her sister.

Barrett's body was finally washed up on the shore at Roundstone on 16 November 1845. Her hands and feet were missing, and it was later found that this was because she had been weighted down with an anchor, the decomposition thus separating the body parts.

James Mannion was aged twenty-two when convicted of murder on 5 August 1846. His death sentence was reduced to transportation for life but he died in prison whilst awaiting transportation, on 30 September 1847.

Thomas Cosgriff was found guilty of murder some time later, and it appears that there were some legal disagreements as to the extent of his guilt. He was transported to Australia on the ship Bangalore. The Convict Register records that an order was given for his discharge on 4 June 1854.

== See also ==
- Ciáran Bairéad
- Thomás Bairéad
- Tomás Bairéad
- Coleman Barrett
- Francie Barrett
- Slim Barrett
