= Ciarán Bairéad =

Irish folklorist and scribe

Ciarán Bairéad (1905–1976) was an Irish folklorist, scribe and scholar.

Ciarán Bairéad was born into a native Irish speaking family in Dublin on 17 February 1905. His parents were Siobhán Ní Mhurchú and Stiofán Bairéad (1867-1921), the first treasurer of Conradh na Gaeilge. Ciáran Bairéad came to Galway in the mid-1950s working with the Irish Folklore Commission and An Fáinne, an organisation which promoted Irish. Among his works was the transcriptions of Leabhar na nAmhrán, a duanaire of folksongs by Pádhraic Ó Comáin. It is especially valuable as the original appears to be misplaced. In addition he wrote detailed biographies of the lives and works of other scholars in the Gaelic Revival such as Seosamh Laoide.

He also conducted interviews with locals of the parish concerning accounts of the 1504 Battle of Knockdoe, on placenames, faction fights and the current use of Irish. Among those interviews were Micheál Ó Síoda and Séan Ó Loirgneáin. Ciarán Bairéad lived in Lackagh, Co Galway for over twenty years. He died on 18 August 1976 and is buried in Claregalway Cemetery. His papers are held in the National University of Ireland, Galway.

== See also ==
- Thomás Bairéad
- Tomás Bairéad
- Bridget Barrett
- Coleman Barrett
- Francie Barrett
- Slim Barrett
