= Thomas Barratt =

Thomas Barratt may refer to:

- Thomas Barratt (VC) (1895–1917), English recipient of the Victoria Cross
- Thomas Ball Barratt (1862–1940), Norwegian pastor
- Thomas J. Barratt (1841–1914), chairman of the soap manufacturer A&F Pears and pioneer of brand marketing

== See also ==
- Thomas Barrett (disambiguation)
- Thomas Barritt (1743–1820), British antiquary
- Thomas Baret, English member of parliament
