= Senator Barrett =

Senator Barrett may refer to:

- Bill Barrett (1929–2016), Nebraska State Senate
- Dan Barrett (politician) (fl. 2000s–2010s), North Carolina State Senate
- Debby Barrett (fl. 2000s–2010s), Montana State Senate
- Elisha T. Barrett (1902–1966), New York State Senate
- Frank A. Barrett (1892–1962), U.S. Senator from Wyoming from 1953 to 1959
- James Barrett (Vermont judge) (1814–1900), Vermont State Senate
- John Barrett (Missouri politician) (1915–2000), Missouri State Senate
- Michael J. Barrett (born 1948), Massachusetts State Senate
- Tom Barrett (Michigan politician) (born 1981), Michigan State Senate
- Tom Barrett (Wisconsin politician) (born 1953), Wisconsin State Senate
- William N. Barrett (1855–1916), Oregon State Senate

== See also ==
- Elizabeth Barrett-Anderson (born 1953), Senate of Guam
