= Francis Barrett =

Francis or Frank Barrett may refer to:

- Francis Barrett (occultist) (c. 1780–after 1802), English occult writer
- Francis Thornton Barrett (1838–1919), British librarian
- Frank Barrett (footballer) (1872–1907), Scottish football goalkeeper
- Frank Barrett (Irish republican) (1892–1931), Irish officer during War of Independence and Irish Civil War
- Frank A. Barrett (1892–1962), American soldier, lawyer and politician
- Frank Barrett (baseball) (1913–1998), pitcher
- Frank Barrett (writer) (born 1953), British writer
- Francie Barrett (born 1977), Irish boxer
