= Dick Barrett =

Dick Barrett may refer to:

- Dick Barrett (baseball) (1906–1966), pitcher in Major League Baseball
- Richard Barrett (Irish republican) (1889–1922), known as Dick, Irish Republican Army volunteer executed in 1922 during the Irish Civil War
- Dick Barrett (politician) (born 1942), Democratic member of the Montana Legislature
- Dicky Barrett (trader), (1807–1847), New Zealand settler and trader

== See also ==
- Richard Barrett (disambiguation)
