= Seán Ó Loirgneáin =

- Military career
- Units: Irish Volunteers; Irish Republican Army
- Conflicts: Easter uprising

Seán Ó Loirgneáin (fl. 1914-1951) was a member of the Irish Volunteers and Irish Republican Army.

Ó Loirgneáin was a native of Parkgarve, Claregalway. He participated in the Galway Easter Rising of 1916, serving under Captain Tom Ruane of Grealishtown. He fought at the battle of Carnmore, which was the first engagement of the Galway rising. Volunteer companies from Claregalway, Castlegar and Carnmore participated against six truckloads of British army units Royal Irish Constabulary. The company moved to the farmyard at the Agricultural College outside Athenry, which had already been seized by the local brigade. He was present at the occupation of Moyode Castle, and dispersed when the failure of the rebellion in Dublin became known.

In 1951 he was interviewed by the folklorist Ciáran Bairéad. Copies of his reminisinces are kept at the Department of Irish Folklore at University College Dublin.
