= John Cridlan Barrett =

English military officer (1897–1977); recipient of the Victoria Cross

- Born: 10 August 1897; Leamington Spa, Warwickshire, England
- Died: 7 March 1977 (aged 79); Leicester, Leicestershire, England
- Military career
- Allegiance: United Kingdom
- Branch: British Army
- Service years: 1916−1945
- Rank: Colonel
- Service number: 21885
- Units: Leicestershire Regiment; Royal Army Medical Corps
- Commands: 5th Battalion, Leicestershire Regiment; 1/5th Battalion, Leicestershire Regiment
- Conflicts: World War I: Western Front; Hundred Days Offensive (WIA); World War II
- Awards: Victoria Cross; Territorial Decoration
- Other work: Surgeon

Colonel John Cridlan Barrett VC, TD (10 August 1897 – 7 March 1977) was an English recipient of the Victoria Cross, the highest and most prestigious award for gallantry in the face of the enemy that can be awarded to British and Commonwealth forces.

Barrett was 21 years old, and a lieutenant in the 1/5th Battalion, The Leicestershire Regiment, British Army during the First World War when the following deed took place for which he was awarded the VC.

On 24 September 1918 at Pontruet, France, during an attack, owing to the darkness and smoke barrage, Lieutenant Barrett found himself advancing towards a trench containing numerous machine-guns. He at once collected all available men and charged the nearest group of guns and in spite of being wounded, gained the trench, personally disposing of two machine-guns and inflicting many casualties. Notwithstanding a second wound he then climbed out of the trench to fix his position and locate the enemy, then ordered his men to cut their way back to the battalion, which they did. He was again wounded, very seriously.

He later became a surgeon at Leicester Royal Infirmary and achieved the rank of colonel after serving in the Royal Army Medical Corps in World War II.

== Medal ==
His VC is on display at the Royal Leicestershire Regiment Museum Collection in the Newarke Houses Museum, Leicester.
