= Micheál Ó Síoda =

Micheál Ó Síoda (fl. 1909-1951) was an Irish scribe and folklorist.

Ó Síoda was a native of Carnmore, and knowledgeable about the history of the parish of Lackagh-Turloughmore in County Galway. He was an especial authority on the Fair of Turloughmore, and its accompanying faction fights. Much of his material has found its way into print in local history books.

In 1909 he wrote a book called Leabhar na nAmhrán, which included handwritten songs received from Pádhraic Ó Comáin of Cregmore. A copy, by Ciarán Bairéad, is kept at the Department of Irish Folklore at University College Dublin, along with interviews of Ó Síoda.
