= Robert Critoph =

British academic

Professor Robert Critoph is a British academic in the field of mechanical engineering, working on heating and cooling technologies and energy demand. Critoph is Director of the Interdisciplinary Centre for Storage, Transformation and Upgrading of Thermal Energy (i-STUTE). I-STUTE is one of six End Use Energy Demand Centres.

== Academic career ==
Critoph has worked on sorption heat pump and refrigeration systems since 1982 and has published 89 papers, 2 book chapters, 5 patents and managed research contracts for industry, national government and EU totaling more than £10M. He has taught courses in heat transfer, thermodynamics and renewable energy. Industrial clients have included British Gas, Searle, and Unilever.

== Selected publications ==
- Tamainot-Telto, Z., Metcalf, S.J., Critoph, R.E., Zhong, Y. & Thorpe, R. (2009) Carbon–ammonia pairs for adsorption refrigeration applications: ice making, air conditioning and heat pumping. International Journal of Refrigeration. Volume 32, Issue 6, pp. 1212-1229.
- Zhong, Y., Critoph, R.E., Thorpe, R.N., Tamainot-Telto Z. and Aristov, Yu.I. (2006) Isothermal sorption characteristics of the BaCl2-NH3 pair in a vermiculite host matrix. Applied Thermal Engineering. Volume 27, pp. 2455-2462.
- Wang, L.W., Tamainot-Telto, Z., Metcalf, S.J., Critoph, R.E. & Wang, R.Z. (2010) Anisotropic thermal conductivity and permeability of compacted expanded natural graphite. Volume 30, Issue 13, pp. 1805-1811.
