= Tadj Oreszczyn =

British professor

Tadj Oreszczyn is the Director of The Bartlett School of Environment, Energy and Resources, and Director of the RCUK Centre for Energy Epidemiology (one of six End Use Energy Demand Centres). He is also Professor of Energy and Environment (and was the founding Director) at the UCL Energy Institute, University College London.

== Academic career ==
Oreszczyn has for over 30 years undertaken energy and building research with a particular focus around the performance gap between theory and practice and the unintended consequences (health, comfort, etc.) of building energy efficiency. His first degree was in Applied Physics followed by a PhD in Solar Energy.

== Publications ==
Oreszczyn has been involved in over 170 research publications. He has given evidence to the House of Lords Science and Technology Select Committee on Energy Efficiency, co-authored two papers for special issues of the Lancet on Energy and Health and prepared three papers for a State of Science Review for the Office of Science and Innovation. He has provided research support for the development of the English and Welsh Building Regulations and presented at invited public and academic lectures at the Royal Society and the Royal Institution.

== Affiliations ==
Oreszczyn was a member of the UK Department of Energy and Climate Change (DECC) Scientific Advisory Group and advised the Energy Efficiency Deployment Office at DECC. He is a member of the NHBC Foundation Expert Panel, and a member of EDGE an inter-institutional ginger group involving CIBSE, ICE, RIBA, IStructE and the RICS which seeks to promote interdisciplinary co-operation between construction professionals. Oreszczyn is a Fellow and Vice President of CIBSE and sits on the CIBSE Board.
