= David Barrett =

Dave Barrett (1930–2018) is the former Premier of British Columbia, Canada.

David Barrett may also refer to:

- Dave Barrett (journalist) (1955–2018), American radio journalist at CBS Radio News
- David Barrett (American football) (born 1977), American football cornerback
- David Barrett (director), American television director and producer
- David Barrett (prosecutor)
- David Barrett (musician) (born 1973), American blues harmonica player, composer, and instructor
- David B. Barrett (1927–2011), professor and research secretary
- David D. Barrett (1892–1977), American soldier and diplomat
- David L. Barrett (1931–1999), American politician
- David M. Barrett (born c. 1951), American political science professor
- David V. Barrett, British sociologist of religion
- David E. Barrett, professor of mathematics
- David Michael Barrett (born 1971), screenwriter and film producer

== See also ==
- David Barratt, Scottish politician
