= John Barret =

John Barret may refer to:

- John Richard Barret (1825–1903), American politician
- John Barret (divine) (1631–1713), English Presbyterian cleric
- John Baret or Barret (died 1580), English lexicographer
- John Barret (theologian) (died 1563), English Carmelite friar

== See also ==
- John Barrett (disambiguation)
