= End Use Energy Demand Centres =

Energy research institute in the United Kingdom

The End Use Energy Demand (EUED) Centres carry out interdisciplinary research and advise policy on reducing energy demand to help achieve the UK government's CO_{2} emissions targets. The Centres are a £30m investment of the Research Councils UK Energy Programme (with additional funding from industrial partners) that run from 2013 to 2018. The six large centres are based across 25 institutions and encompass over 200 researchers.

== Background ==
The UK is committed to achieving large-scale reductions (80%) in greenhouse gas emissions by 2050 (Climate Change Act 1990). End Use Energy Demand (EUED) research is about reducing energy use on the scale needed to reach this target, whilst maintaining current or achieving better standards of living and economic growth. The EUED Centres were funded in 2013 following a 2011 call for proposals from the Research Councils UK Energy Programme to address these issues.

== The Centres ==
The Centres are:

- Centre for Energy Epidemiology (CEE) - Based at University College London and directed by Professor Tadj Oreszczyn.
- Centre for Sustainable Energy Use in Food Chains (CSEF) - Based at Brunel University and led by Professor Savvas Tassou.
- Dynamics of Energy, Mobility and Demand (DEMAND) - Based at the University of Lancaster and led by Professor Elizabeth Shove.
- Centre on Innovation and Energy Demand (CIED) - Based at the University of Sussex and directed by Professor Benjamin Sovacool.
- Centre for Industrial Energy, Materials and Products (CIE-MAP) - Based at the University of Leeds and directed by Professor John Barrett.
- Interdisciplinary Centre for Storage, Transformation and Upgrading of Thermal Energy (i-STUTE) - Based at the University of Warwick and directed by Professor Robert Critoph.

== See also ==
- Research Councils UK
- UK Energy Research Centre
- Department of Environment and Climate Change
