= Elizabeth Shove =

British sociologist (born 1959)

- Born: 7 November 1959 (age 67); Guildford, Surrey, England
- Education: Godalming Grammar School; University of York (BA, PhD)
- Occupation: Sociologist
- Parent(s): John Shove; Jocelyn Shove
- Scientific career
- Fields: Sociology

Elizabeth Shove (born 7 November 1959) is a British sociologist who has written about social practice theory, consumption, everyday life and energy demand. She is Director of the Centre on the Dynamics of Energy, Mobility and Demand (DEMAND) at Lancaster University. The DEMAND Centre is one of six End Use Energy Demand Centres.

== Early life ==
Shove was born on 7 November 1959 in Guildford, the daughter of John and Jocelyn Shove. She attended Godalming Grammar School and then York University, where she received a BA and then a PhD in 1986.

== Career ==
She was a research fellow at the Institute of Advanced Architectural Studies at York University from 1986 to 1992. She then became a senior lecturer at the University of Sunderland from 1992 to 1995. Shove joined Lancaster University in 1995 as the deputy director for the Centre for the Study of Environmental Change, until 1998 when she became director of the Centre for Science Studies. She has been part of the department of sociology at the university since 2000.

Shove's research on energy spans 25 years during which time she has held research awards from the Building Research Establishment, the European Union, the Engineering and Physical Sciences Research Council, the European Social Fund, the Economic and Social Research Council, the Department of Education, the Department of Transport, Transport for London and Unilever. She is author/co-author of 9 books, including Sustainable Practices (2013: Routledge), The Dynamics of Social Practice (2012: Sage), and Comfort, Cleanliness and Convenience (2003: Berg).

Additionally, throughout her career she has explored the relationship between sociological theories and design methods.

== Policy impact ==
On 15 September Shove gave evidence at the House of Lords to a Design Commission enquiry on design and behaviour in the built environment. She was invited in response to an official submission to the enquiry.

Shove is a regular contributor to The Conversation and a contributor to the World Economic Forum's Agenda and The Guardian.

== Selected publications ==
- Shove, E., Pantzar, M., Watson, M. (2012). The Dynamics of Social Practice, Sage: London.
- Shove, E. (2010). Beyond the ABC: climate change policy and theories of social change. Environment and planning A 42 (6), 1273–1285.
- Shove, E., Walker, G. (2007). CAUTION! Transitions ahead: politics, practice, and sustainable transition management. Environment and Planning A 39 (4), 763–770.
- Shove, E., Pantzar, M. (2005). Consumers, Producers and Practices Understanding the invention and reinvention of Nordic walking. Journal of consumer culture 5 (1), 43–64.
- Cass, N., Shove, E. & Urry, J. Social exclusion, mobility and access (2005). The sociological review 53 (3), 539-555http://onlinelibrary.wiley.com/doi/10.1111/j.1467-954X.2005.00565.x/abstract.
