= John Barrett (cricketer) =

English cricketer

Personal information
- Full name: John Barrett
- Born: 12 November 1946 (age 80); Norwich, Norfolk, England
- Batting: Left-handed
- Bowling: Right-arm off break

Domestic team information
- Years: Team
- 1970–1982: Norfolk

Career statistics
Competition	List A
Matches	1
Runs scored	1
Batting average	1.00
100s/50s	–/–
Top score	1
Balls bowled	–
Wickets	–
Bowling average	–
5 wickets in innings	–
10 wickets in match	–
Best bowling	–
Catches/stumpings	–/–
- Source: Cricinfo, 29 June 2011

John Barrett (born 12 November 1946) is a former English cricketer. Barrett was a left-handed batsman who bowled right-arm off break. He was born in Norwich, Norfolk.

Barrett made his debut for Norfolk in the 1970 Minor Counties Championship against Lincolnshire. Barrett played Minor counties cricket for Norfolk from 1970 to 1982, which included 40 Minor Counties Championship matches. He made his only List A appearance in 1985 against Leicestershire in the NatWest Trophy. In this match, he was dismissed for a single run by Gordon Parsons.
