= Otis Barrett =

American agriculturalist

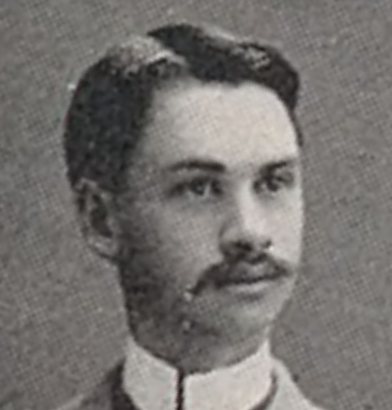
- Born: April 18, 1872; Clarendon, Vermont, US
- Died: October 6, 1950 (aged 78); Clarendon, Vermont, US
- Education: University of Vermont
- Scientific career
- Fields: Botany, entomology
- Workplaces: US Department of Agriculture, US War Department

Otis Warren Barrett (April 18, 1872 – October 6, 1950) was an American agriculturalist. He spent his early career collecting insects in Mexico, where he became a museum curator and agent for that country's exhibition at the 1900 Paris Exposition. In 1901 Barrett went to Puerto Rico as a US Department of Agriculture entomologist and botanist and afterwards worked with the department's Office of Seed and Plant Introduction. In 1908 he was appointed director of agriculture for the Portuguese colony of Mozambique.

Barrett returned to the Department of Agriculture in 1910 as chief of their experimental stations and horticultural divisions in the Philippines. He became a horticulturalist in the Panama Canal Zone in 1917 and served as the US War Department's agricultural adviser to Liberia in 1920–21. Barrett returned to Puerto Rico with the Department of Agriculture from 1923 to 1929 and afterwards was a horticulturalist at the University of Hawaii. In 1935 he collected a shipment of rotenone-producing plants from Dominica for use in pesticide production.

== Biography ==
Otis Warren Barrett was born in Clarendon, Vermont on April 18, 1872; his parents were James and Alice W. Kelley Barrett. He graduated from the University of Vermont in 1897, where he was a member of Kappa Sigma fraternity. He afterwards worked with the entomologist JA Pringle in Mexico, collecting insects until 1898. Barrett then worked for the West India Improvement Company, as a curator and entomologist at the Museum de la Comision Geographivo Exploradora and was a travelling agent for the Mexican exhibition at the 1900 Paris Exposition.

Between 1901 and 1905 Barrett was entomologist and botanist to the Puerto Rico Agricultural Experiment Station. In 1903 he was listed as an "agent and expert" in the US Department of Agriculture's Office of Experiment Stations on a salary of $1,500 per year and was working in Mayagüez, Puerto Rico. On July 8, 1905 he was appointed assistant in the Office of Seed and Plant Introduction on a salary of $1,800 per annum. It was stated that his services were urgently needed to assist the chief of that office in communicating with other countries regarding possible plant introductions. Barrett held this position until 1908 when he was appointed director of agriculture for the Portuguese colony of Mozambique. By the time his term ended in 1910 he had established a scientific agricultural program in that state.

Barrett was made chief of the Bureau of Agriculture's experimental stations and horticultural divisions in the Philippines in 1910 and held this position until 1914 when he was appointed a horticulturalist of the Panama Canal Zone, where he served until 1917. He was the United States War Department's agricultural adviser to Liberia from 1920 to 1921 and with the Department of Agriculture in Puerto Rico from 1923 to 1929. During this time he was responsible for introducing the Artocarpus integer fruiting tree to the territory. It was said to be similar, but superior to, the jackfruit. From 1929 until 1930 he was a horticulturalist at the University of Hawaii.

In his varied career Barrett also advised the agricultural society of Trinidad and Tobago on the diseases affecting Theobroma cacao and managed coconut plantations in Nicaragua. He was also a member of the Botany Society of Washington. In 1935 he was sent to Dominica to collect a quantity of rotenone-producing plants for the Department of Agriculture which might be used for pesticide production. En route he stopped at the Panama Canal Zone where he collected a number of Derris elliptica plants from the experimental gardens. He recommended that the Canal Zone horticulturalists expand the cultivation of such plants, though there was insufficient funding to enable this. Barrett died at his brother Percy's home in Clarendon on October 6, 1950.
