= Matthew Barrett =

Matthew Barrett may refer to:

- Matthew W. Barrett, (born 1944), Irish Canadian banker
- Matthew Barrett (journalist) (born 1992), British journalist
- Matt Barrett (born 1970), American politician of Ohio
- Matthew Barrett, Australian rapper, known as Matty B
- Matthew David Barrett (born 1974), Australian botanist
