= Frank Barrett (Irish republican) =

- Born: 1892
- Died: 13 April 1931 (aged 38–39)
- Allegiance: Irish Republican Army
- Service years: 1913–1923
- Conflicts: Irish War of Independence; Irish Civil War
- Other work: Chairman Clare County Council

Frank Barrett (c. 1892—13 April 1931)) was an Irish Republican Army (IRA) officer during the Irish War of Independence and a commander of the anti-Treaty IRA 1st Western Division during the Irish Civil War.
