= John W. Barrett (mathematician) =

British mathematician

- Occupation: Mathematician

John W. Barrett is a mathematician who was a professor at Imperial College, London until 2019. He held the position of Head of Numerical Analysis in the Department of Mathematics.

== Career ==
His academic work focused on numerical methods for solving partial differential equations and mathematical models involving complex physical phenomena. He contributed to research on finite element methods and their applications in computational mathematics, particularly in modeling and solving problems in fluid dynamics, phase separation, and materials science. Throughout his career, Professor Barrett published extensively in journals, addressing topics such as the numerical approximation of geometric evolution equations, Cahn-Hilliard systems, and surface diffusion models.
