= David E. Barrett =

American mathematician

David Eugene Barrett is a professor of mathematics at the University of Michigan.

Barrett received his Ph.D. from the University of Chicago in 1982 under the supervision of Raghavan Narasimhan.

In 2012, Barrett became a fellow of the American Mathematical Society.
