= Fred Barrett =

Fred Barrett may refer to:

- Fred Barrett (jockey) (1867–1895), English horse racing jockey
- Fred Barrett (rugby league) (1920–2004), English rugby league player and coach
- Fred Barrett (ice hockey) (born 1950), Canadian retired ice hockey defenceman
- Fred Barrett (footballer) (1893–1968), English footballer
- Frederick Barrett (1883–1931), survivor of the sinking of RMS Titanic
- Frederick Whitfield Barrett (1875–1949), polo player

== See also ==
- Fred Barratt (1894–1947), English cricketer
