= Richard Barrett =

Richard Barrett may refer to:

== People ==
- Richard Barrett (bishop) (died 1645), Irish bishop
- Richard Barrett (FRS) (fl. 1713), a Fellow of the Royal Society of London
- Riocard Bairéad (Richard Barrett) (1740–1819), poet and schoolmaster from County Mayo, Ireland
- Richard Barrett (abolitionist) (fl. 1840); see World Anti-Slavery Convention
- Richard Barrett (Irish republican) (1889–1922), executed during Irish Civil War
- Richie Barrett (1933–2006), American musician and record producer
- Richard Barrett (Medal of Honor) (1838–1898), American soldier and Indian Campaigns Medal of Honor recipient
- Richard Barrett (lawyer) (1943–2010), American lawyer and white nationalist
- Richard Barrett (author) (born 1945), British author
- Richard Barrett (counter-terrorism expert) (born 1949), coordinator of the United Nations 1267 Monitoring Team
- Richard Barrett (composer) (born 1959), Welsh composer
- Dicky Barrett (born 1964), American musician known as Dicky Barrett
- Richard Boyd Barrett (born 1967), Irish political activist and chair of the Irish Anti-War Movement
- Richard Barrett (fl. 1987), playwright; see Griffin Theatre Company

== Fictional characters ==
- Richard Barrett, a character in the 1960s British television series The Champions

== See also ==
- Richard Barrett House, on the National Register of Historic Places listings in Summit County, Utah
- Richard Barret (divine) (died 1599), English Catholic divine
- Richard Baret (died 1401), MP for Gloucester
- Richard Barratt (1928–2013), British police officer
- Ricky Barrett (born 1981), baseball player, full name William Domingos Barrett
- Dicky Barrett (trader) (1807–1847), New Zealand whaler and trader
