= James Barrett =

James, Jimmy or Jim Barrett may refer to:

== Sports ==
- Jim Barrett (rugby union), (1888–1971), New Zealand rugby union player
- Jimmy Barrett (baseball) (1875–1921), American Major League Baseball center fielder
- Jim Barrett Sr. (1907–1970), English footballer
- Jim Barrett Jr. (1930–2014), English footballer
- Jimmy Barrett (Gaelic footballer) (born 1949), Irish sportsperson
- James Barrett (athlete) (1879–1942), Irish track and field athlete

== Others ==
- James Barrett, member of the UK band Senser
- Jimmy Barrett, a character on the TV series Mad Men, portrayed by Patrick Fischler
- James Barrett (colonel) (1710–1779), American militia leader
- James Barrett (Civil War) (1827–1865), Union commander at the Battle of Picacho Pass
- James Barrett (Vermont judge) (1814–1900), American lawyer, politician and judge
- James Barrett (academic) (1862–1945), Australian ophthalmologist and academic administrator
- James H. Barrett, medieval archaeologist, professor at Norwegian University of Science and Technology
- James Lee Barrett (1929–1989), American producer, screenwriter and writer
- James Platt Barrett (1838–1916), British teacher of the deaf-and-dumb and lepidopterist
- James Barrett (United States Air Force officer) (1919–1994), abortion clinic escort murdered by Paul Jennings Hill
- James E. Barrett (1922–2011), United States federal judge
- Jim Barrett (winemaker) (1926–2013), American winemaker and owner of Chateau Montelena
- James Gresham Barrett (born 1961), American politician
