= Craig Barrett =

Craig Barrett may refer to:

- Craig Barrett (race walker) (born 1971), New Zealand racewalker
- Craig Barrett (chief executive) (born 1939), American business executive

== See also ==
- Craig Braham-Barrett (born 1988), English footballer
- Craig Barratt (born 1962), Australian technology executive
