= John Barrett (energy researcher) =

British academic

John Richard Barrett OBE is a British academic who is chair in Energy and Climate Policy at the University of Leeds. He is the Director of the Centre for Industrial Energy, Materials and Products (CIE-MAP) (one of six End Use Energy Demand Centres) and co-director of the UK Energy Research Centre.

== Policy and media work ==
Barrett was a lead advisor to Defra in relation to the development of Publicly Available Standard 2050 (PAS2050)1. of goods and services. Barrett was commissioned by Defra to lead on understanding the carbon footprint of trade.

Barrett was selected as a lead author for the Intergovernmental Panel on Climate Change (IPCC) 5th Assessment for Working Group III and has appeared regularly on BBC Radio 4 news and discussion programmes and written numerous policy reports on sustainable consumption policy issues for a wide range of audiences.

Barrett was appointed Officer of the Order of the British Empire (OBE) in the 2022 Birthday Honours for services to climate change assessment.
