= Jack Barrett =

Jack Barrett may refer to:

- Jack Barett (footballer (1874–1934), English footballer who played for Southampton
- Jack Barrett (footballer, born 2002), English footballer
- Jack Barrett (hurler) (1910–1979), Irish sportsman
- Jack Barrett (cricketer) (1866–1916), Australian cricketer
- Jack Barrett (politician), Irish politician
- Jack Barrett (rugby union) (born 2004), Australian rugby union player

== See also ==
- John Barrett (disambiguation)
