= Bob Barrett (American football) =

American football player (born 1935)

Profile
- Position: End

Personal information
- Born: November 18, 1935 (age 90); Cleveland, Ohio, U.S.

Career information
- College: Baldwin–Wallace

Career history
- Buffalo Bills (1960)
- Stats at Pro Football Reference

Robert Patrick Barrett (born November 18, 1935) is an American former professional football player who was an offensive end in the American Football League (AFL) for the Buffalo Bills in 1960. He played college football for Baldwin–Wallace Yellow Jackets.

== See also ==
- List of American Football League players
