= Neil Barrett =

Neil Barrett may refer to:

- Neil Barrett (footballer) (born 1981), English footballer
- Neil Barrett (fashion designer) (born 1965), English fashion designer
- Neal Barrett Jr. (1929–2014), American writer
- Neil R. Barrett (born 1992), Irish rugby union player
- Deckscar (Neil Barrett, born 1986), DJ and music producer
