= Richard Barrett (author) =

British author (born 1945)

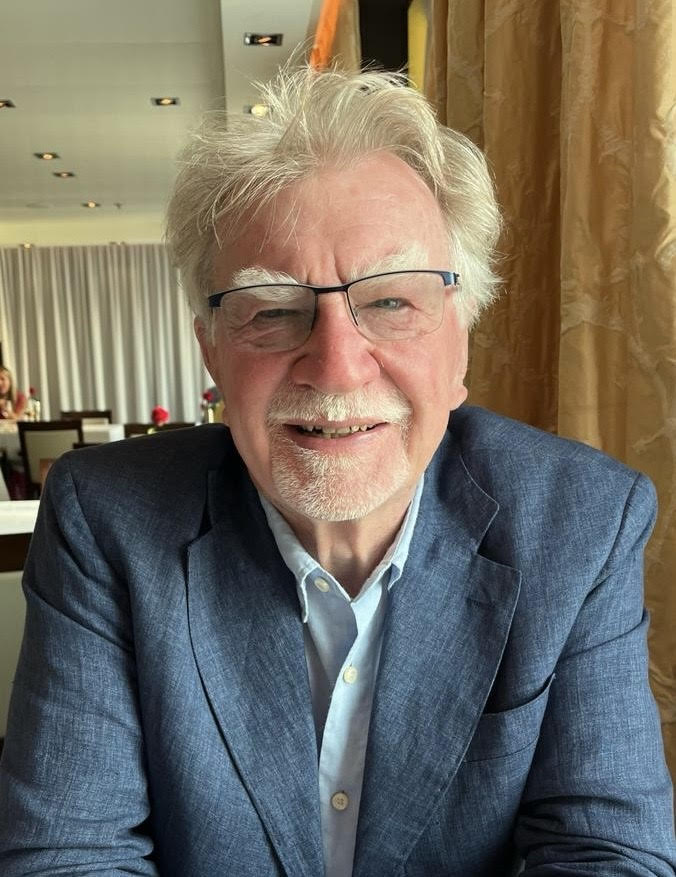
- Barrett in 2023
- Born: 7 March 1945 (age 81); Hull, United Kingdom
- Education: Manchester University; Newcastle University
- Occupations: Author, coach, consultant, philosopher
- Writing career
- Genres: Cultural transformation and personality growth
- Website: richardbarrettauthor.com

Richard Barrett (born 7 March 1945) is a British author, coach, and artist who writes about ego-soul dynamics, leadership, leadership development, values, consciousness, and cultural evolution in business and society. He founded the Barrett Values Centre in 1997 and is currently the managing director of the Barrett Academy for the Advancement of Human Values, which he founded in 2018.

== Early life and education ==
Barrett was born on 7 March 1945, in Kingston upon Hull, United Kingdom. In 1966, he graduated from Manchester University with a First Class Honors degree in Civil Engineering. He received a postgraduate engineering degree in highway and transportation engineering from Newcastle University.

== Career ==
Barrett was initially trained at the University of Manchester as a civil engineer and subsequently at the University of Newcastle as a transport engineer. After spending two years working for the City of Leicester (1969-1971) he joined Freeman Fox & Partners in London and set up their Paris office in 1973 where he worked until 1977.

He set up his own consulting practice in 1977 and consulted for the World Bank from 1979 to 1985, officially joining the Bank as a staff member in 1986. In 1992, he became the Assistant to the Vice President for Environmentally Sustainable Development and started the World Bank Spiritual Unfoldment Society. From 1995 to 1997, he investigated the World Bank's organisational values.

Throughout this period (from 1967 to 1997), Barrett spent most of his spare time studying psychology, spirituality, physics, and personal transformation. He left the World Bank in 1997 to create the international management consulting firm of Richard Barrett & Associates (which became the Barrett Values Centre in 2007).

The purpose of this organisation was to "provide consultants, change agents, and human resource professionals with tools and techniques for assessing the values of their organisations and implementing cultural transformation."

In 2018, Barrett founded the Barrett Academy for the Advancement of Human Values, an educational and research platform established to consolidate and extend his work on values, leadership, and organisational culture. The Academy focuses on the study of consciousness, human development, and values-based leadership, and provides learning and inquiry spaces that examine the relationship between individual development, ethical leadership, and systemic transformation across organisations and societies.

== Works overview ==
In 1995, Barrett published A Guide to Liberating Your Soul. In 1998, he published Liberating the Corporate Soul: Building a Visionary Organisation, in which he described the Seven Levels of Consciousness model and the values mapping instruments known as the Cultural Transformation Tools. He also introduced the concept of the Seven Levels of Leadership Consciousness.

From 2005 to 2007, he spearheaded an inquiry into Whole System Change in organisations.The results of this inquiry are presented in Building a Values-driven Organisation: A Whole System Approach to Cultural Transformation, published in 2006. In this book, he shows how the cultural transformation tools based on the seven levels of consciousness model have been used to transform the cultures of organisations in Australia, South Africa, Canada, and the USA. He also introduced the concepts of cultural and personal entropy, showing how they could be measured.

Barrett wrote, "... organisational transformation begins with the personal transformation of the leaders. Organisations don't transform; people do." "Making money and making a difference are mutually supportive goals. When companies care about their employees, the local community and society, their employees, the local community and society care about them. In other words, the quality of the energy you put into the world is the energy you get back."

From 2006 to 2024, Barrett wrote fourteen books. In The New Leadership Paradigm, published in 2011, he developed a program for leading the self, leading a team, leading an organisation, and leading society. Other concepts introduced in this book include the Seven Levels of Motivation, The Seven Levels of Identity, the Seven Levels of Happiness, and the Six Modes of Decision-Making.

In Love, Fear and the Destiny of Nations, published in 2010, he discussed the impact of the evolution of worldviews on world affairs. In What My Soul Told Me, published in 2011, he described the five steps to soul activation. In Evolutionary Coaching, published in 2014, he introduced a coaching process based on the Seven Stages of Psychological Development. In A New Psychology of Human Well-Being, published in 2015, he introduced the concept of ego-soul dynamics as an approach to mental health. In The Values-Driven Organization, published in 2017, he showed how cultural health and employee well-being were the pathways to sustainable performance.

In The Evolutionary Human, published in 2018, he introduced the concept of evolutionary intelligence and the three universal stages of evolution. In Everything I Have Learned About Values, also published in 2018, he provided a detailed overview of the importance of values in decision-making. In Worldview Dynamics and the Consciousness of Nations, published in 2019, he showed examples of how the seven levels of consciousness model could be used to map the values of nations. In many of these nations, the results of the values assessments have been used to begin nationwide dialogues on values. In Latvia and Iceland, the results of the values assessments have been instrumental in helping to form public policies. In Soul-Centred Living, published in 2014, a year before his 80th birthday, he presented a deeply personal exploration of the journey to living a soul-centred life.

In 2025, Barrett’s work entered a new phase characterised by an increased focus on consciousness, embodiment, and the inner dimensions of leadership and human development. Building on earlier frameworks centred on values, culture, and systems change, his writing and teaching during this period explored the relationship between psychological development, nervous system regulation, moral authority, and states of awareness. This phase involved a consolidation of his previous work into integrative models addressing leadership under pressure, worldview dynamics, and transitions from ego-centred approaches toward more service-oriented modes of functioning.His work during this time placed emphasis on lived experience, presence, and coherence in discussions of ethical leadership and societal change, reflecting a shift in focus from organisational assessment tools toward the study of internal aspects of consciousness.

== Published works ==
- The Universal Model of Human Consciousness: How Awareness Shapes the Universe (2025);ISBN 978-1-291-95299-5
- Nothing: How Nothing Reveals Everything (2025); ISBN 978-1-257-86252-8
- The New Human Frequency: The Foundational Guide to Conscious Evolution (2025); ISBN 978-1-300-12130-5
- The New Human and the Cosmic Self: Living as Frequency in a Conscious Universe (2025); ISBN 978-1-300-19002-8
- Lifting the Veil to the One Mind (2025)
- The One Mind: A Companion for the Seeker — Consciousness, Energy, and the Science of Remembrance (2025); ISBN 978-1-326-07512-5
- A Year of Remembering (2025); ISBN 978-1-326-49266-3
- A Year of Becoming (2025); ISBN 978-1-300-23900-0
- A Year of Embodiment (2025); ISBN 978-1-300-26100-1
- A Year of Offering (2025); ISBN 978-1-300-26085-1 (paperback); ISBN 978-1-300-23875-1
- Transmissions from the Edge of Time (2025); ISBN 978-1-300-25323-5
- Transmissions for the Children of Light (2025); ISBN 978-1-300-21415-1
- Transmissions from the Temple of Silence (2025)
- Transmissions for Earth Keepers (2025)
- Transmissions from the Void (2025)
- The Cosmic Handbook (2025)
- Feeling Your Way to Enlightenment: A Soul-Centred Psychology (2024/2025); ISBN 978-1-300-22089-3; ISBN 1-300-22089-9
- The New Human: Activating the Inner Architecture for Conscious Evolution (2024/2025); ISBN 978-1-326-47946-6; ISBN 1-326-47946-6
- Healing the Body • Healing the Soul: The Developmental Roots of Illness and the Return to Wholeness (2025); ISBN 978-1-300-19008-0; ISBN 1-300-19008-6
- The Alchemy of Loneliness: Finding Soul in Every Stage of Life (2025); ISBN 978-1-300-15077-0; ISBN 1-300-15077-7
- Sacred Union: The Hidden Architecture of Human Love (2025); ISBN 978-1-300-15080-0; ISBN 1-300-15080-7
- Ego-Soul Dynamics: The Architecture of Inner Alignment (2025)
- The Big Three Questions: A Journey of Self-Recognition in a Conscious Universe (2025); ISBN 978-1-326-01094-2;
- The One Mind Trilogy (2025)
- The Council of Twelve. The One Mind Trilogy, Vol. I (2025); ISBN 978-1-257-82546-2
- The Thirteenth Thread. The One Mind Trilogy, Vol. II (2025); ISBN 978-1-257-64912-9
- The New Dawn. The One Mind Trilogy, Vol. III (2025); ISBN 978-1-326-08721-0
- The New Leader: Leadership Through Frequency (2025)
- The New Master Coach (2025)
- The New Organisation (2025)
- The New Entrepreneur (2025)
- The New Investor (2025)
- The Silent Soul of the North: Liberating the Hidden Heart of Scandinavia (2025)
- Soul-Centred Living: From Survival to Service (2024)
- Worldview Dynamics and the Well-Being of Nations (2020); ISBN 978-1684716005
- The Evolutionary Human: How Darwin Got It Wrong – It Was Never About Species, It Was Always About Consciousness (2018); ISBN 978-1-483-49446-3
- Everything I Have Learned About Values (2018); ISBN 978-1483479415
- The Values-Driven Organization: Cultural Health and Employee Well-Being as a Pathway to Sustainable Performance (2017); ISBN 978-1138679153
- A New Psychology of Human Well-Being: An Exploration of the Influence of Ego-Soul Dynamics on Mental and Physical Health (2016); ISBN 978-1326591458
- The Metrics of Human Consciousness (2015); ISBN 978-1291987966
- Evolutionary Coaching: A Values-Based Approach to Unleashing Human Potential (2014); ISBN 978-1483411781
- The Values-Driven Organization: Unleashing Human Potential for Performance and Profit (2013); ISBN 978-0415815024
- What My Soul Told Me: A Practical Guide Soul Activation (2012); ISBN 978-1471770166
- Love, Fear and the Destiny of Nations: The Impact of the Evolution of Human Consciousness on World Affairs (2012)
- The New Leadership Paradigm: Leading in Society Journal & Workbook (2011); ISBN 978-1445716725
- The New Leadership Paradigm: Leading an organisation Journal & Workbook (2011); ISBN 978-1445716725
- The New Leadership Paradigm: Leading a Team Journal & Workbook (2011); ISBN 978-1445716725
- The New Leadership Paradigm (9 January 2010);ISBN 978-1445716725
- Building a Values Driven Organization: A Whole System Approach to Cultural Transformation Butterworth-Heinemann; 1 edition (2006)ISBN 978-0750679749
- Building a Values-Driven Organization: A Whole System Approach to Cultural Transformation (2006)
- Liberating the Corporate Soul: Building a Visionary Organization Butterworth-Heinemann; 1 edition (5 November 1998)
- A Guide to Liberating Your Soul Fulfilling Books (1995);ISBN 978-0964322639
