= Sean Barrett =

Sean Barrett or Seán Barrett may refer to:

- Seán Barrett (actor) (born 1940), British actor whose credits include Z-Cars
- Sean Barrett (economist) (born 1944), Irish transport economist and Senator
- Seán Barrett (politician) (1944–2026), Irish politician, Fine Gael TD and minister
- Sean Barrett (writer) (born 1959), American writer, nucleonicist, member of the Wikipedia Arbitration Committee
