= Frank Barrett (writer) =

British newspaper editor

Frank Barrett (born 9 October 1953 in Panteg, Monmouthshire, Wales) is a travel writer, editor and author. He worked for The Mail on Sunday in London from May 1994 until September 2018.

== Background ==
Born in Pontypool, his father was a policeman and he spent most of his childhood living in the Police Station, Tintern in the Wye Valley. He was educated at Monmouth School and the Polytechnic of North London.

He is married with two children.

== Career ==
After graduation Barrett worked as a trainee at Travel Trade Gazette for three years. After two years at Business Traveller magazine and three years freelancing for the Sunday Times Magazine, Daily Telegraph and other publications he was the first Travel Editor of The Independent newspaper when it was launched in 1986.

He became Travel Editor of The Mail on Sunday in 1994, and Simon Calder took over for him at the Independent. He won the 1989 British Press Travel Writer of the Year award and was nominated on a further three occasions.

His work includes writing about Long Island, New York His descriptions of Amityville drew objections.

== Bibliography ==
Book	Publisher	Year
Countdown: The Great Guide to London and Heritage Cities	Countdown PLC	1999
Where Was Wonderland?: Traveller's Guide to the Settings of Classic Children's Books	Hamlyn young books	1997
The Mountain Biker's Guide to the Lake District	Hutchinson	1991
Family Spain: How to Choose the Right Holiday	Boxtree Ltd	1994
Family USA	Boxtree Ltd	1994
Family Italy: How to Choose the Right Holiday	Boxtree Ltd	1994
Family France	Boxtree Ltd	1993
"Independent" Good Holiday Guide 1993	Headline Book Publishing	1993
The Mountain Biker's Guide to the Ridgeway	Hutchinson	1991
"Independent" Guide to Real Holidays Abroad		1990
Consumer's Guide to Air Fares (A Family money-go-round special)		1986
Spain's Hidden Country: A Traveller's Guide to Northern Spain	Telegraph Publications in association with Brittany Ferries	1986
