= Nathan Barrett =

Nathan Barrett may refer to:

- Nathan Barrett (ice hockey) (born 1981), Canadian ice hockey centre
- Nathan Barrett (politician) (born 1976), Australian politician
- Nathan Franklin Barrett (1845–1919), American landscape architect
