= Thomas Baret =

Thomas Baret (died 1396), was an English Member of Parliament (MP) and spicer.

He was a Member of the Parliament of England for Oxford in September 1388.
