= Pontruet =

- Commune
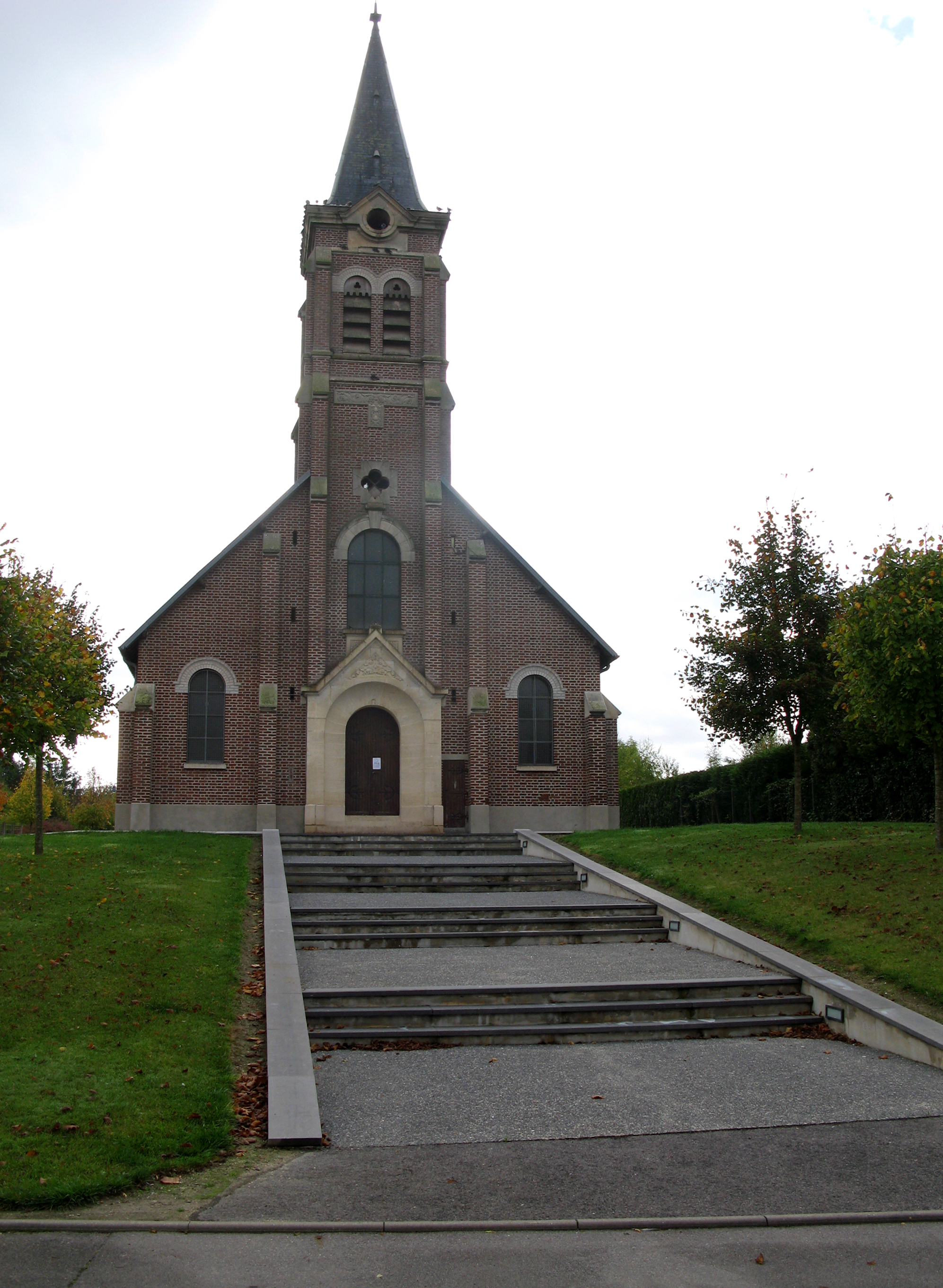
- The church of Pontruet
- Location of Pontruet
- Location within France Location within Hauts-de-France
- Coordinates: 49°54′37″N 3°13′54″E
- Country: France
- Region: Hauts-de-France
- Department: Aisne
- Arrondissement: Saint-Quentin
- Canton: Saint-Quentin-1
- Intercommunality: Pays du Vermandois

Government
  - Mayor (2026–32): Jean-Pierre Merlin
- Area^{1}: 6.75 km^{2} (2.61 sq mi)
- Elevation: 72 m (236 ft)
- Highest elevation: 143 m (469 ft)
- Lowest elevation: 72 m (236 ft)
- Population (2023): 353
  - Density: 52.3/km^{2} (135/sq mi)
- Time zone: UTC+01:00 (CET)
  - Summer (DST): UTC+02:00 (CEST)
- INSEE/Postal code: 02615 /02490
- ^{1} French Land Register data, which excludes lakes, ponds, glaciers > 1 km^{2} (0.386 sq mi or 247 acres) and river estuaries.

Pontruet is a commune in the Aisne department in Hauts-de-France in northern France.

== Population ==
Historical population
Year	Pop.	±% p.a.
1968	157	—
1975	210	+4.24%
1982	274	+3.87%
1990	287	+0.58%
1999	324	+1.36%
2007	335	+0.42%
2012	328	−0.42%
2017	344	+0.96%
2023	353	+0.43%
Source: INSEE

== See also ==
- Communes of the Aisne department
