= Thomas Barritt =

British antiquary (1743–1820)

- Born: 1743; Manchester
- Died: 1820 (aged 76–77)

Thomas Barritt (1743–1820) was an early British antiquary.

== Life ==
Barritt was born at Withy Grove, Manchester in 1743, and came of Derbyshire yeoman stock, his forefathers having settled at Bolton and Worsley, but his father, John Barritt, was the first of the family resident in Manchester. Nothing is known of Barritt's education, but he developed a strong taste for archæological research which did not interfere with his success as a businessman. He lost a leg at an early age, and afterwards used an artificial one made of cork.

He kept a saddle-maker's shop in Hanging Ditch, and gathered a collection of manuscripts and miscellaneous objects of antiquity. He travelled about the district and made sketches and memoranda which were of great use to subsequent writers.

He was one of the early members of the Manchester Literary and Philosophical Society, and contributed several papers to its Memoirs.

He died 29 October 1820, aged 77, and was buried in the Manchester parish church. Barritt's claim to remembrance is that with great patience and skill he recorded many facts in the history of the district which would otherwise have been lost. He had a special interest in heraldry, and blazoning coats of arms.

== Works ==
Among his contributions to the Manchester Literary and Philosophical Society Memoirs are essays on supposed Druidical remains near Halifax, on antiquities found in the river Ribble, and on a Roman inscription found in Campfield. A number of his manuscripts were secured for Chetham's Library, Manchester, and at the end of the 19th century, several others were in private hands. He wrote verses also, and several of them have been printed, but they are little better than doggerel rhyme.

His correspondence with the leading antiquaries of the time, including Thomas Dunham Whitaker, Lord Stanley, Joseph Hunter and Sir John Prestwich appears to have been extensive. One of the most interesting objects in his collection was a sword which he believed to have been that of Edward the Black Prince. John Parsons Earwaker wrote a monograph on the swords attributed to the Prince, which discussed the claims of Barritt and others. Two portraits of Barritt were engraved, in which he is represented with the famous sword and some other objects of his museum.
