= John Barrett (Missouri politician) =

American politician (1915–2000)

John P. Barrett (November 17, 1915 – March 27, 2000) was an American Democratic politician who served in the Missouri General Assembly. He served in the Missouri Senate between 1955 and 1967.

Born in St. Louis, Missouri, he was educated in the public schools of St. Louis. On August 29, 1934, Barrett married Dolores Mabel Miller in St. Louis, Missouri. He served in the United States Navy, in the South Pacific, during World War II.
