= Slim Barrett =

British jewelry designer

Slim Barrett is an Irish artist.

Barrett moved to London from Athenry in 1983 having studied Fine Art in Galway, and has since produced works of contemporary design, with works commissioned by Chanel, Ungaro, Versace, Montana, Lagerfeld, and Galliano.

Among his other work is his design for the diamond coronet for Victoria Adams' marriage to David Beckham in 1999.

Awards include the Martini Rossi Excellence in Design Award, 1987, and De Beers Diamond's International Award.

Barrett's work is in the Victoria and Albert Museum, London and the Ulster Museum, Belfast. His work has been exhibited worldwide including the Tokyo National Museum of Modern Art and the Pompidou Centre, Paris. A diamond tiara designed by Barrett entered the Guinness Book of Records 2000.
