= Thomas Barrett (bishop) =

Irish bishop

Styles of Thomas Barrett
- Reference style: The Right Reverend
- Spoken style: My Lord
- Religious style: Bishop

Thomas Barrett (Irish: Tomás Bairéad; died c. 1485) was a fifteenth-century Bishop of Annaghdown.

Barrett obtained a papal provision to the see of Annaghdown on 17 April 1458 and acted as a suffragan bishop in the English dioceses of Exeter (1458; 1468–75) and Bath and Wells (1482–85).

According to Cotton, Barrett was also a canon of York Minster; holding the Prebendary of Laughton (1466–67).

Barrett died sometime after 1485.
