= Tomás Bairéad =

Irish writer and nationalist

Tomás Bairéad (1893–1973) was an Irish author and nationalist. Born in Galway, his father was called Michael Barrett and his mother Mary McDonough. He had two sisters and one brother. He was a member of the Moycullen group of the Irish Volunteers in 1916 and soon after became an IRA volunteer. He was also a member of the Irish Republican Brotherhood (IRB) and Sinn Féin. He was part of a group of Volunteers who were involved in the burning of the RIC Barracks in Rosmuc in 1920. He began his journalistic career with the Galway Express, a weekly republican paper. In 1922 he joined the Irish Independent, writing on politics, and would later become the newspaper's editor in 1945. While working for the Independent he was presented the Irish Academy of Letters Award (1938). Bairéad also invented his own Irish shorthand. His close friend, Máirtín Ó Cadhain, urged him to leave the IRA to focus on his writings.

== Early life ==
Thomas Barrett (1893–1973), An Bairéadach, or Tomás Bairéad, as he was also known, was a journalist and Irish language author. He was born on 7 July 1893 in Ballydotia, Moycullen, County Galway. He married Ellen Maher (1903–1947) from Clonard, county Westmeath in Corpus Christi Church, St Martin's (Maiden Lane), London on 25 June 1930. Ellen's father, James was also a farmer. They had two daughters, Treasa, a nurse, and Maura, a librarian.

He was a fine athlete and sportsman, and as a young man played Gaelic football and hurling with his native parish team. When he was barely 17 years of age, Bairéad was involved in cattle rustling. The cattle, in the ownership of the landlord George Burke, were driven from Burke's land at Cnoc a' tSean Bhaile. Bairéad's involvement in this activity was in reaction to the eviction of a number of his neighbours by the landlord, and resulted in him spending some time in gaol. Bairéad was primarily self-educated.

== Personal life and career ==
Bairéad was a member of the Moycullen group of the Irish Volunteers (Óglaigh na h-Éireann) in 1916. He was a member of the IRB and Sinn Féin, and administered the IRB oath to new members. He was friendly with Liam Mellows and Proinsias Ó hEidhin, and others who were leaders of the 1916 Rebellion in county Galway. He was one of a group of Volunteers involved in the burning of the RIC Barracks in Rosmuc in 1920. For these and other republican activities, he spent some time in Galway Gaol.

Bairéad commenced his journalistic career with the Galway Express, a weekly republican paper, in 1917. When paper's printing press was destroyed by the RIC, and Black and Tans in 1920, he transferred to the Connacht Tribune. During this period he had an address at 5 Nuns' Island, Galway.

He was appointed to the staff of the Irish Independent on 18 September 1922. In 1945 he became responsible for the Irish language page. In 1930 he purchased the family home, 3 Beechmount Villas, Glasnevin, Dublin, where he lived until he retired to Moycullen in 1948. While with the Independent he travelled to and reported on various Celtic Congresses held in Wales, Scotland and the Isle of Man, and in 1943 he reported on Éamon de Valera's general election campaign.

He wrote extensively during the 1930s and 1940s. His first collection of short stories, Cumhacht na Cinneamhna, was published by An Gúm in 1936. The collection received very positive reviews, with the Connacht Tribune writing, 'In originality, technique and language, those stories probably surpass anything of their kind published in Irish', and 'It will not be surprising if a few of those stories find their way among the classics', while the Irish Times wrote, "While the language is rich, idiomatic and adequate, the stories themselves could well be the authentic work of a novelist in any language'. Bairéad was awarded the O'Growney Award by the Irish Academy of Letters for this collection in 1937.

His next collection An Geall a Briseadh followed shortly afterwards, again published by An Gúm. This was a collection of short stories and sketches dealing mainly with scenes and events familiar to Bairéad in his native countryside. This book also received positive reviews, such as one writing that Bairéad "is undoubtedly a discovery and a decided addition to the ranks of Gaelic writers". For this collection he was awarded the Douglas Hyde Literary Fund('Ciste an Chraoibhin Aoibhin'), in 1938 for the best original work in the Irish language. The book was placed on the syllabus for the Matriculation (University entrance examination) in 1940, and later the Department of Education included it on the school syllabus for 1953–1954.

His next accomplishment Cruithneacht agus Ceannabháin, a collection of 13 short stories, was published by Talbot Press in 1940. In 1949, Ór na hAithinne was published.

His last great work, Gan Baisteadh, which is semi-autobiographical, contained 33 chapters each telling a different story. This was published by Sáirseal agus Dill in 1969.

In 1973 As an nGéibheann was published. This was a collection of the correspondence between Tomás and Máirtín Ó Cadhain, during Máirtín's time in prison.

Bairéad also received awards for other short stories, such as Second Prize in Class 4, Irish, Short Story for his entry 'Ruaidhri Ruadh, an Stiléara', in the Tailteann Literary Competitions in 1931, and an Oireachtas Certificate for first prize for the short story, 'Duais an Mhaolánaigh' in 1951. Bairéad's daughter, Treasa (the donor of the collection) also has in her possession a medal inscribed as follows, 'Aonach Tailteann 1932 (an Bhainnriogain Tailte).

== Involvement in 1916 Easter Rising ==
Tomás Bairéad's main involvement in the 1916 Easter Rising was through the form of newspapers. His newspaper clippings include details of events in the Moycullen area during the Easter week of 1916, and also includes references to the 1919 local election. As well as those it also includes a transcript of the Irish Republican Brotherhood's oath. The collection is full with names associated with Irish republicanism and Irish politics, such as Liam Mellows, Seán McDermot, Éamon de Valera, and Jack Lynch. The letters from Bairéad's friend Morchadh Ó Dabhorionn, are fascinating as they reveal something resembling that of the loneliness of an Irish emigrant. The quote states "…nearer to me than Éireann go Brách with all its faults and shortcoming, it is to me the greatest and is closest to my heart. It was too bad that fate made me leave there for as you have said more than once before it was there that I did belong"

== Bibliography ==
- Cumhacht na Cinneamhna, 1936, An Gúm
- An Geall a Briseadh, 1937, An Gúm / Oifig Diolta Foillseachtain Rialtais/ Publications Branch of the Department of Education
- Cruithneacht agus Ceannabháin, 1940, Talbot Press, Dublin
- Ór na hAithinne, 1949, Dublin
- Gan Baisteadh, 1972, Sáirseal agus Dill
- Dán, 1972/73, Sáirséal agus Dill
- As an nGéibheann, 1973

== Death ==
Tomás Bairéad died in Bon Secours Hospital, Galway, on 26 October 1973. His death was the result of a short illness. Newspaper obituaries for Bairéad referred to him as a "Noted Irish Scholar," and reported that his funeral was said in Irish. He is referred to as "an duine de na scríbhneoirí ba clúití a tháinig chugainn as Gaeltacht na Gaillimhe san aois seo" (Connacht Tribune), which can be translated to "He was one of the most famous writers to have come to us from the Gaeltacht in Galway."

In 1973, the year of Bairéad's death, his work 'As an nGéibheann' was also published. This was a collection of the correspondence between Tomás and Máirtín Ó Cadhain, during Máirtín's time in prison.

== See also ==
- Jack Lynch
- Máirtín Ó Cadhain
- Éamon de Valera
