= Gary Grossman =

American ecologist and poet

- Education: University of California, Berkley; University of California Davis
- Scientific career
- Fields: Community ecology
- Workplaces: Warnell School of Forestry and Natural Resources

Gary Grossman is an American ecologist, fisheries scientist and poet. He is a professor emeritus of Animal Ecology in the University of Georgia’s Warnell School of Forestry and Natural Resources. His work and research studies on stream fish assemblages, habitat selection, density dependence, and population regulation. He was also elected a Fellow of the American Fisheries Societyand a Fellow of the Linnean Society of London.

== Education ==
Grossman earned a Bachelor of Science in Conservation and Resource Studies from University of California, Berkeley in 1975. He later completed a PhD in Animal Ecology and Limnology at University of California, Davis in 1979.

== Career ==
Grossman joined the Warnell School of Forestry and Natural Resources at the University of Georgia in 1981 as a faculty member. He later served as Professor of Animal Ecology, Distinguished Research Professor from 2004 to 2009, Professor (2009 onward), and subsequently Professor Emeritus beginning in 2022

He served on editorial boards for scientific journals including Freshwater biology, Ecology of Freshwater Fish, Transactions of the American Fisheries Sociegy, Ichthyology and Herpetology, and Animal Biodiversity and Conservation, and chaired the Publications Oversight Committee of the American Fisheries Society. His poetry, short fiction, essays, and creative nonfiction have been published in Verse-Virtual, Sheila-Na-Gig, MacQueen's Quinterly, Salvation South, Delta Poetry Review, and Tamarind Literary Magazine. His work received nominations for the Pushcart Prize and The Best Small Fictions anthology in 2023.

== Research and scholarly works ==
Grossman’s early research focuses on community ecology and population ecology by challenging the long-standing assumption that species interactions, particularly competition, were the dominant force structuring ecological communities. Through long-term studies of North American and European stream fish assemblages, he demonstrated that stochastic environmental variation especially floods, droughts, and hydrologic instability could have stronger effects on community structure and resource use than interspecific competition.

He later shifted his focus toward the regulation of fish populations, particularly trout and salmon populations of both conservation and economic importance. Using multiple-hypothesis testing and information-theoretic approaches such as Akaike’s Information Criterion (AIC), he showed that density-dependent intraspecific competition often played a stronger role in regulating populations than environmental variation alone.

Grossman also developed a series of fitness-based habitat selection models for both benthic and water-column fishes. These models showed that individuals often occupy stream positions that maximize net energy intake, helping explain habitat use patterns and microhabitat selection in freshwater systems. His work linked behavioral ecology, energetics, and fisheries conservation in ways that shaped subsequent research on optimal foraging and stream habitat management.

=== Creative writing ===
He is the author of several poetry collections, including Lyrical Years, What I Meant to Say Was…, and Objects in Mirror May Be Closer Than They Appear. In 2022, he published his graphic memoir, My Life in Fish—One Scientist’s Journey.

== Awards and honors ==
In 2014, he received the Carl R. Sullivan Fishery Conservation Award ("Sully Award") from the American Fisheries Society.

In 2021, he received the Teaching Award in Ichthyology from the American Society of Ichthyologists and Herpetologists. He was elected a Fellow of the American Fisheries Society in 2015 and a Fellow of the Linnean Society of London in 2018. His poem Apostrophe was nominated for the Pushcart Prize, while his short story Mindfulness was nominated for The Best Small Fictions anthology by MacQueen's Quinterly in 2023.
