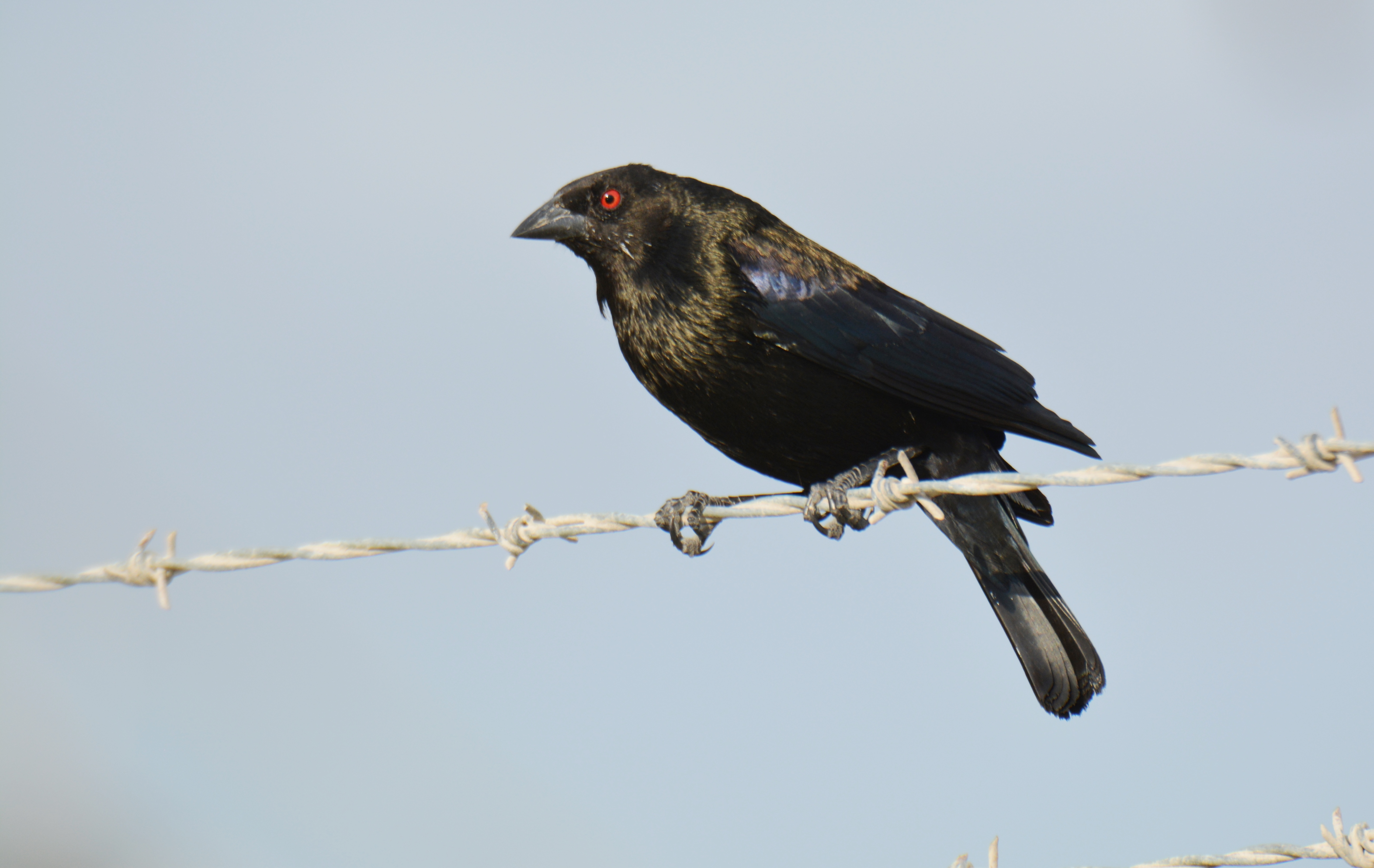

Conservation status
- Least Concern (IUCN 3.1)

Scientific classification
- Kingdom: Animalia
- Phylum: Chordata
- Class: Aves
- Order: Passeriformes
- Family: Icteridae
- Genus: Molothrus
- Species: M. aeneus

Binomial name
- Molothrus aeneus (Wagler, 1829)
- Range of M. aeneus Breeding range Year round range

= Bronzed cowbird =

Species of bird in the Americas

The bronzed cowbird (Molothrus aeneus), also known as the red-eyed cowbird, is a small icterid native to North America.

== Taxonomy ==
There are three subspecies:

- M. a. loyei Parkes & Blake, 1965 is found in the southwestern United States and northwestern Mexico.
- M. a. assimilis (Nelson, 1900) is found in southwestern Mexico.
- M. a. aeneus (Wagler, 1829), the nominate subspecies, is found in South Texas and from eastern Mexico to central Panama

The bronze-brown cowbird, which is restricted to the Caribbean coast of Colombia, was formerly considered to be an isolated population of this species.

== Distribution and habitat ==
They breed from the U.S. states of California, Arizona, New Mexico, Texas, and Louisiana south through Central America to Panama. They tend to be found in farmland, brush, and feedlots. Outside the breeding season, they are found in very open habitats, and roost in thick woods. These birds forage in open areas, often near cattle in pastures. Their diet mostly consists of seeds and insects, along with snails during breeding season for a calcium source.

== Description ==
The male bronzed cowbird is 20 cm (7.9 in) long and weighs 68 g (2.4 oz), with green-bronze, gloss-black plumage. His eyes are red in breeding season and brown otherwise. The female is 18.5 cm (7.3 in) long and weighs 56 g (2.0 oz). She is a dull black with a brown underbelly, and has brown eyes. Young birds have coloring similar to the females, with the exception of grey feather fringes.

== Ecology ==
Like all cowbirds, this bird is an obligate brood parasite; it lays its eggs in the nests of other birds. The young cowbird is fed by the host parents at the expense of their own young. Hosts include Prevost's ground-sparrows and white-naped brush finches. They develop rapidly, leaving the nest after 10–12 days.

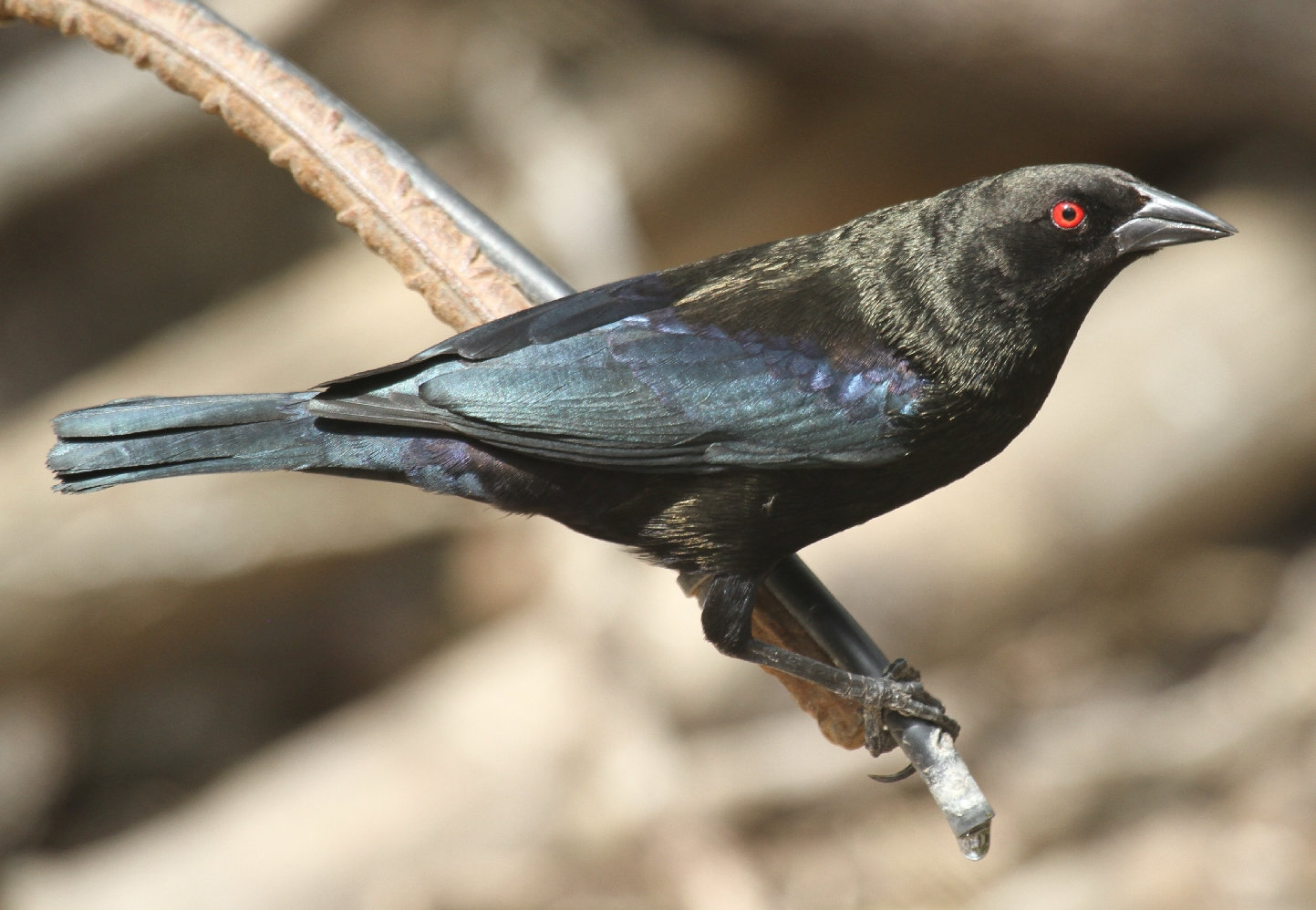
In the Laguna Atascosa National Wildlife Refuge in Texas
