= Molothrus resinosus =

Molothrus resinosus Temporal range: Late Pleistocene

Scientific classification
- Domain: Eukaryota
- Kingdom: Animalia
- Phylum: Chordata
- Class: Aves
- Order: Passeriformes
- Family: Icteridae
- Genus: Molothrus
- Species: †M. resinosus

Binomial name
- †Molothrus resinosus Steadman & Oswald, 2020

Extinct species of bird

Molothrus resinosus is an extinct species of bird in the family Icteridae. Its fossils are from the late Pleistocene Talara Tar Seeps of northwestern Peru.

The species name resinosus is derived from Latin and means "full of resin", referring to the tar seeps where it was discovered.

Molothrus resinosus was a medium-large-sized species of cowbird, much smaller than the giant cowbird but substantially larger than the shiny cowbird. Some extant icterids live alongside large grazing mammals, foraging near them; likewise, the Talara cowbird may have been closely associated with Pleistocene megafauna, and the demise of the latter may have led to the bird's extinction.
