= Gentes =

Gentes may refer to:

- Gens (pl. Gentes), in Ancient Rome, a family of those sharing the same nomen and a common ancestor
- Gens (behaviour) (pl. Gentes), in animal behavior, a host-specific lineage of a brood parasite species
- Ad gentes, a decree by the Second Vatican Council
