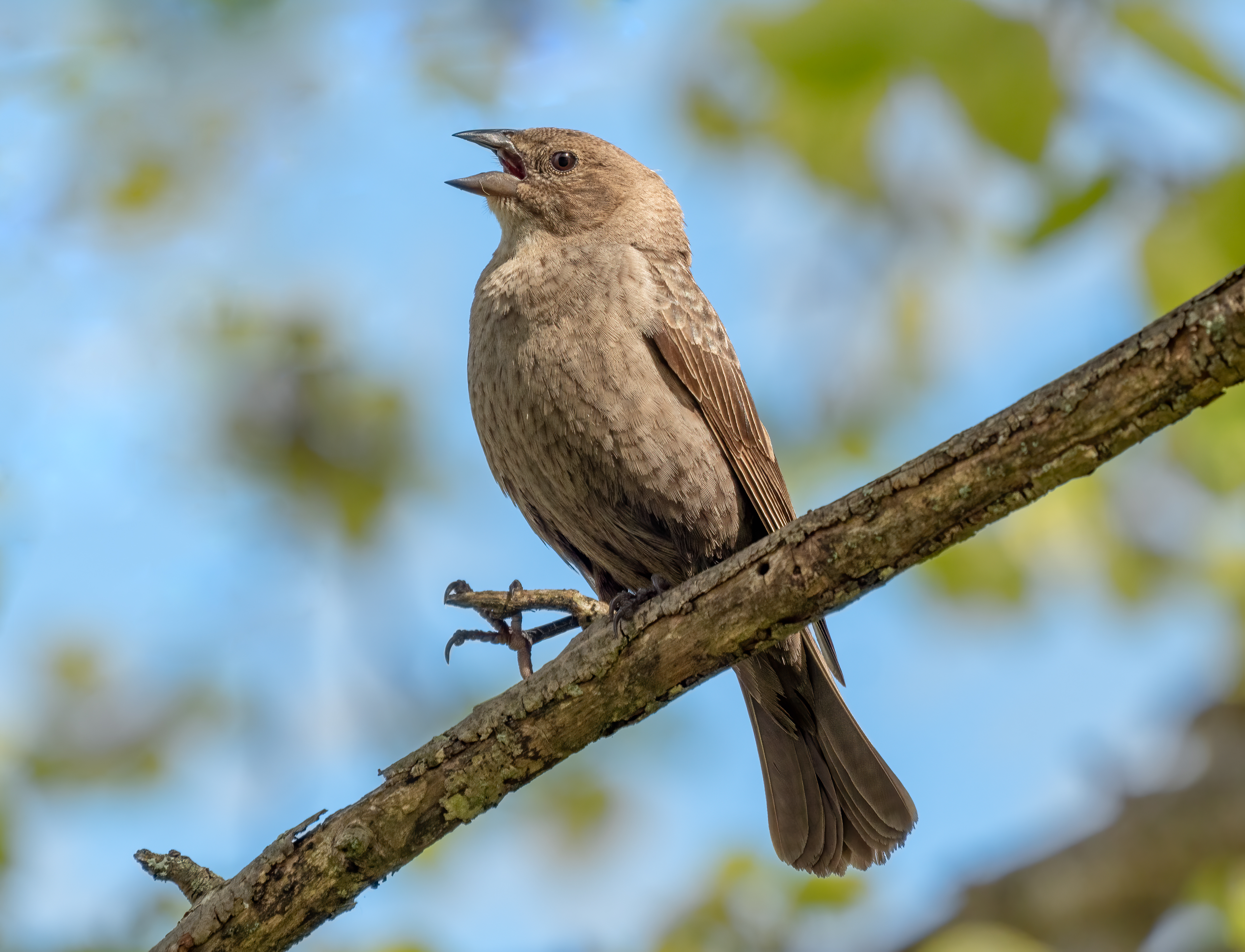
- Female brown-headed cowbird

Scientific classification
- Kingdom: Animalia
- Phylum: Chordata
- Class: Aves
- Order: Passeriformes
- Family: Icteridae
- Genus: Molothrus; Swainson, 1832

Type species
- Fringilla pecoris Gmelin, JF, 1789

Species
- M. rufoaxillaris; M. oryzivorus; M. bonariensis; M. aeneus; M. armenti; M. ater

= Cowbird =

Genus of birds

Cowbirds are birds belonging to the genus Molothrus in the family Icteridae. They are of New World origin and are obligate brood parasites, laying their eggs in the nests of other species.

The genus was introduced by English naturalist William Swainson in 1832 with the brown-headed cowbird (Molothrus ater) as the type species. The genus name combines the Ancient Greek mōlos, meaning "struggle" or "battle", with thrōskō, meaning "to sire" or "to impregnate". The English name "cowbird", first recorded in 1839, refers to this species often being seen near cattle.

== Species ==
The genus contains the following six species:

Genus Molothrus – Swainson, 1832 – six species
Common name	Scientific name and subspecies	Range	Size and ecology	IUCN status and estimated population
Screaming cowbird	Molothrus rufoaxillaris Cassin, 1866	Northeast and central Argentina, southeast Bolivia, central Brazil and throughout Paraguay and Uruguay	Size: Habitat: Diet:	LC
Giant cowbird	Molothrus oryzivorus (Gmelin, JF, 1788) Two subspecies: M. o. impacifus (Peters, JL, 1929); M. o. oryzivorus (Gmelin, JF, 1788)	Southern Mexico south to northern Argentina, and on Trinidad and Tobago	Size: Habitat: Diet:	LC
Shiny cowbird Male Female	Molothrus bonariensis (Gmelin, JF, 1789) Seven subspecies: M. b. minimus Dalmas, 1900; M. b. cabanisii Cassin, 1866; M. b. venezuelensis Stone, 1891; M. b. aequatorialis Chapman, 1915; M. b. occidentalis Berlepsch & Stolzmann, 1892; M. b. riparius Griscom & Greenway, 1937; M. b. bonariensis (Gmelin, JF, 1789)	South America, the Caribbean, and Florida	Size: Habitat: Diet:	LC
Bronzed cowbird	Molothrus aeneus (Wagler, 1829) Three subspecies: M. a. loyei Parkes & Blake, 1965; M. a. assimilis (Nelson, 1900); M. a. aeneus (Wagler, 1829)	Southern U.S. states of California, Arizona, New Mexico, Texas, and Louisiana south through Central America to Panama	Size: Habitat: Diet:	LC
Bronze-brown cowbird	Molothrus armenti (Cabanis, 1851)	Colombia	Size: Habitat: Diet:	NT
Brown-headed cowbird Male Female	Molothrus ater (Boddaert, 1783) Three subspecies: M. a. artemisiae Grinnell, 1909; M. a. obscurus (Gmelin, JF, 1789); M. a. ater (Boddaert, 1783)	Southern Canada, United States, and Mexico	Size: Habitat: Diet:	LC

One extinct species, Molothrus resinosus, is known from fossil remains recovered from the Talara Tar Seeps of northwestern Peru, and likely went extinct during the late Quaternary. It may have been a close associate of Pleistocene megafauna communities, and may have gone extinct following their collapse in populations. The convex-billed cowbird (Pandanaris convexa) is another extinct species that likely co-evolved with the megafauna, though it is placed in its own genus.

The nonparasitic baywings were formerly placed in this genus; they are now classified as Agelaioides.

== Behavior ==
Cowbirds eat mostly insects and seeds. Some species follow ungulates to catch insects stirred up by the larger animals' grazing.

Cowbirds reproduce by laying their eggs in other birds' nests. Female cowbirds observe a potential host bird laying its eggs, and when the nest is left momentarily unattended, the cowbird lays its own egg in it. The female cowbird may continue to observe this nest after laying eggs. Some bird species have evolved the ability to detect such parasitic eggs, and may reject them by pushing them out of their nests, but female cowbirds have been observed to attack and destroy the remaining eggs of such birds in retaliation, as suggested by the Mafia hypothesis.
