= Gens (behaviour) =

Host-specific lineage of a brood parasite species

In animal behaviour, a gens (pl. gentes) or host race is a lineage of a brood parasite species that inherits phenotypic traits adapted for a specific type of host, even though the whole parasite species uses a larger variety of hosts. Brood parasitism is particularly well-known in birds such as the common cuckoo, which lays its eggs in the nests of other birds and exploits the parental effort of the host bird to raise the parasitic offspring.

Many species of avian brood parasite evolve to lay eggs that mimic their hosts' in appearance to reduce the chance that their eggs will be recognised and rejected by the hosts. Brood parasite species that evolve to have gentes are able to evolve close mimicry to a variety of host species with different egg appearances, but individual birds raised by different hosts can breed together without the risk of changing the specialized phenotypes of their eggs. A gens may be specialized to parasitise a few species of hosts with similar eggs, or one host species, or even a smaller subset of a single species with highly variable eggs.

The exact mechanisms of the evolution and maintenance of gentes is still a matter of some research, and it is likely that different species use a mixture of inheritance methods. However, gentes are often distinguished from subspecies when the brood parasite shows some degree of matrilineal inheritance, from mother to daughter. Since it is the female that both lays the eggs and chooses the host nests, this form of inheritance would reliably ensure that eggs with the correct phenotype are laid in the correct nests. This, in turn, reduces the chances of the eggs being rejected by the hosts, with about 5% of well-matched eggs compared to 72% of mismatched eggs rejected by cuckoo hosts. Matrilineal inheritance can be either genetic, based on sex chromosomes or mitochondria, or cultural, with mate choice based on a common host species or nest environment.

In the common cuckoo, it is believed that gens-specific properties are sex-linked and lie on the W chromosome of the female. The male cuckoo, like all male birds, has no W chromosome and could therefore mate with a female from any gens without affecting egg phenotype. However, common cuckoo gentes may also incorporate autosomal genes contributed by both parents. There is stronger evidence for matrilineal inheritance in the greater honeyguide based on whether they parasitize hosts that nest in trees or in burrows, but they also have additional host-specific differences in egg size and shape that are not matrilineal. The cuckoo-finch represents the clearest case of a species in which inheritance of egg phenotype on the W chromosome is probably the primary mechanism for the evolution of gentes. The most recently-diverged cuckoo-finch matrilines are those that specialize even more specifically on different egg phenotypes laid by the same host species, but cuckoo-finches breed as a mixed population regardless of which host they were raised by.

Not all brood parasite species have gentes, although relatively few species have been studied well enough to be certain how common the phenomenon is. Species that are already highly specialized, such as indigobirds or the screaming cowbird, are not likely to have gentes. On the other hand, not all generalist brood parasites that use a wide variety of hosts have gentes either. As in the shiny cowbird, where females show host preferences matched by differences in egg characteristics and which also have some genetic divergence, the distinction can still be unclear. The conditions that a female brood parasite is raised in may affect the egg size of that female later in life, as in the shiny cowbird and greater honeyguide examples, and reinforce a host-specific phenotype based on egg size. Alternatively, some brood parasites may imprint on the habitat or the nest they were raised in, and choose mates and hosts accordingly. Finally, any brood parasite species that uses a large variety of hosts may have subspecies that use a smaller subset of hosts than the whole population, but these are distinguished from gentes because their breeding populations are more isolated from others.
