= Mafia hypothesis =

Hypothesis in biology

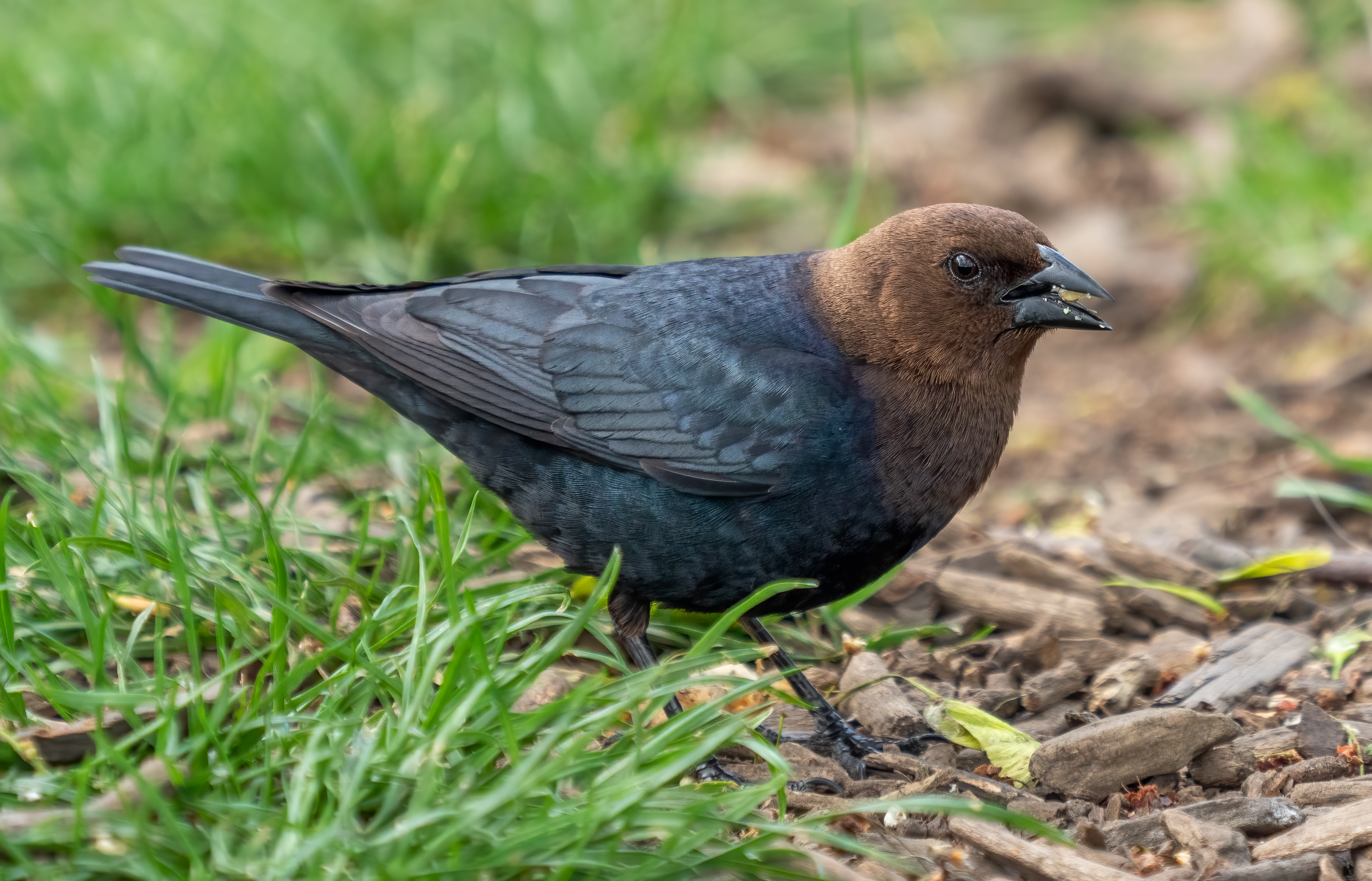
The brown-headed cowbird (Molothrus ater) engages in brood parasitism and may also conduct retaliatory mafia behavior if its eggs are rejected by a host.

In ornithology, the mafia hypothesis is an explanation of why nesting host species do not reject the eggs of brood parasites. The parasite eggs are accepted by the host to avoid retaliation (egg destruction, nest destruction, and/or the killing of nestlings) by the brood parasite, in an example of coevolution. Amotz Zahavi proposed it in 1979, and it was tested by Manuel Soler in 1995.

== Mathematical modeling ==
Maria Abou Chakra of the Max Planck Institute for Evolutionary Biology, with others, successfully mathematically modeled the mafia hypothesis as a viable strategy, conditional on two factors:

- hosts are capable of learning
- parasites revisit nests

They found that the proportion of mafia versus non-mafia brood parasites, and unconditionally versus conditionally accepting hosts cycled over time. If all hosts unconditionally accepted parasite eggs, then it would not be worth the parasite's effort to revisit the nest to conduct a mafia retaliation. If sufficiently few parasites were mafia, then only accepting parasite eggs after nest destruction once would be best for the hosts. As such, the mafia proportion of parasites would increase, thereby leading to unconditional acceptance by hosts, and so on.

== Farmer strategy ==
Nest or egg destruction may occur as a result of "farming", or attempts by the parasite to synchronize the hosts' schedule with the parasites'. It bears similarities to the mafia strategy in that both engage in depredation of nests.

The farmer strategy complicates the mafia/non, un/conditional acceptance model, as in the case of farmers, rejection enters as a viable third host strategy.

== Evidence against mafia hypothesis ==
In a long-term study which focused on brown-headed cowbird parasitism of dark-eyed junco nests, researchers found that removal of cowbird eggs did not result in retaliation by cowbirds. These results suggest that, at least in cowbirds, mafia behavior is sporadic or not characteristic of a population-level behavior.

Additionally, if mafia behavior were ubiquitous, it would be expected that frequently parasitized host species would exhibit a fixed behavior whereby they accept parasite eggs 100% of the time. This has not been demonstrated in any known cowbird host species.
