= Convex-billed cowbird =

Convex-billed cowbird Temporal range: Quaternary

Scientific classification
- Kingdom: Animalia
- Phylum: Chordata
- Class: Aves
- Order: Passeriformes
- Family: Icteridae
- Genus: †Pandanaris; Miller, 1947
- Species: †P. convexa

Binomial name
- †Pandanaris convexa Miller, 1947

Extinct species of bird

The convex-billed cowbird (Pandanaris convexa) is an extinct species of bird in the family Icteridae, described in 1947 by Alden H. Miller. It is the only member of its genus, Pandanaris.

== Physiology ==
Pandanaris convexa has an upper mandible (7.0 mm in length) similar to that of the extant cowbirds in the genus Molothrus, though its narial opening is approximately 30% larger. In addition, Miller found that the species' internarial bridge was entirely different from other cowbirds and blackbirds. The species has a distinct "even" curvature of its culmen that is not found in any other icterid.

== Distribution ==
Based on fossil evidence, the convex-billed cowbird had a large distribution throughout the Americas. The first remains were from the La Brea Tar Pits in California, and remains have also been found in Florida. Other remains have also been found at San Clemente de Térapa in the Mexican state of Sonora, mixed with the remains of extant icterid species such as the red-winged blackbird (Agelaius phoeniceus) and orchard oriole (Icterus spurius).

== Extinction ==
Along with many other birds of the late Quaternary, the convex-billed cowbird likely co-evolved with Pleistocene megafauna, inhabiting the grassland habitats that were shaped by these species and feeding on the insects that their foraging stirred up. With the eventual extinction of the megafauna, Pandanaris was unable to adapt to the altered conditions and eventually went extinct. The other still-extant icterid species that also inhabited the same areas, such as the red-winged blackbirds and orchard orioles, may have also been extirpated from these altered habitats, but the species as a whole were able to tolerate them, with some populations surviving in other areas and later recolonizing the altered habitats they were previously extirpated from. In contrast, Pandanaris may have been so wholly dependent on megafaunal communities that it could not tolerate the altered habitats and went fully went extinct throughout its range.
