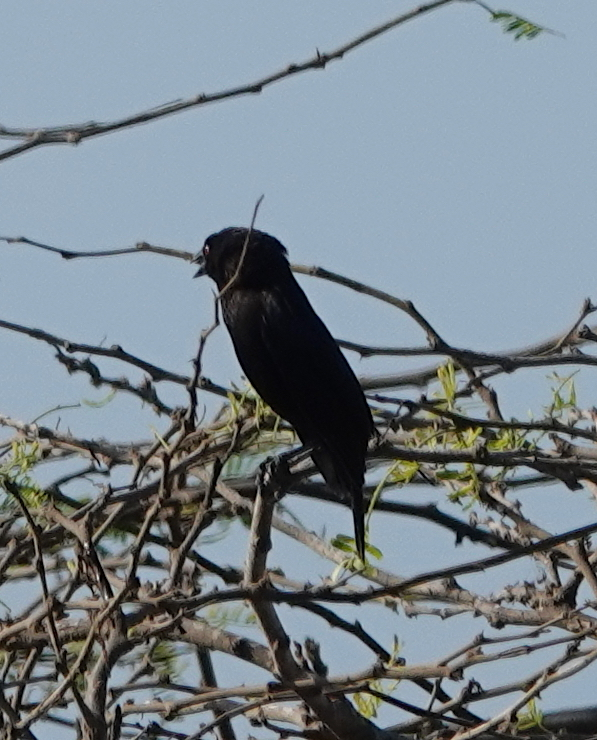

Conservation status
- Near Threatened (IUCN 3.1)

Scientific classification
- Kingdom: Animalia
- Phylum: Chordata
- Class: Aves
- Order: Passeriformes
- Family: Icteridae
- Genus: Molothrus
- Species: M. armenti

Binomial name
- Molothrus armenti Cabanis, 1851

= Bronze-brown cowbird =

Species of bird in the Americas

The bronze-brown cowbird (Molothrus armenti) is a species of bird in the family Icteridae. It was long thought to be an isolated population of bronzed cowbird. Because it is found only in a narrow coastal band in northwestern Colombia, it is considered near-threatened by the International Union for Conservation of Nature.
