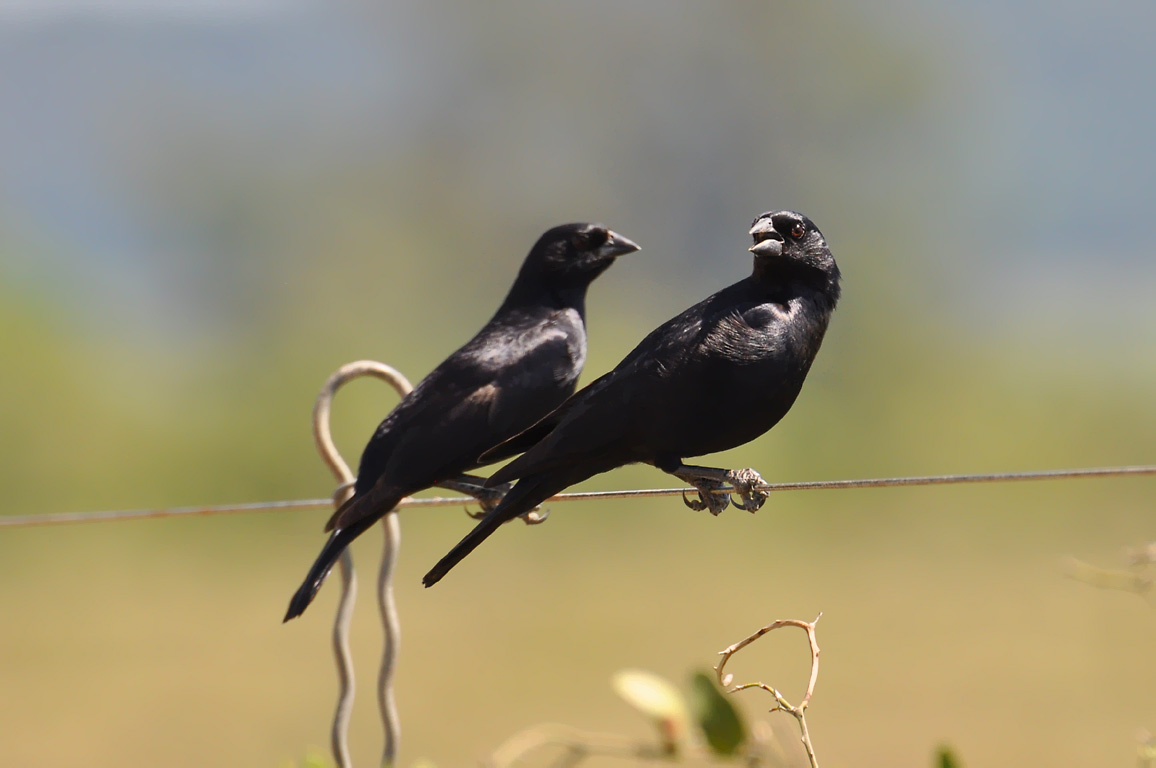

Conservation status
- Least Concern (IUCN 3.1)

Scientific classification
- Kingdom: Animalia
- Phylum: Chordata
- Class: Aves
- Order: Passeriformes
- Family: Icteridae
- Genus: Molothrus
- Species: M. rufoaxillaris

Binomial name
- Molothrus rufoaxillaris Cassin, 1866
- Range of the screaming cowbird

Audio
- Screaming cowbird song

= Screaming cowbird =

Species of bird

The screaming cowbird (Molothrus rufoaxillaris) is an obligate brood parasite belonging to the family Icteridae and is found in South America. It is also known commonly as the short billed cowbird.

== Description ==
The screaming cowbird has mildly iridescent black plumage; the lesser under-wing coverts are rufous. The female is slightly duller in colour than the male. The legs are black and the iris is reddish brown. Adult body length is 18–21 cm and mean adult weight is 58 g for males and 48 g for females. The call of the screaming cowbird was first described as "impetuous screaming notes"; however, a more useful description for field identification is noisy, explosive and piercing with rasp-like calls also produced. Screaming cowbirds are mostly seen in pairs or small flocks.

== Distribution and habitat ==
Within South America, the screaming cowbird is found in north east and central Argentina, south east Bolivia, central Brazil and throughout Paraguay and Uruguay. Its natural habitat is pastureland where it forages amongst grazing animals such as cows, hence the name "cowbird". Similar to other cowbirds, it forages predominantly on the ground, eating invertebrates that have been disturbed by grazing stock. The distribution of the screaming cowbird has increased significantly in recent decades due to habitat alteration caused by deforestation and by following its hosts into new areas. Both female and male screaming cowbirds show high fidelity in roosting locations.

== Reproduction ==
=== Host species ===
The screaming cowbird is a specialist brood parasite, predominantly parasitizing the nests of baywings (Agelaioides). In 1874, W H Hudson was first to observe this parasitic relationship when he witnessed what he believed to be baywing chicks morph into screaming cowbird plumage.

The screaming cowbird also parasitizes the nests of the chopi blackbird (Gnorimopsar chopi) and the brown-and-yellow marshbird (Pseudoleistes virescens). Parasitism of these other two species generally occurs in areas where baywings are absent but can also occur in its presence. The three host species that can successfully raise screaming cowbirds are all cooperative breeders. "Helpers" at the nest provide assistance with chick feeding and with predator defense.

=== Parasite behaviour ===
Screaming cowbirds are monogamous and form stable pairs for the duration of the breeding season. As obligate brood parasites, they do not build their own nests, and instead, parasitize the nests of other species, predominantly baywings.

Most baywing nests are parasitized by the screaming cowbird with parasitism rates of 74-100% recorded. Parasitism rates of 5-20% have been recorded for the brown and yellow marsh bird and 46% for the Chopi blackbird.

Screaming cowbird eggs are spotted like those of their main host, the baywing, but do vary in shape, background colour and markings. Although this may be obvious when they appear in the host nest during pre-laying, they can be difficult to detect in a nest full of eggs.

Screaming cowbirds can lay 6-20 eggs in a baywing nest but usually one pair will lay only 2 eggs in the host nest. Up to 12 female screaming cowbirds can parasitize the same baywing nest.

Screaming cowbird adults frequently pierce the eggs of their hosts as well as previously laid parasite eggs. One study found 22.5% of baywing eggs were punctured by the screaming cowbird. Screaming cowbirds can distinguish between their eggs and those of other species and laboratory trials have shown that screaming cowbirds will puncture shining cowbird (Molothrus bonariensis) eggs more frequently than their own. The purposes of egg puncture behavior are not clearly understood but may provide the parasite with information on the embryonic development of the host eggs and therefore whether or not to parasitize. Egg puncturing may also be practiced to reduce nestling competition and to enhance survival of parasitic offspring. Heavy predation in the form of egg punctures, which result in total nest failure and nest abandonment, may also create new opportunities for screaming cowbirds in the form of new nests to parasitize.

Screaming cowbirds deceive their main host, the baywing, with superb visual chick mimicry. In fact, screaming cowbirds are the only avian brood parasite to exhibit this trait. There are slight differences in skin and bill colour of nestlings but this is only present for the first 4–5 days. They then remain almost identical in size and appearance until they become nutritionally independent.

Screaming cowbird chicks also mimic the begging calls of their baywing nest mates and, in addition, beg for longer and at a higher intensity. This more intense begging does not reflect greater hunger demands; instead, reflects a hard-wired behavior to ensure adequate nourishment and survival. Although the rearing environment can influence begging call parameters, Screaming Cowbird nestlings develop the acoustic cues required for offspring recognition by the baywings independently of social experience. Due to the mimicry of nestlings and fledglings, it has been suggested that screaming cowbirds and baywings are closely related; however, molecular research has shown the species are not each other's closest relatives.

=== Host response ===
The screaming cowbird frequently parasitizes its main host, the baywing, during the pre-laying period. Screaming cowbirds lay 31% of their eggs before the first baywing egg but most of the eggs laid are ejected, and often within 24 hours. By ejecting parasitic eggs with their feet, baywings can reduce the parasitic egg load by 75%. Host species can eject an entire clutch and commence egg laying again in the same nest or abandon the nest and start afresh. Chopi blackbirds and brown and yellow marsh birds have not been observed to eject screaming cowbird eggs.

The pre-laying period (the time between nest making and egg laying) of the baywing exhibits great variability in length (1–19 days). It is suggested that this behavior may act as an antiparasitic/defense mechanism to reduce the chances of successful parasitism. Such behaviours are a fascinating element to the co-evolutionary arms race that exists between avian brood parasites and their hosts.

Once hatched, baywings treat parasitic chicks as their own, not only by providing food and protection but also by removing ecto-parasites such as botfly larvae.

=== Reproductive success ===
The main host, the baywing, can successfully fledge 1 screaming cowbird for 3 of its own. Reproductive success, as the number of fledgling per egg laid, has been recorded to be 0.14 for the screaming cowbird when hosted by the baywing. When hosted by the chopi blackbird, a reproductive success rate of 0.17 was found In addition, the brown-and-yellow marshbird is also able to successfully rear screaming cowbird chicks.

The main host species, the baywing, clearly suffers losses through intense parasitism by the screaming cowbird; however, they are able to successfully raise their young with little overall impact in terms of hatching success, survival of nestlings and fledgling body mass.
