= Habitat-selection hypothesis =

Concept in ecology

Habitat selection hypothesis describes how an organism's habitat in a juvenile life stage affects their behavior in their adult life. Another term is natal habitat preference induction (NHPI), which is a mechanism that is typically described as host selection which typically occurs through habitat imprinting in early post-natal development. This theory argues that an adult would choose an environment post-dispersal that has similar stimuli as their early development. This mechanism is thought to improve fitness of the individual and has been found in many species across different taxa, such as insects, fish, amphibians, mammals and birds.

One of the first hypotheses regarding habitat selection hypothesis was Andrew Hopkins' host selection principle (HHSP), first proposed in 1916, which states that many adult insects prefer the host species they developed on. This principle has faced some controversy, but there is evidence that conditioning and genetic variation during a life span of an insect contributes to host preference on where the insect developed.

== Examples ==
It is one of several hypotheses that attempt to explain the mechanisms of brood parasite host selection in cuckoos. Cuckoos are not the only brood parasites, however the behavior is more rare in other groups of birds, including ducks, weavers, and cowbirds.

Brood parasites and their favored host species are known to coevolve, which means both are likely to possess specific adaptations and counter-adaptations. An example of such an evolutionary arms race between a brood parasite and its host, is the phenomenon of egg rejection and egg mimicry, its counter-adaptation. Cuckoo eggs have been found in the nests of over 100 different species, of which 11 have been identified as primary host species and a similar number as secondary. Egg patterns and coloring differs greatly between these host species, and the cuckoo eggs vary accordingly. Thus it is important for a female cuckoo to deposit her eggs in a nest corresponding to the same species as her foster parents, because if she were to select a different host species, that would likely entail a higher risk of egg rejection.

A female cuckoo retains recognition of certain stimuli, like vegetation, from experience with her natal habitat. This imprinting of the habitat type in which the female cuckoo was reared may cause her to subsequently return to this habitat type in order to lay eggs and therefore increases the likelihood of encountering the suitable host species, as most host species are known to be habitat specific. Thus, habitat selection is thought to allow for specific host selection by the female cuckoo. In some cases, an individual may choose a different habitat from their original imprint based on the reproductive success of conspecific individuals in the vicinity.

There are five hypotheses for host selection in cuckoos: Inherited preference, host imprinting, natal philopatry (returning to their own birthplace to lay eggs), nest site choice (preference based on egg and nest similarity), and habitat selection. Although the preponderance of evidence seems to be in favor of the habitat selection hypothesis, some evidence for natal philopatry has been observed in cuckoos and the majority of cuckoo eggs are found in nests and among eggs matching their foster species, which supports the nest site choice hypothesis, but does not invalidate any of the other hypotheses. It could also be the case that there is more than one mechanism of host selection at play here. In their 1997 study, Teuschl et al. suggest the possibility of a hierarchical decision process consisting of three steps: 1) upon returning from their spring migration the female cuckoos go back to the approximate location of their birthplace, which should increase the likelihood of them finding a familiar habitat, 2) choosing a suitable habitat based on habitat imprinting, 3) choosing a suitable nest within that habitat.
