= Daniel B. Warnell School of Forestry and Natural Resources =

Coordinates: 33°56′38.5″N 83°22′28″W

University of Georgia Daniel B. Warnell School of Forestry and Natural Resources
- Type: Public
- Established: 1906
- Dean: Dr. J. Todd Petty
- Location: Athens, Georgia, USA
- Website: http://www.warnell.uga.edu/

The Daniel B. Warnell School of Forestry and Natural Resources (WSFNR) is a college within the University of Georgia (UGA) in Athens, Georgia, United States.

== History ==
The college was founded in 1906 as the Department of Forestry in the College of Agriculture through an endowment from George Foster Peabody. A reorganization of the department occurred in 1935 and it was also renamed the George Foster Peabody School of Forestry. Another name change occurred in 1968 to the School of Forest Resources, and in 1991 to the Daniel B. Warnell School of Forest Resources. The Georgia Board of Regents approved the change to its current name in 2006.

The school is named after Daniel B. Warnell, a native Georgian who was involved in the management of banking, farming, and timber enterprises and served in the Georgia House of Representatives from 1931 to 1937 and in the Georgia Senate from 1937 to 1939. The school was dedicated to Warnell in 1991.

== Degrees offered ==
The first Master of Science (MS) degree was awarded in 1932. The Master of Forest Resources (MFR) degree, which was titled the Master of Forestry until 1970, was initially approved and first awarded in 1950. The Doctor of Philosophy (Ph.D.) degree was initially approved in 1963 and first awarded in 1964. WSFNR offers the Bachelor of Science in Forest Resources (BSFR), Natural Resources Recreation and Tourism (NRRT), Fisheries and Wildlife (FSNR) in addition to Soils and Hydrology.
