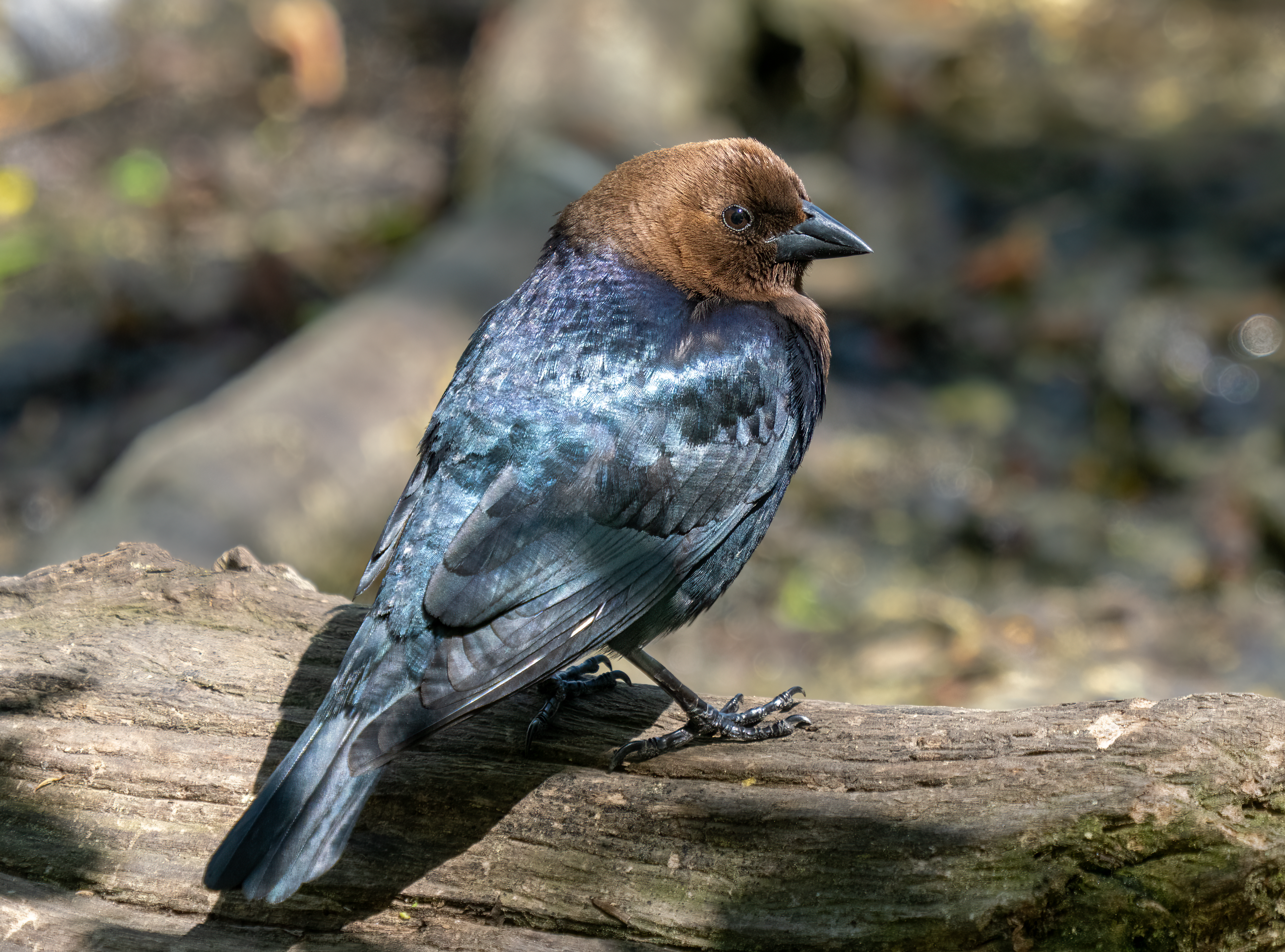
- Adult male
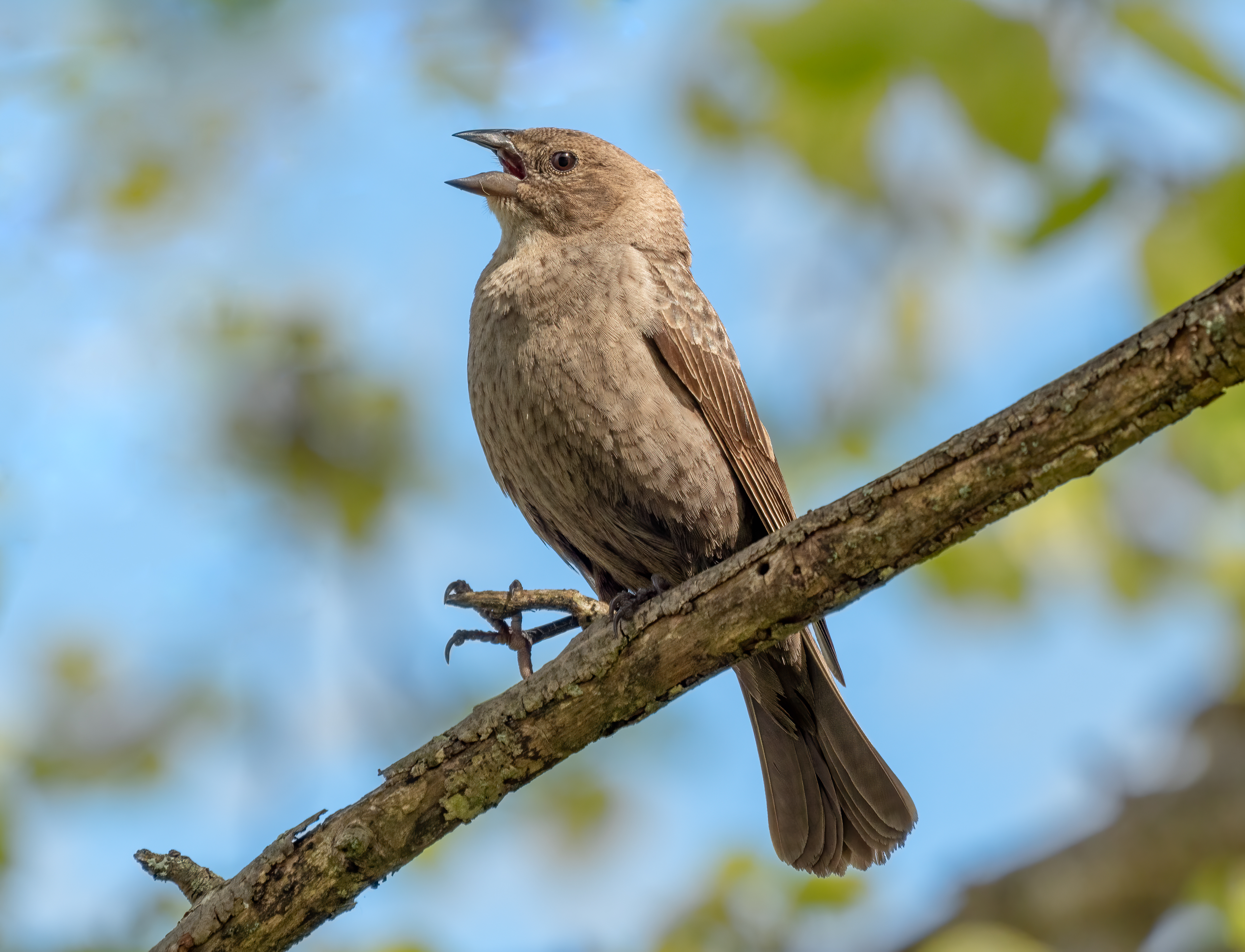
- Adult female

Conservation status
- Least Concern (IUCN 3.1)

Scientific classification
- Kingdom: Animalia
- Phylum: Chordata
- Class: Aves
- Order: Passeriformes
- Family: Icteridae
- Genus: Molothrus
- Species: M. ater

Binomial name
- Molothrus ater (Boddaert, 1783)
- Breeding range Year-round range Wintering range

= Brown-headed cowbird =

Brown-headed cowbird Temporal range: 0.5–0 Ma

Species of bird

The brown-headed cowbird (Molothrus ater) is a small, obligate brood parasitic icterid native to temperate and subtropical North America. It is a permanent resident in the southern parts of its range; northern birds migrate to the southern United States and Mexico in winter, returning to their summer habitat around March or April.

== Taxonomy ==
The brown-headed cowbird was described by the French polymath Georges-Louis Leclerc, Comte de Buffon in 1775 in his Histoire Naturelle des Oiseaux from a specimen collected in the Carolinas. The bird was also illustrated in a hand-colored plate engraved by François-Nicolas Martinet in the Planches Enluminées D'Histoire Naturelle, which was produced under the supervision of Edme-Louis Daubenton to accompany Buffon's text. Neither the plate caption nor Buffon's description included a scientific name, but in 1783, Dutch naturalist Pieter Boddaert coined the binomial name Oriolus ater in his catalogue of the Planches Enluminées. The brown-headed cowbird is now placed in the genus Molothrus that was introduced by English naturalist William Swainson in 1832 with the brown-headed cowbird as the type species. The genus name combines the Ancient Greek mōlos meaning "struggle" or "battle" with thrōskō meaning "to sire" or "to impregnate". The specific name ater is Latin for "dull black". The English name "cowbird", first recorded in 1839, refers to this species often being seen near cattle.

Three subspecies are recognised:

- M. a. artemisiae Grinnell, 1909 – interior west Canada and west USA
- M. a. obscurus (Gmelin, JF, 1789) – coastal Alaska, Canada, USA, and northwest Mexico
- M. a. ater (Boddaert, 1783) – southeast Canada, east and central USA, and northeast Mexico

== Description ==
Brown-headed cowbird call

The brown-headed cowbird is typical for an icterid in general shape, but is distinguished by its finch-like head and beak and smaller size. The adult male is iridescent black in color with a brown head. The adult female is slightly smaller and is dull grey with a pale throat and very fine streaking on the underparts. Their total length is 16–22 cm (6.3–8.7 in) and the average wingspan is 36 cm (14 in). Body mass can range from 30–60 g (1.1–2.1 oz), with females averaging 38.8 g (1.37 oz) against the males' average of 49 g (1.7 oz).

== Distribution and habitat ==
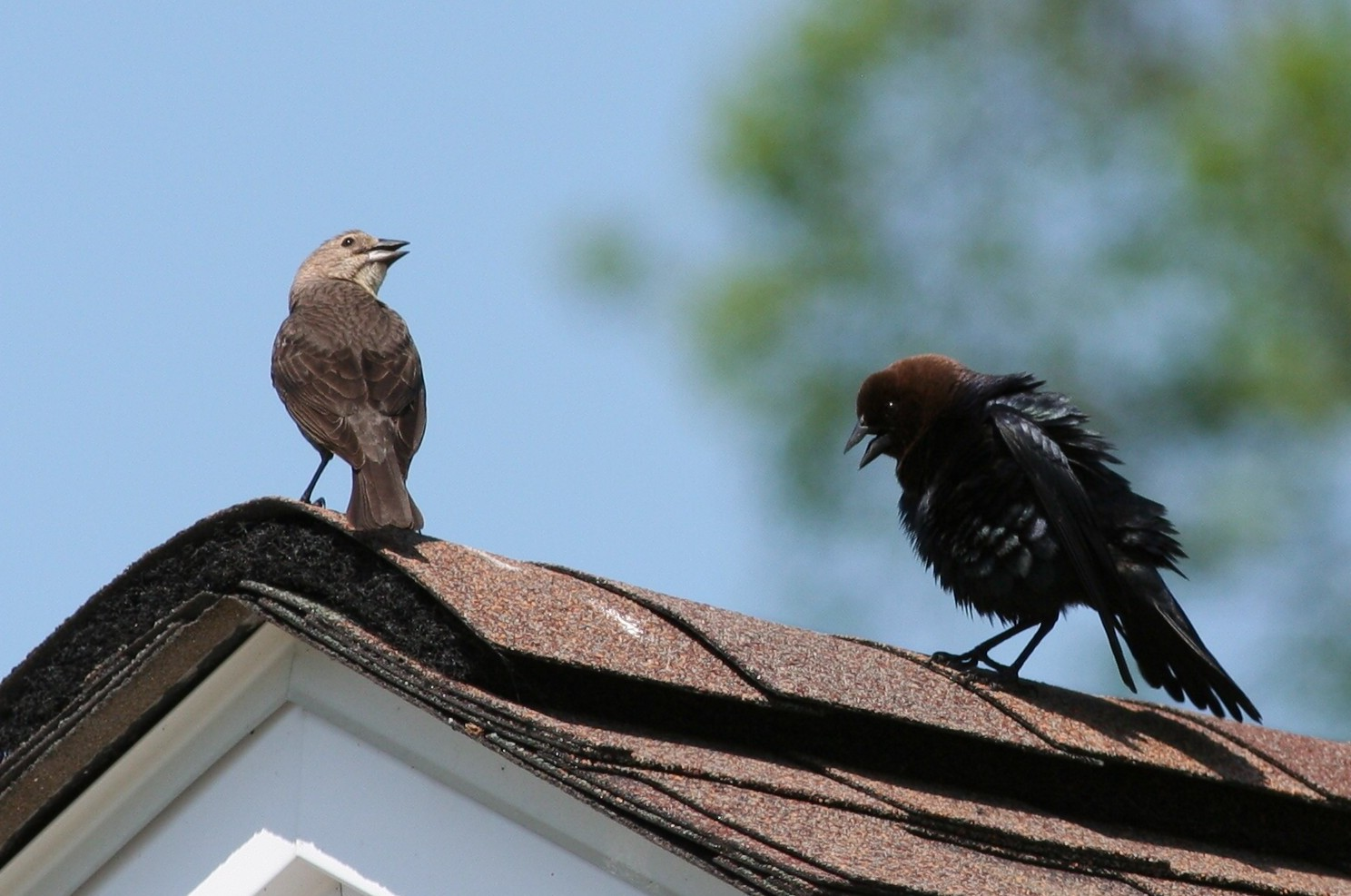
Brown-headed cowbird male (right) courting female

The species lives in open or semiopen country, and often travels in flocks, sometimes mixed with red-winged blackbirds (particularly in spring) and bobolinks (particularly in fall), as well as common grackles or European starlings. These birds forage on the ground, often following grazing animals such as horses and cattle to catch insects stirred up by the larger animals. They mainly eat seeds, insects and rarely, berries.

Before European settlement, brown-headed cowbirds followed bison herds across the prairies. Though the population of bison was dramatically reduced in fhe 20th century, this species was able to adapt and benefit from the introduction of new grazing animals by settlers across North America. The brown-headed cowbird can thus be considered an example of evolutionary anachronism.

The population and range of brown-headed cowbirds expanded with the clearing of forested areas by humans. They are commonly seen at suburban birdfeeders.

In 2012, brown-headed cowbirds in northwest Riverside County, CA tested positive for West Nile Virus.

== Behavior and ecology ==
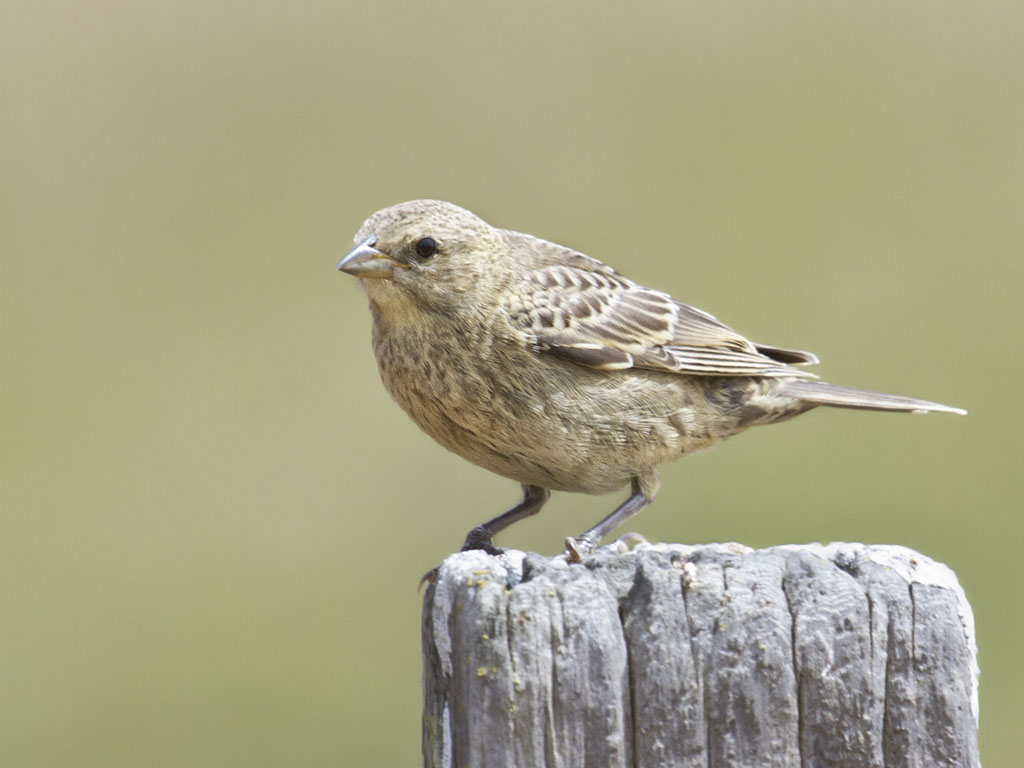
Juvenile in California

=== Brood parasitism ===
The brown-headed cowbird is an obligate brood parasite; it lays its eggs in the nests of other small passerines (perching birds), particularly those that build cup-like nests. The brown-headed cowbird eggs have been documented in nests of at least 220 host species, including hummingbirds and raptors. More than 140 different species of birds are known to have raised young cowbirds. The young cowbird is fed by the host parents at the expense of their own young. Brown-headed cowbird females can lay up to 40 eggs in a season.

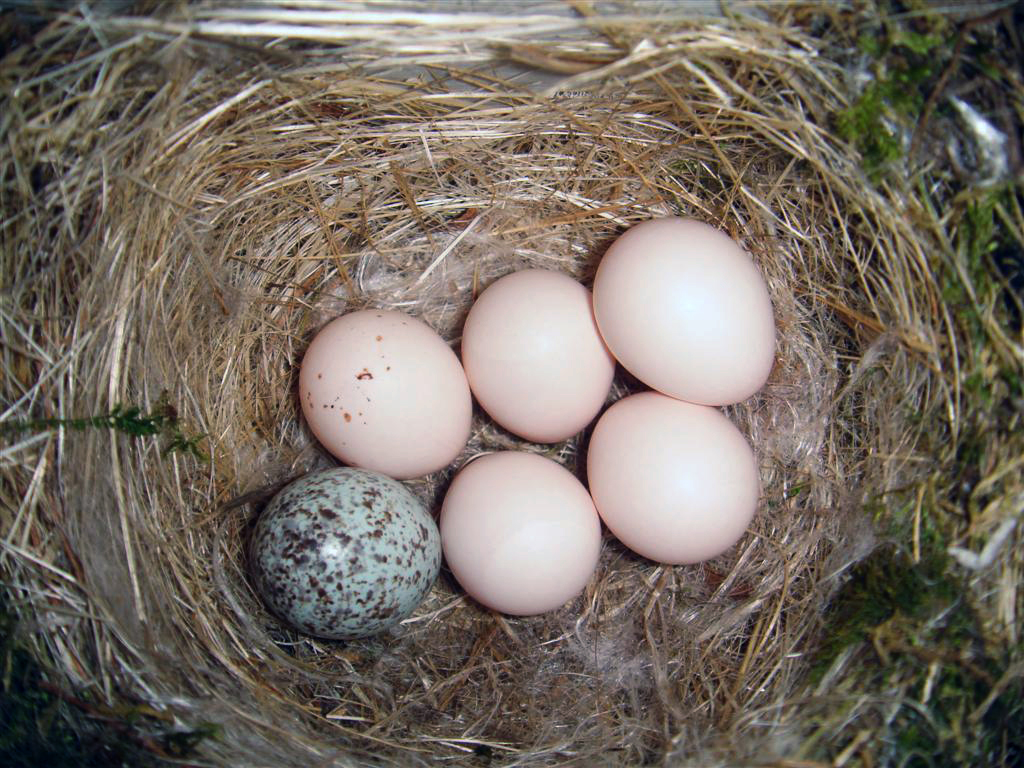
Eastern phoebe nest with one brown-headed cowbird egg

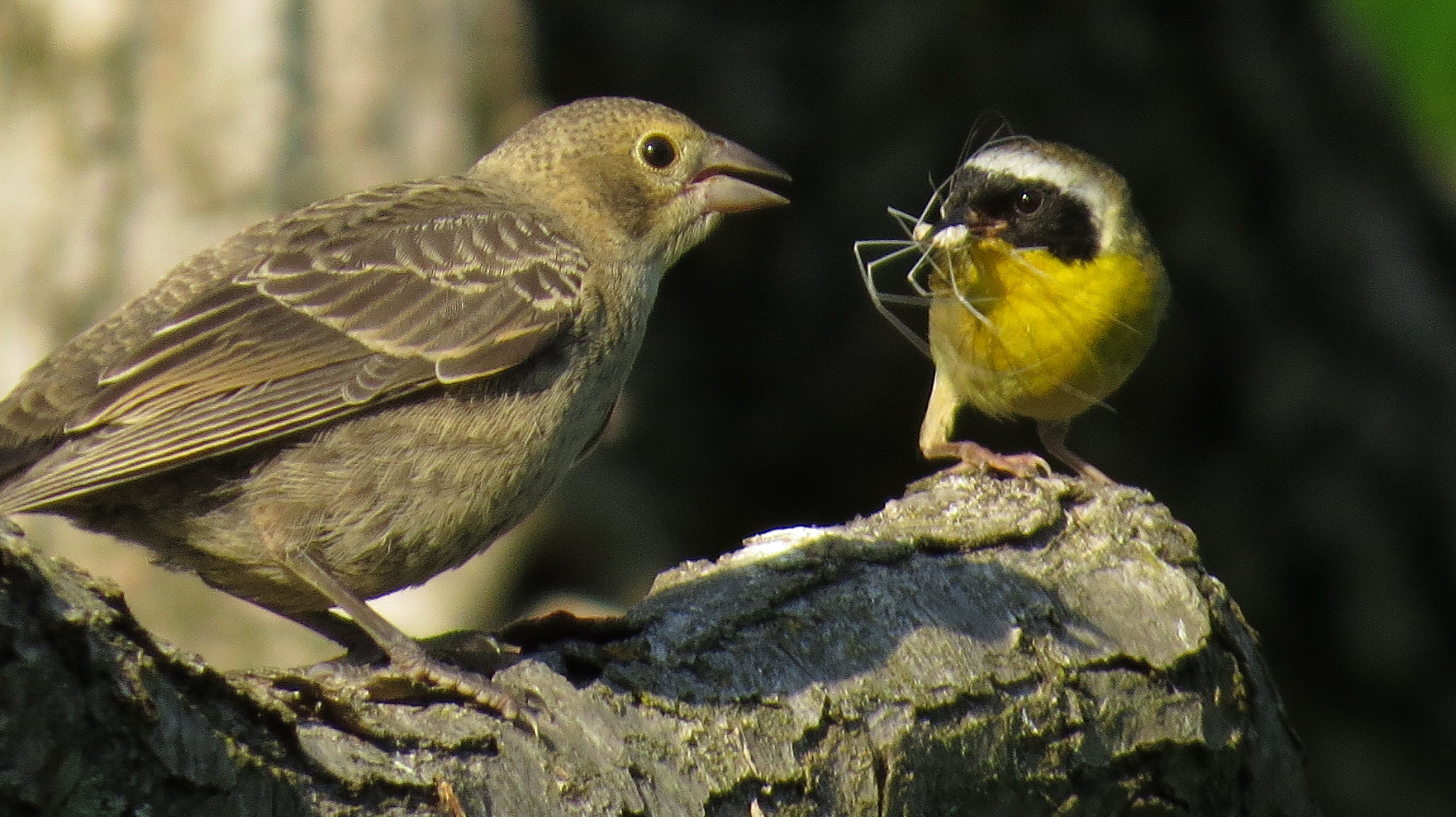
Common yellowthroat feeding juvenile brown-headed cowbird

==== Host response ====
Some host species, such as the house finch, feed their young an herbivorous diet. This is unsuitable for young brown-headed cowbirds, meaning few survive to fledge. Accepting a cowbird egg and rearing a cowbird chick can be costly to a host species. In the American redstart, nests parasitized by cowbirds were found to have a higher rate of predation, likely due in part to the loud begging calls by the cowbird nestling, but also partly explained by the fact that nests likely to be parasitized are also more likely to be preyed upon.

Unlike the common cuckoo, the brown-headed cowbird is not divided into gentes whose eggs imitate those of a particular host. Host species sometimes notice the cowbird egg, with different hosts reacting to the egg in different ways. Some, like the blue-grey gnatcatcher, abandon their nest, losing their own eggs as well. Others, like the American yellow warbler, bury the foreign egg under nest material, where it perishes. The brown thrasher physically ejects the egg from the nest. Experiments with grey catbirds, a known cowbird host, have shown that this species rejects cowbird eggs more than 95% of the time. For this species, the cost of accepting cowbird eggs (i.e. the loss of their own eggs or nestlings through starvation or the actions of the nestling cowbird) was far higher than the cost of rejecting those eggs (i.e. where the host might conceivably eject its own egg accidentally). Brown-headed cowbird nestlings are also sometimes expelled from the nest. Nestlings of host species can also alter their behavior in response to the presence of a cowbird nestling.

==== Parasite response ====
Song sparrow nestlings in parasitized nests alter their vocalizations in frequency and amplitude so that they resemble the cowbird nestling, and these nestlings tend to be fed equally often as nestlings in unparasitized nests.

Brown-headed cowbirds seem to periodically check on their eggs and young after they have deposited them. Removal of the parasitic egg may trigger a retaliatory reaction termed "mafia behavior". According to one study the cowbird returned to ransack the nests of a range of host species 56% of the time when their egg was removed. In addition, the cowbird also destroyed nests in a type of "farming behavior" to force the hosts to build new ones. The cowbirds then laid their eggs in the new nests 85% of the time.

Young cowbirds are not exposed to species-typical visual and auditory information like other birds. Despite this, they are able to develop species-typical singing, social, and breeding behaviors. Cowbird brains are wired to respond to the vocalizations of other cowbirds, allowing young to find and join flocks of their own species. These vocalizations are consistent across all cowbird populations, and serve as a sort of species-recognition password. If a young cowbird is not exposed to these "password" vocalizations by a certain age, it will mistakenly imprint on the host species.

=== Male behavior and reproductive success ===
Social behaviors of cowbird males include aggressive, competitive singing bouts with other males and pair bonding and monogamy with females.

In lab experiments, brown-headed cowbirds which are exposed to more complex social environments have greater reproductive success

== Relationship to humans ==
With the expansion of its range and its parasitic behavior, the brown-headed cowbird is often regarded as a pest. People sometimes engage in cowbird control programs, with the intention of protecting species negatively impacted by the cowbirds' brood parasitism. A study of nests of Bell's vireo highlighted a potential limitation of these control programs, demonstrating that removal of cowbirds from a site may create an unintended consequence of increasing cowbird productivity on that site, because with fewer cowbirds, fewer parasitized nests are deserted, resulting in greater nest success for cowbirds.
