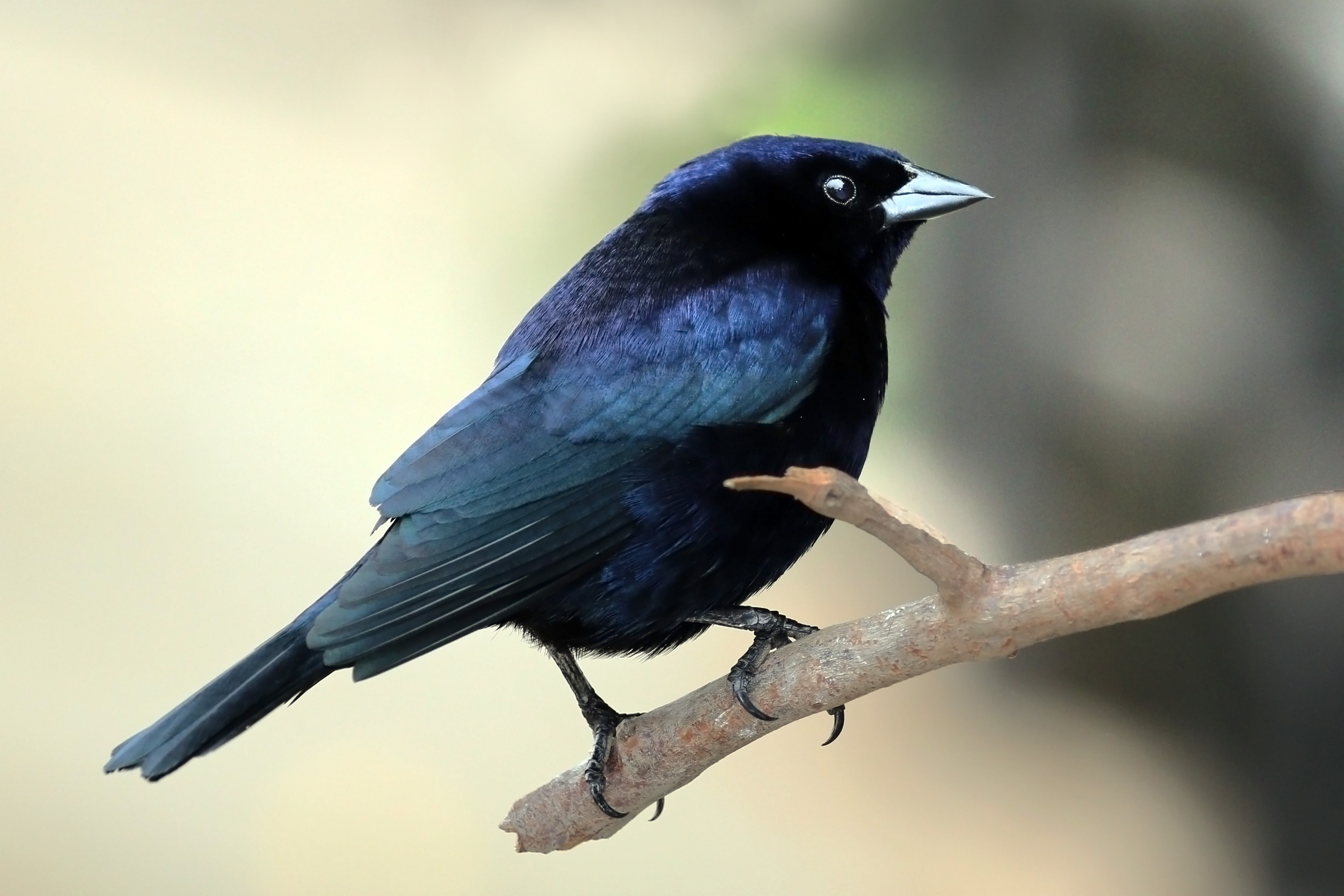
- Male
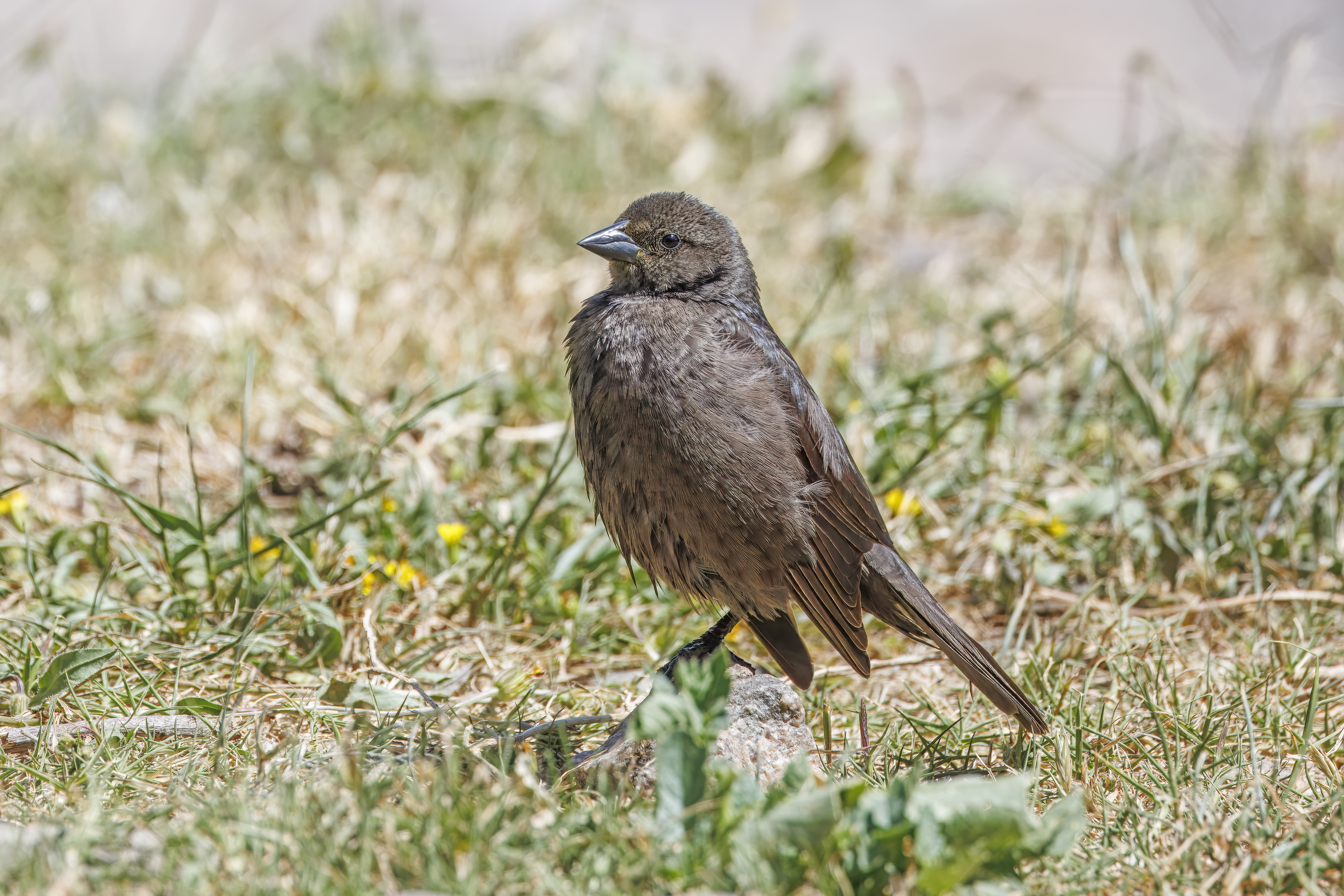
- Female

Conservation status
- Least Concern (IUCN 3.1)

Scientific classification
- Kingdom: Animalia
- Phylum: Chordata
- Class: Aves
- Order: Passeriformes
- Family: Icteridae
- Genus: Molothrus
- Species: M. bonariensis

Binomial name
- Molothrus bonariensis (Gmelin, JF, 1789)
- Resident

= Shiny cowbird =

Species of bird

The shiny cowbird (Molothrus bonariensis) is a passerine bird in the New World family Icteridae. It breeds in most of South America except for dense forests and areas of high altitude such as mountains. Since 1900 the shiny cowbird's range has shifted northward, and it was recorded in the Caribbean islands as well as the United States, where it is found breeding in southern Florida. It is a bird associated with open habitats, including disturbed land from agriculture and deforestation.

Adults are sexually dimorphic. Males are all black with a purple-blue iridescence. The female is smaller, with dull brown plumage that is sometimes paler on the underparts. Females of the species can be distinguished from the female brown-headed cowbird by their longer, finer bills and flatter heads. The shiny cowbird's diet consists mainly of insects, other arthropods and seeds, and they have been recorded foraging for grains in cattle troughs.

Like most other cowbirds, it is an obligate brood parasite, laying its eggs in the nests of many other bird species such as the rufous-collared sparrow. Different host species show different responses to their nests being parasitised, with behaviours ranging from accepting and caring for the cowbird eggs, to rejecting the eggs from the nest. As the shiny cowbird is an effective generalist brood parasite, it can be considered the South American counterpart to the brown-headed cowbird.

== Taxonomy ==
The shiny cowbird was formally described in 1789 by the German naturalist Johann Friedrich Gmelin in his revised and expanded edition of Carl Linnaeus's Systema Naturae. He placed it with the tanagers in the genus Tangara and coined the binomial name Tanagra bonariensis. The specific epithet is Modern Latin for Buenos Aires, the type location. Gmelin based his description on "le tangavio" from Buenos Aires that had been described in 1778 by the French polymath the Comte de Buffon. A hand-coloured engraving by François-Nicolas Martinet was published separately to accompany Buffon's text. The shiny cowbird is now one of six cowbirds placed in the genus Molothrus that was introduced in 1832 by William Swainson.

Seven subspecies are recognised:

- M. b. minimus Dalmas, 1900 – south Florida (southeast USA), West Indies, the Guianas and north Brazil
- M. b. cabanisii Cassin, 1866 – east Costa Rica to west Colombia
- M. b. venezuelensis Stone, 1891 – east Colombia and north Venezuela
- M. b. aequatorialis Chapman, 1915 – southwest Colombia and west Ecuador
- M. b. occidentalis Berlepsch & Stolzmann, 1892 – southwest Ecuador and west Peru
- M. b. riparius Griscom & Greenway, 1937 – east Ecuador, east Peru and west Brazil
- M. b. bonariensis (Gmelin, JF, 1789) – central, east Brazil to central Chile, Bolivia and central south Argentina
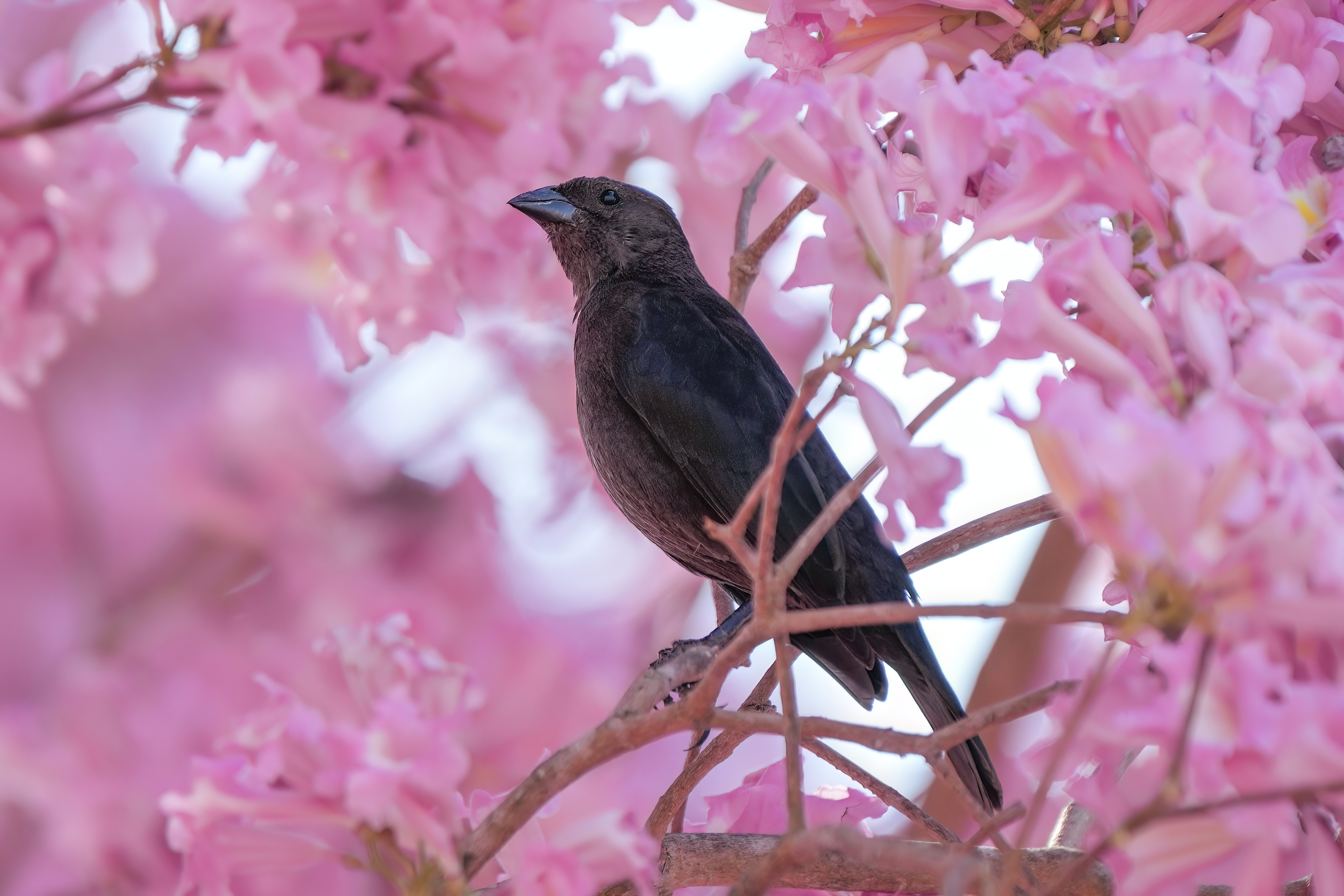
Female M. b. bonariensis in Mato Grosso, Brazil

== Description ==
The physical appearance of the shiny cowbird adult depends on the subspecies. Sizes range from 31–40 grams (1.1–1.4 oz) in mass and 18 cm (7.1 in) in length (M. b. minimus), to 55–65 grams (1.9–2.3 oz) in mass and 22 cm (8.7 in) in length (M. b. cabanisii).

Basic adult plumage for M. b. bonariensis is black with purple-blue iridescence for males, and dusty gray-brown for females. M. b. cabanisii males have plumage similar to M. b. bonariensis, while females are paler in colouration. M. b. aequatorialis males have violet iridescence and females are dark in colour. M. b. occidentalis males have rich purple iridescence, and females are distinct compared to the other subspecies as they have a pale upper body and very pale, streaked underparts. M. b. venezuelensis males look similar to M. b. occidentalis, and females dark in colour. M. b. minimus males look similar to M. b. bonariensis, and females have a darker head than M. b. bonariensis and have streaked scapulars and inter-scapulars. M. b. riparius males are similar to M. b. bonariensis, and the females have darker upper bodies and paler underparts than M. b. bonariensis.

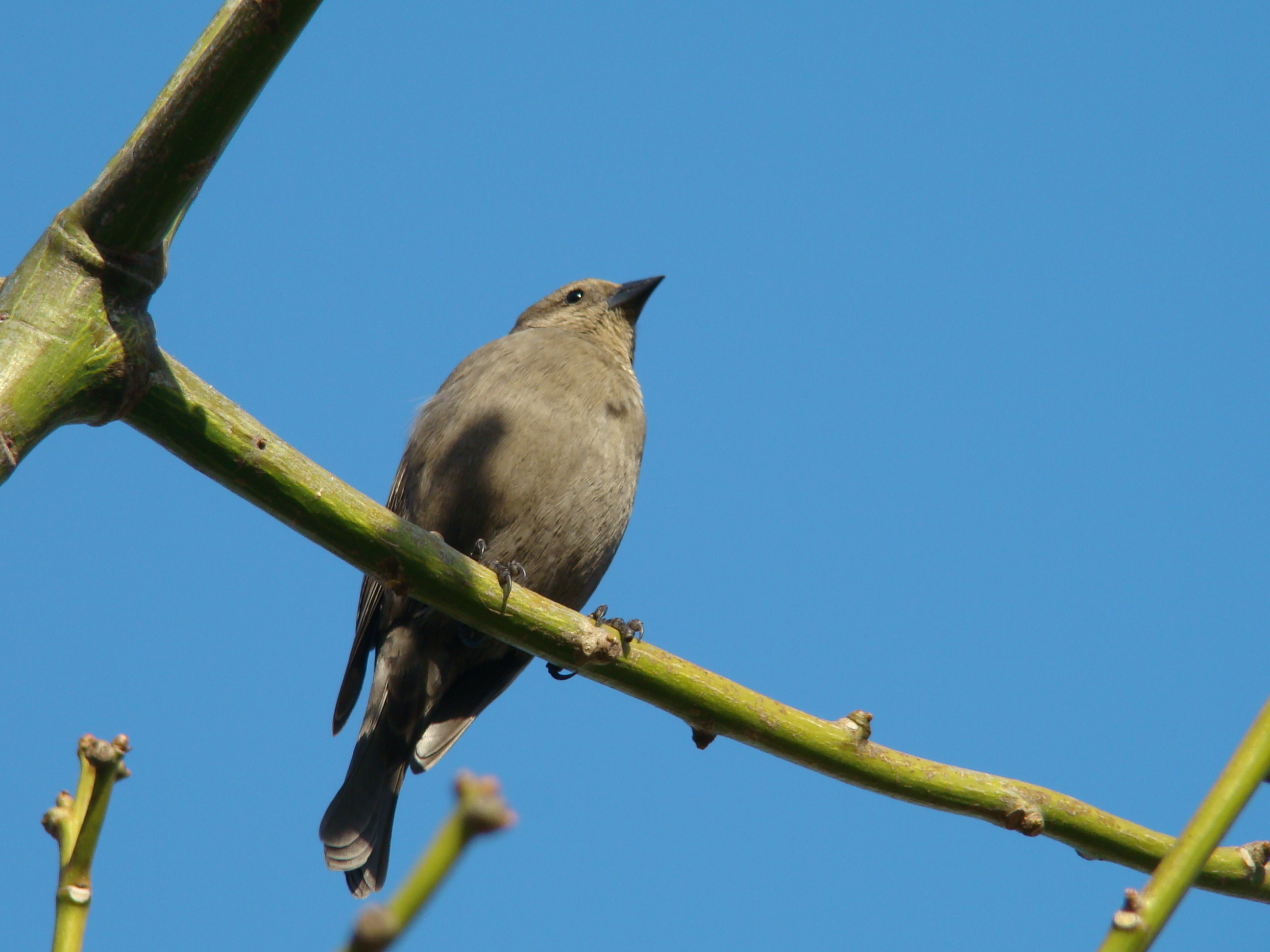
Female shiny cowbird

Upon hatching, shiny cowbirds are altricial and are confined to their nests. Hatchlings are covered in a gray down. Juvenile males are dark on their upper body, with dull dray underparts streaked with dark brown or black, and a buff abdomen. Females are a buff brown colour on top, with light buff, brown, or gray underparts that may or may not be streaked with brown.

Eggs are ovate in shape and can exist as either a spotted morph or an unspotted "immaculate" morph. They are usually white in colour, though they sometimes take on a light blue, light gray, or buff hue.

== Distribution and habitat ==
The shiny cowbird is a year-round resident across most of South America, where it lives in open areas such as open forests and cultivated land. Within the last century, the range of the species has shifted northward, and birds have been recorded in the West Indies and southern Florida. This shift in range is due to increased human conversion of forests into open cultivated and agricultural land, habitats which are preferred by the shiny cowbird. This range shift into new regions allows the cowbird to exploit new naive host species.

=== Effect of deforestation ===
Grouping of males

Deforestation and conversion of forested land to open agricultural fields and pastures have led to a northward shift in the range of the shiny cowbird, as this species prefers open habitats. These deforested areas may be home to host species that were previously not parasitized by cowbirds. These naive hosts likely do not have defenses against parasitism, and may be more negatively affected by the presence of the cowbirds. The species spread from South America to mainland Puerto Rico in 1955, and subsequently reached the Dominican Republic in 1973, and Cuba in 1982. Since 1985, the shiny cowbird has been recorded in Florida.

== Behaviour and ecology ==
=== Breeding ===
==== Sexual behaviour and courtship ====
Shiny cowbirds do not form monogamous pairs. They have a promiscuous mating system where individuals will copulate with many different mates.

During courtship, male shiny cowbirds perform a song while circling a female, and when the song is finished they bow to their prospective mate. This bow is a display used in both mating rituals and as a show of aggression toward other males. It consists of the male ruffling his feathers while arching his wings and lowering his tail. The display is performed either on the ground, in a tree, or while flying. Following a successful mating display, the pair will copulate once.

==== Brood parasitism ====
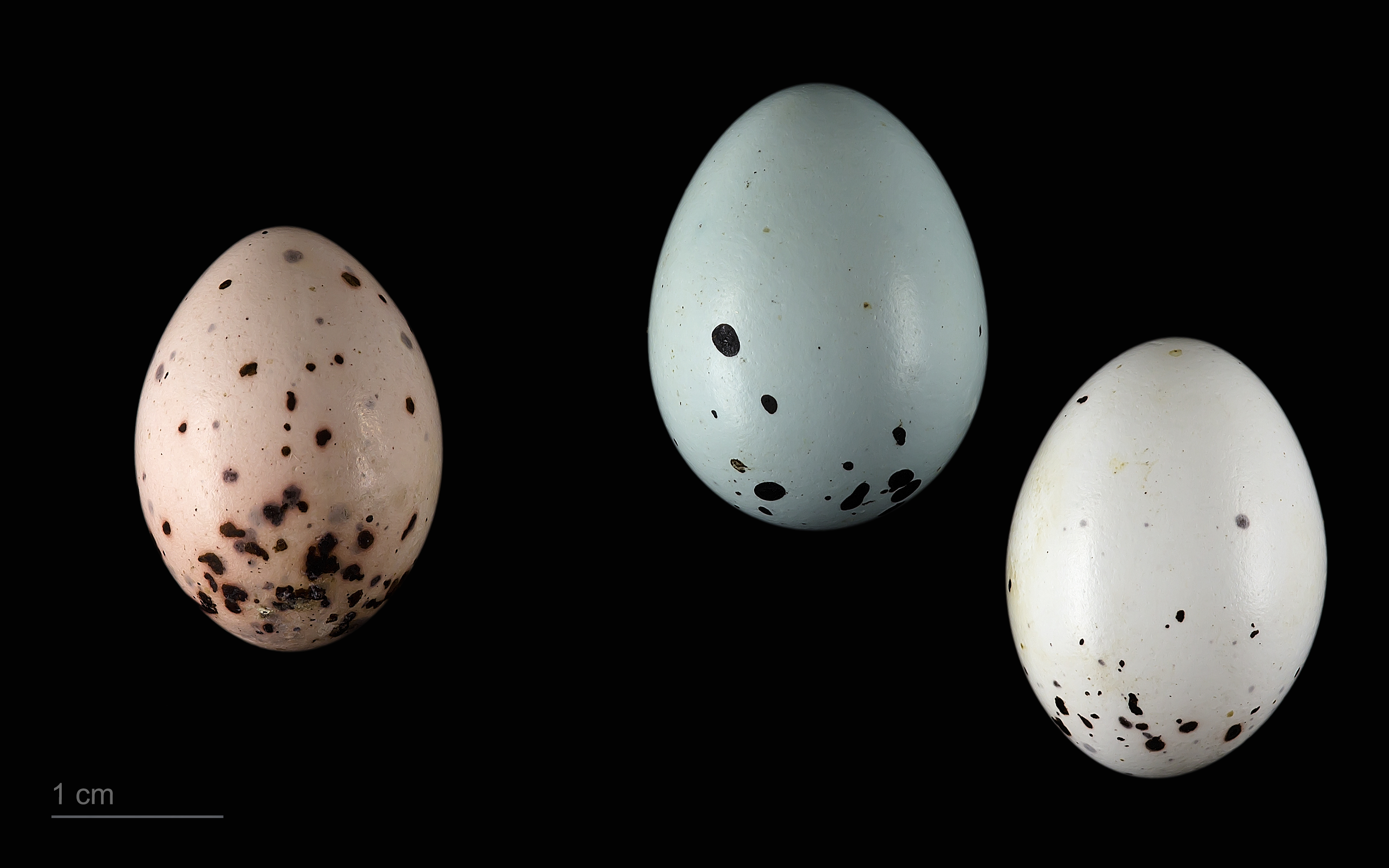
Molothrus bonariensis in a clutch of Curaeus curaeus - MHNT

The shiny cowbird is an obligate brood parasite, meaning that adults will lay their eggs in the nests of other species and their offspring rely entirely on their hosts for parental care. They are generalists, and have about 250 different host species. As a host generalist, their young are non-mimetic, meaning they do not attempt to replicate the behaviours of host chicks like a host specialist species might. In regions of South America including Argentina, Uruguay, Brazil, and Venezuela, the main host species of the shiny cowbird is the rufous-collared sparrow.

Female shiny cowbirds do not build nests, as they rely on their hosts to care for their offspring, but they will preferentially select hosts that build enclosed nests such as nests built in cavities. They will look for host nests both actively, and by silently watching for hosts. When a host nest is found, they will flush the host away from the nest by noisily flying around the area. An individual shiny cowbird may lay its eggs across many different nests.

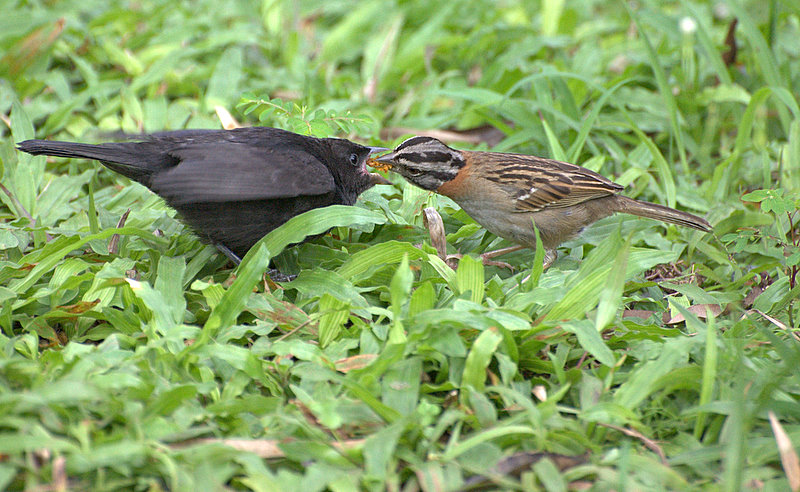
A juvenile (left) being fed by a rufous-collared sparrow (right)

==== Host response ====
Responses to parasitic eggs and chicks in the nest vary among hosts. Sometimes even within a host species, the response to parasitism is context-dependent. For example, when grayish baywings were acting as host parents to shiny cowbird young, cowbirds would only continue to receive parental care after they fledged if they had been raised alone in the nest without any baywing nest mates. Yellow warblers have been recorded to reject shiny cowbird eggs around 40% of the time, either by deserting their nest or building a new nest on top of the parasitised one. In hosts such as the creamy-bellied thrush, where parasitism by shiny cowbirds does not have a large negative effect on the survival of their own chicks, the hosts do not exhibit egg-ejection behaviour. This acceptance of parasitic eggs may also be due to the fact that the eggs are similar in appearance, and the host would risk harming its own eggs in the process.

===== Effect on host species =====
Fed by masked water tyrant in Brazil

Brood parasitism from shiny cowbirds will have a negative effect on the reproductive success of their hosts through a variety of factors employed by the different life stages of the cowbird. Adult females can negatively affect the host by pecking and killing host eggs and removing the host eggs from the nest. Shiny cowbird eggs have a short incubation period of about 10–11 days. Many of the parasite's hosts have eggs that incubate for longer. One of their main hosts across much of South America, the rufous-collared sparrow, has an incubation period of 12–13 days. The shiny cowbird will sometimes also lay an egg before the host species begins laying. Laying their eggs before their host, as well as having a shorter incubation period, allows for the hatching of the parasitic chick to occur before the host eggs hatch. When the cowbirds hatch before the sparrows in the nest, sparrows usually do not gain much weight and die within about three days. In one study, nestling mortality almost doubled when comparing a non-parasitised nest to one that had been parasitised by a shiny cowbird.

Shiny cowbirds can have a large negative effect on critically endangered species, such as the pale-headed brush finch. Human modification of their restricted geographic range led to habitat loss in the case of the finches but also introduced more cowbirds into the now open area. Parasitism by shiny cowbirds is thought to be an important factor in the population decline of the pale-headed brush finch.
