= Brood parasitism =

Animal reliance on other individuals to raise its young

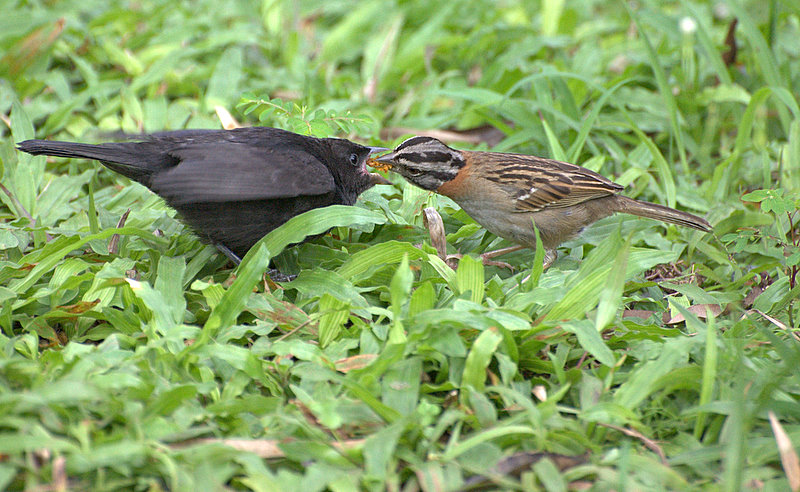
A shiny cowbird chick (left) being fed by a rufous-collared sparrow

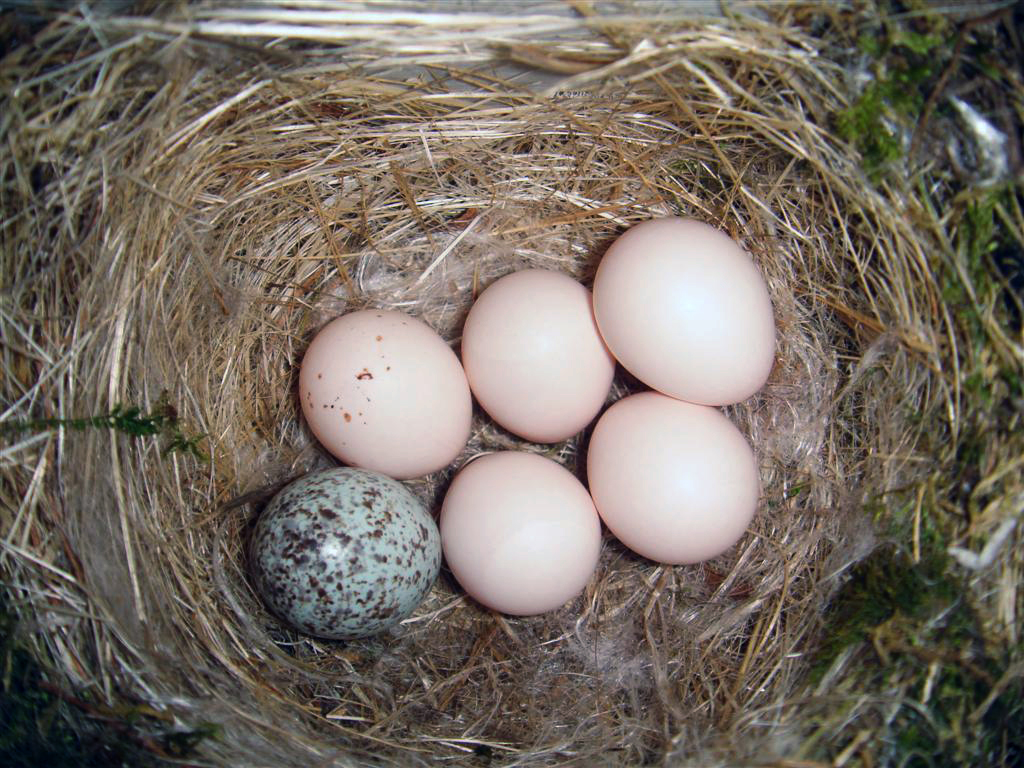
Eastern phoebe nest with one brown-headed cowbird egg (at bottom left)

Shiny cowbird parasitizing masked water tyrant in Brazil

Brood parasitism is a subclass of parasitism and phenomenon and behavioural pattern of animals that rely on others to raise their young. The strategy appears among birds, insects and fish. The brood parasite manipulates a host, either of the same or of another species, to raise its young as if it were its own, usually using egg mimicry, with eggs that resemble the host's. The strategy involves a form of aggressive mimicry called Kirbyan mimicry.

The evolutionary strategy relieves the parasitic parents from the investment of rearing young. This benefit comes at the cost of provoking an evolutionary arms race between parasite and host as they coevolve: many hosts have developed strong defenses against brood parasitism, such as recognizing and ejecting parasitic eggs, or abandoning parasitized nests and starting over. It is less obvious why most hosts do care for parasite nestlings, given that for example cuckoo chicks differ markedly from host chicks in size and appearance. One explanation, the mafia hypothesis, proposes that parasitic adults retaliate by destroying host nests where rejection has occurred; there is experimental evidence to support this. Intraspecific brood parasitism also occurs, as in many duck species.

== Evolutionary strategy ==
Brood parasitism is an evolutionary strategy that relieves the parasitic parents from the investment of rearing young or building nests for the young by getting the host to raise their young for them. This enables the parasitic parents to spend more time on other activities such as foraging and producing further offspring.

=== Adaptations for parasitism ===
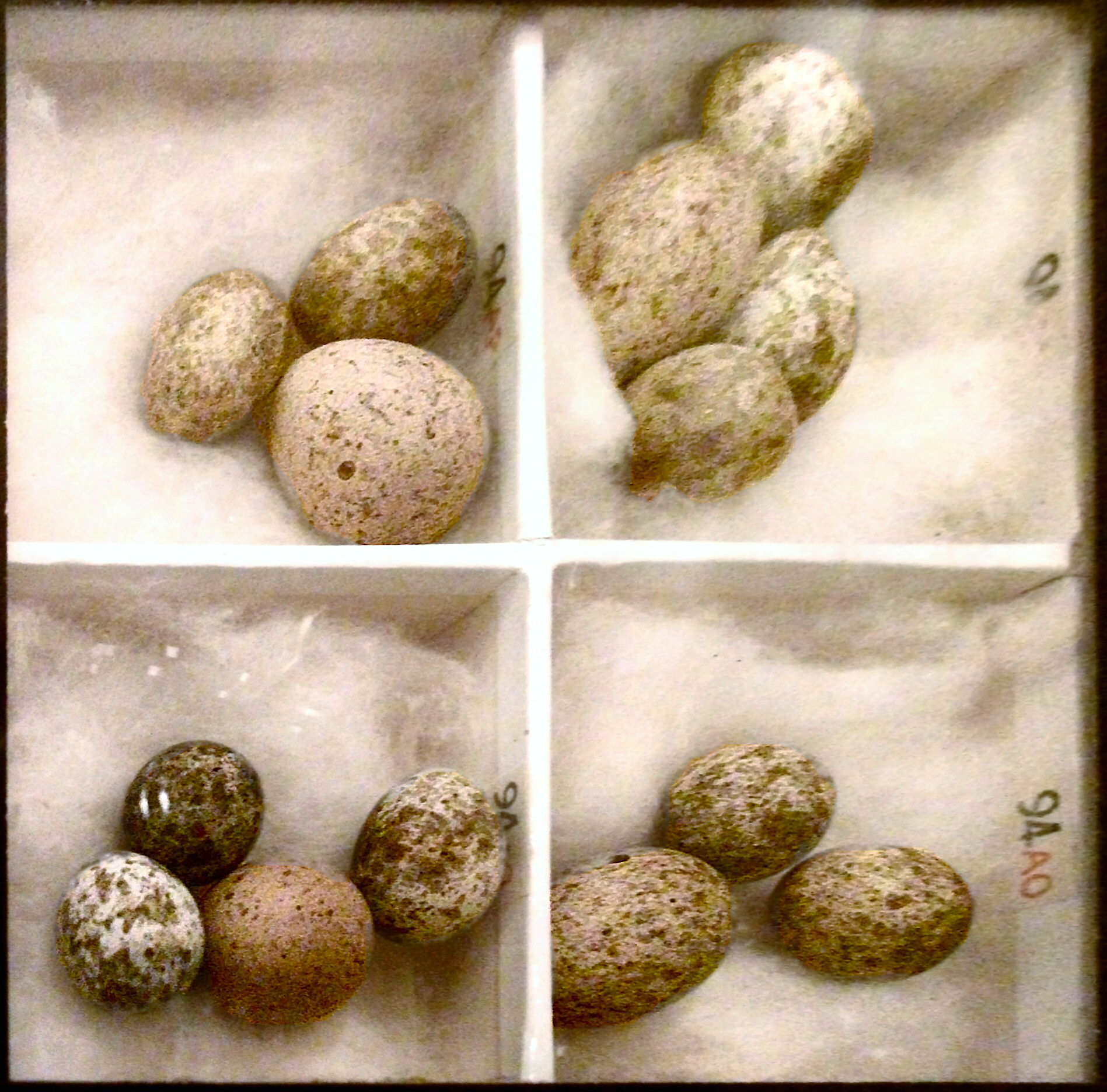
Four clutches of reed warbler eggs, each containing one visibly larger cuckoo egg

Among specialist avian brood parasites, mimetic eggs are a nearly universal adaptation. The generalist brown-headed cowbird may have evolved an egg coloration mimicking a number of their hosts. Size may also be important for the incubation and survival of parasitic species; it may be beneficial for parasitic eggs to be similar in size to the eggs of the host species.

The eggshells of brood parasites are often thicker than those of the hosts. For example, two studies of cuckoos parasiting great reed warblers reported thickness ratios of 1.02 : 0.87 and 1.04 : 0.81. The function of this thick eggshell is debated. One hypothesis, the puncture resistance hypothesis, states that the thicker eggshells serve to prevent hosts from breaking the eggshell, thus killing the embryo inside. This is supported by a study in which marsh warblers damaged their own eggs more often when attempting to break cuckoo eggs, but incurred less damage when trying to puncture great reed warbler eggs put in the nest by researchers. Another hypothesis is the laying damage hypothesis, which postulates that the eggshells are adapted to damage the eggs of the host when the former is being laid, and prevent the parasite's eggs from being damaged when the host lays its eggs. In support of this hypothesis, eggs of the shiny cowbird parasitizing the house wren and the chalk-browed mockingbird and the brown-headed cowbird parasitizing the house wren and the red-winged blackbird damaged the host's eggs when dropped, and sustained little damage when host eggs were dropped on them.

Most avian brood parasites have very short egg incubation periods and rapid nestling growth. In many brood parasites, such as cuckoos and honeyguides, this short egg incubation period is due to internal incubation periods up to 24 hours longer in cuckoos than hosts. Some non-parasitic cuckoos also have longer internal incubation periods, suggesting that this longer internal incubation period was not an adaptation following brood parasitism, but predisposed birds to become brood parasites. This is likely facilitated by a heavier yolk in the egg providing more nutrients. Being larger than the hosts on hatching is a further adaptation to being a brood parasite.

=== Evolutionary arms race ===
Bird parasites mitigate the risk of egg loss by distributing eggs amongst a number of different hosts. As such behaviours damage the host, they often result in an evolutionary arms race between parasite and host as they coevolve. Some host species have strong rejection defenses, forcing the parasitic species to evolve excellent mimicry. In other species, hosts do not defend against parasites, and the parasitic mimicry is poor.

Kirbyan mimicry, in which a brood parasite mimics its host

Intraspecific brood parasitism among coots significantly increases the reproductive fitness of the parasite, but only about half of the eggs laid parasitically in other coot nests survive. This implies that coots have somewhat effective anti-parasitism strategies. Similarly, the parasitic offspring of bearded reedlings, compared to offspring in non-parasitic nests, tend to develop much more slowly and often do not reach full maturity.

Given that the cost to the host of egg removal by the parasite is unrecoverable, the best strategy for hosts is to avoid parasitism in the first place. This can take several forms, including selecting nest sites which are difficult to parasitize, starting incubation early so they are already sitting on the nests when parasites visit them early in the morning, and aggressively defending their territory.

Once a parasitic egg has arrived in a host's nest, the next most optimal defense is to eject the parasitic egg. This requires the host to distinguish which eggs are not theirs, by identifying pattern differences or changes in the number of eggs. Eggs may be ejected by grasping, if the host has a large enough beak, or by puncturing. When the parasitic eggs are mimetic, hosts may mistake one of their own eggs for a parasite's. A host might also damage its own eggs while trying to eject a parasite's egg. There is some evidence that nests in more shaded territories may be more vulnerable to intraspecific brood parasitism, with the shadows potentially hindering hosts' ability to recognise and reject parasitic eggs, as well as providing concealment for egg-dumping females.

Among hosts that do not eject parasitic eggs, some abandon parasitized nests and start over again. However, at high enough parasitism frequencies, this becomes maladaptive as the new nest will most likely also be parasitized. Some host species modify their nests to exclude the parasitic egg, either by weaving over the egg or by rebuilding a new nest over the existing one. For instance, American coots may kick the parasites' eggs out, or build a new nest beside the brood nests where the parasites' chicks starve to death. In the western Bonelli's warbler, a small host, small dummy parasitic eggs were always ejected, whilst with large dummy parasitic eggs, nest desertion was more frequent.

=== Mafia hypothesis ===
There is a question as to why the majority of the hosts of brood parasites care for the nestlings of their parasites. Not only do these brood parasites usually differ significantly in size and appearance, but it is also highly probable that they reduce the reproductive success of their hosts. The "mafia hypothesis" proposes that when a brood parasite discovers that its egg has been rejected, it destroys the host's nest and injures or kills the nestlings. The threat of such a response may encourage compliant behavior from the host. Mafia-like behavior occurs in the brown-headed cowbird of North America, and the great spotted cuckoo of Europe. The great spotted cuckoo lays most of its eggs in the nests of the European magpie. It repeatedly visits nests it has parasitised, a precondition for the mafia hypothesis. In experiments, nests from which the parasite's egg has been removed are destroyed by the cuckoo, supporting the hypothesis. An alternative explanation is that the destruction encourages the magpie host to build a new nest, giving the cuckoo another opportunity for parasitism. Similarly, the brown-headed cowbird parasitises the prothonotary warbler. In other experiments, 56% of egg-ejected nests were predated upon, against 6% of non-ejected nests. 85% of parasitized nests rebuilt by hosts were destroyed. Hosts that ejected parasite eggs produced 60% fewer young than those that accepted the cowbird eggs.

=== Similarity hypothesis ===
Common cuckoo females have been proposed to select hosts with similar egg characteristics to her own. The hypothesis suggests that the female monitors a population of potential hosts and chooses nests from within this group. Study of museum nest collections shows a similarity between cuckoo eggs and typical eggs of the host species. A low percentage of parasitized nests were shown to contain cuckoo eggs not corresponding to the specific host egg morph. In these mismatched nests a high percent of the cuckoo eggs were shown to correlate to the egg morph of another host species with similar nesting sites. This has been pointed to as evidence for selection by similarity. The hypothesis has been criticised for providing no mechanism for choosing nests, nor identifying cues by which they might be recognised.

=== Hosts raise offspring ===
Sometimes hosts are completely unaware that they are caring for a bird that is not their own. This most commonly occurs because the host cannot differentiate the parasitic eggs from their own. It may also occur when hosts temporarily leave the nest after laying the eggs. The parasites lay their own eggs into these nests so their nestlings share the food provided by the host. It may occur in other situations. For example, female eiders prefer to lay eggs in the nests with one or two existing eggs of others because the first egg is the most vulnerable to predators. The presence of others' eggs reduces the probability that a predator will attack her egg when a female leaves the nest after laying the first egg.

Sometimes, the parasitic offspring kills the host nest-mates during competition for resources. For example, parasitic cowbird chicks kill the host nest-mates if food intake for each of them is low, but not if the food intake is adequate.

== Taxonomic range ==
=== Birds ===
==== Intraspecific ====
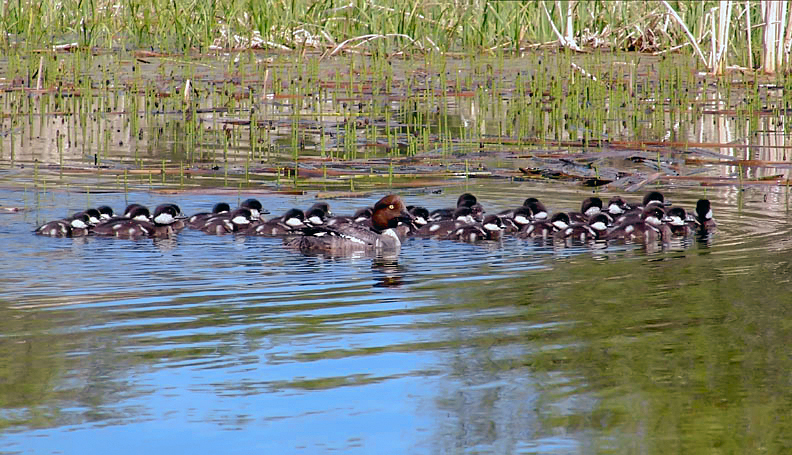
The goldeneye often lays its eggs in the nests of other females, one of 74 species of Anseriformes to do so.

In many socially monogamous bird species, there are extra-pair matings resulting in males outside the pair bond siring offspring and used by males to escape from the parental investment in raising their offspring. In duck species such as the goldeneye, this form of cuckoldry is taken a step further, as females often lay their eggs in the nests of other individuals. Intraspecific brood parasitism has been recorded in 234 bird species, including 74 anseriformes, 66 passeriformes, 32 galliformes, 19 charadriiformes, 8 gruiformes, 6 podicipediformes, and small numbers of species in other orders.

=== Quasiparasitism ===
Quasiparasitism is a subtype of intraspecific brood parasitism in which the female parent escapes parental investment, but the offspring is still raised by its biological father. A female mates with a male, then deposits the egg in the nest of another female that is attended by that same male. This behavior was first hypothesized by Marion Petrie during her work with common moorhens, while the term quasi-parasitism was coined by Peter Wrege and Stephen Emlen to describe behavior they observed in white-fronted bee-eaters; however, since confirming quasiparasitism requires both extensive behavioral observations and genetic data, it is often difficult to confirm whether a given offspring is the result of quasiparasitic behavior.

==== Interspecific ====
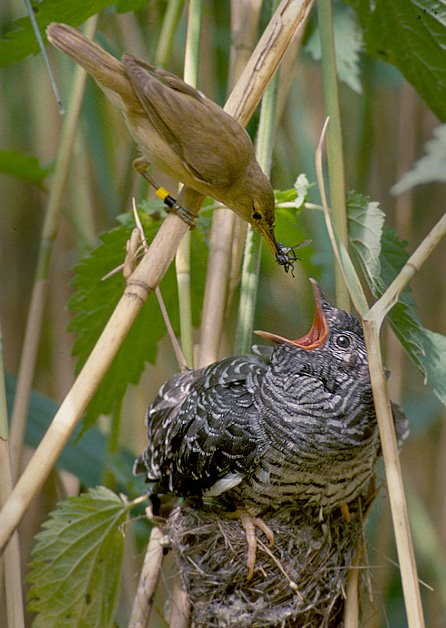
A Eurasian reed warbler raising a common cuckoo

Interspecific brood-parasites include the indigobirds, whydahs, and honeyguides in Africa, cowbirds, Old World cuckoos, black-headed ducks, and some New World cuckoos in the Americas. Seven independent origins of obligate interspecific brood parasitism in birds have been proposed. While there is still some controversy over when and how many origins of interspecific brood parasitism have occurred, recent phylogenetic analyses suggest two origins in Passeriformes (once in New World cowbirds: Icteridae, and once in African Finches: Viduidae); three origins in Old World and New World cuckoos (once in Cuculinae, Phaenicophaeinae, and in Neomorphinae-Crotophaginae); a single origin in Old World honeyguides (Indicatoridae); and in a single species of waterfowl, the black-headed duck (Heteronetta atricapilla).

Most avian brood parasites are specialists which parasitize only a single host species or a small group of closely related host species, but four out of the five parasitic cowbirds (all except the screaming cowbird) are generalists which parasitize a wide variety of hosts; the brown-headed cowbird has 221 known hosts. They usually lay only one egg per nest, although in some cases, particularly the cowbirds, several females may use the same host nest.

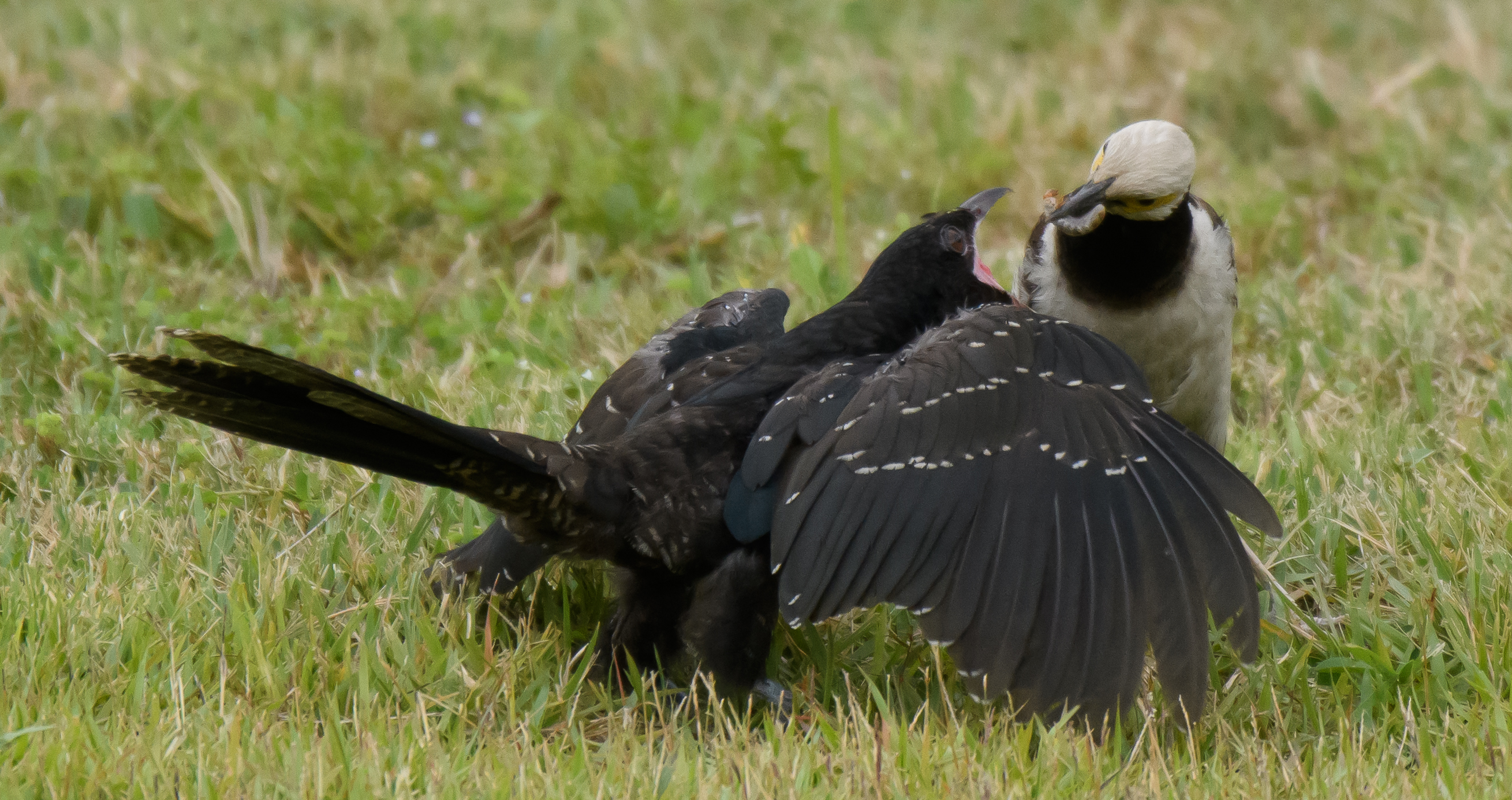
A black-collared starling feeding an Asian koel

The common cuckoo presents an interesting case in which the species as a whole parasitizes a wide variety of hosts, including the reed warbler and dunnock, but individual females specialize in a single species. Genes regulating egg coloration appear to be passed down exclusively along the maternal line, allowing females to lay mimetic eggs in the nest of the species they specialize in. Females generally parasitize nests of the species which raised them. Male common cuckoos fertilize females of all lines, which maintains sufficient gene flow among the different maternal lines to prevent speciation.

The mechanisms of host selection by female cuckoos are somewhat unclear, though several hypotheses have been suggested in attempt to explain the choice. These include genetic inheritance of host preference, host imprinting on young birds, returning to place of birth and subsequently choosing a host randomly ("natal philopatry"), choice based on preferred nest site (nest-site hypothesis), and choice based on preferred habitat (habitat-selection hypothesis). Of these hypotheses the nest-site selection and habitat selection have been most supported by experimental analysis.

=== Fish ===
==== Mouthbrooding parasites ====
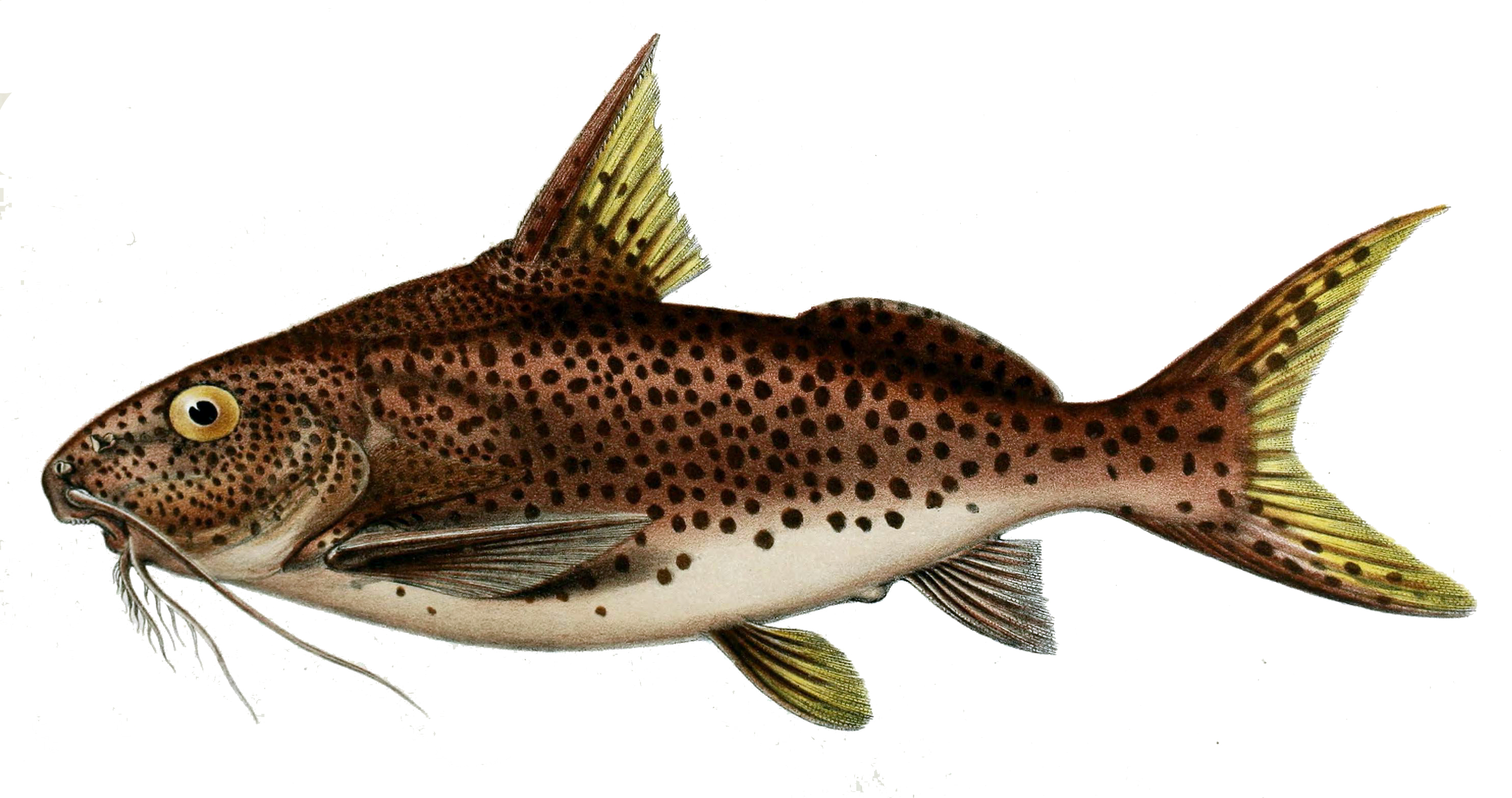
The catfish Synodontis multipunctatus is a brood parasite of several mouthbrooding cichlid fish.

A mochokid catfish of Lake Tanganyika, Synodontis multipunctatus, is a brood parasite of several mouthbrooding cichlid fish. The catfish eggs are incubated in the host's mouth, and—in the manner of cuckoos—hatch before the host's own eggs. The young catfish eat the host fry inside the host's mouth, effectively taking up virtually the whole of the host's parental investment.

==== Nest parasites ====
A cyprinid minnow, Pungtungia herzi is a brood parasite of the percichthyid freshwater perch Siniperca kawamebari, which live in the south of the Japanese islands of Honshu, Kyushu and Shikoku, and in South Korea. Host males guard territories against intruders during the breeding season, creating a patch of reeds as a spawning site or "nest". Females (one or more per site) visit the site to lay eggs, which the male then defends. The parasite's eggs are smaller and stickier than the host's. 65.5% of host sites were parasitised in a study area.

=== Insects ===
==== Kleptoparasites ====
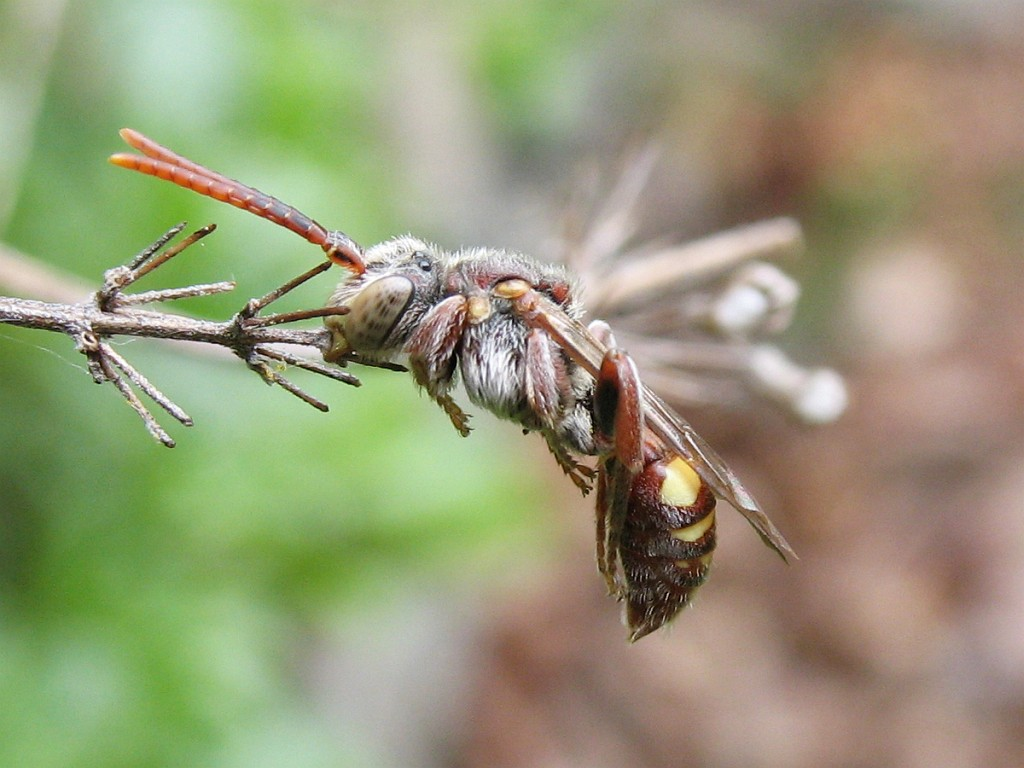
A cuckoo bee from the genus Nomada

There are many different types of cuckoo bees, all of which lay their eggs in the nest cells of other bees, but they are normally described as kleptoparasites (Greek: klepto-, to steal), rather than as brood parasites, because the immature stages are almost never fed directly by the adult hosts. Instead, they simply take food gathered by their hosts. Examples of cuckoo bees are Coelioxys rufitarsis, Melecta separata, Nomada and Epeoloides.

Kleptoparasitism in insects is not restricted to bees; several lineages of wasp including most of the Chrysididae, the cuckoo wasps, are kleptoparasites. The cuckoo wasps lay their eggs in the nests of other wasps, such as those of the potters and mud daubers. Some species of beetle are kleptoparasites, as well. Meloe americanus larvae are known to enter bee nests and feed on the provisions reserved for the bee larva.

==== True brood parasites ====
True brood parasitism is rare among insects. Cuckoo bumblebees (the subgenus Psithyrus) are among the few insects which, like cuckoos and cowbirds, are fed by adult hosts. Their queens kill and replace the existing queen of a colony of the host species, and then use the host workers to feed their brood.

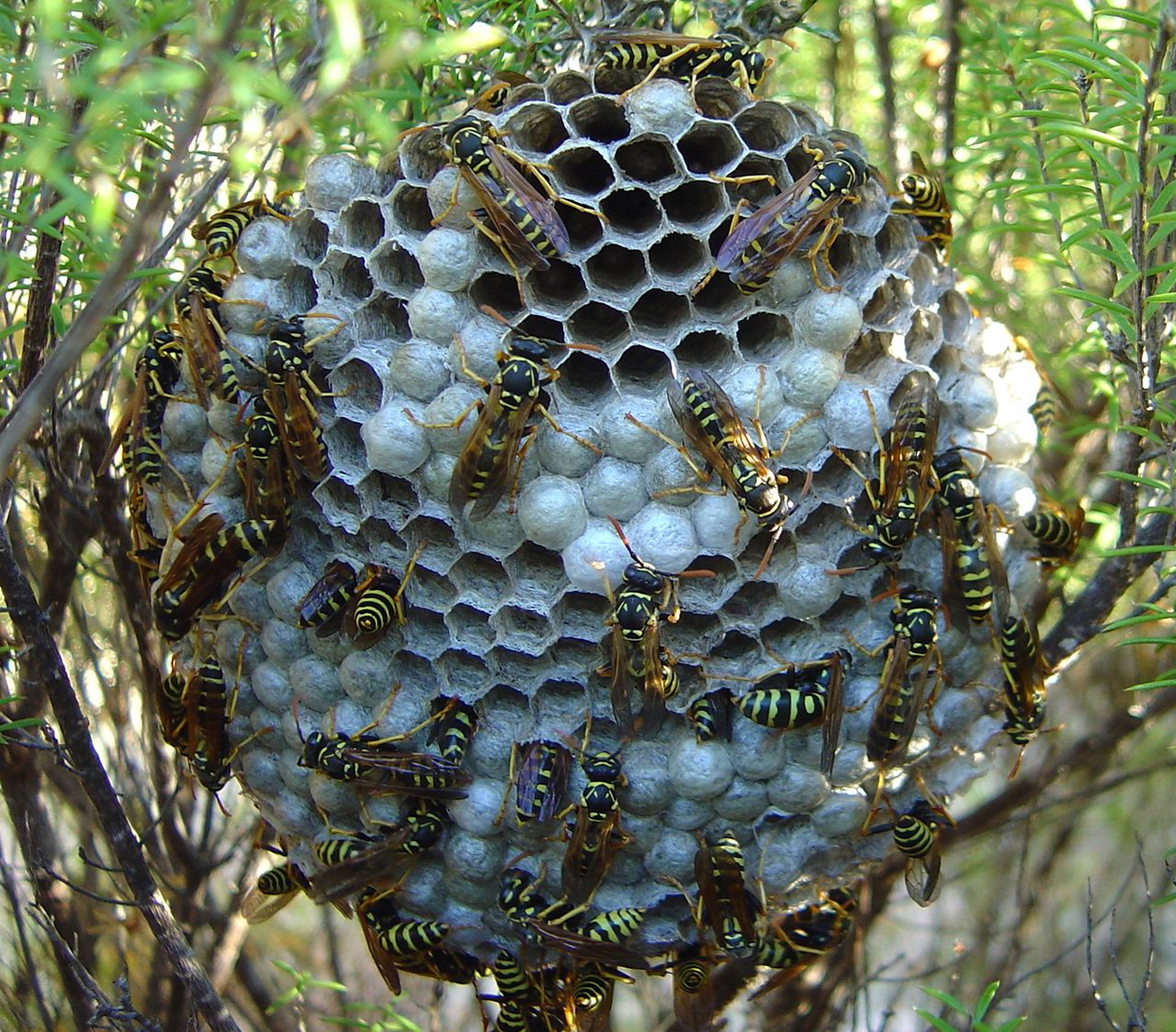
Nest of Polistes dominula, host to the cuckoo wasp P. semenowi (Note: Polistes semenowi was mistakenly named Polistes sulcifer until 2017. This note has been included for continuity relative to pre-2017 citations used in this article.)

One of only four true brood-parasitic wasps is Polistes semenowi. This paper wasp has lost the ability to build its own nest, and relies on its host, P. dominula, to raise its brood. The adult host feeds the parasite larvae directly, unlike typical kleptoparasitic insects. Such insect social parasites are often closely related to their hosts, an observation known as Emery's rule.

Host insects are sometimes tricked into bringing offspring of another species into their own nests, as with the parasitic butterfly, Phengaris rebeli, and the host ant Myrmica schencki. The butterfly larvae release chemicals that confuse the host ant into believing that the P. rebeli larvae are actually ant larvae. Thus, the M. schencki ants bring back the P. rebeli larvae to their nests and feed them, much like the chicks of cuckoos and other brood-parasitic birds. This is also the case for the parasitic butterfly, Niphanda fusca, and its host ant Camponotus japonicus. The butterfly releases cuticular hydrocarbons that mimic those of the host male ant. The ant then brings the third instar larvae back into its own nest and raises them until pupation.

== See also ==
- Broodiness
- Aggressive mimicry – including host-parasite mimicry
- Kleptoparasite
- Slave-making ant
