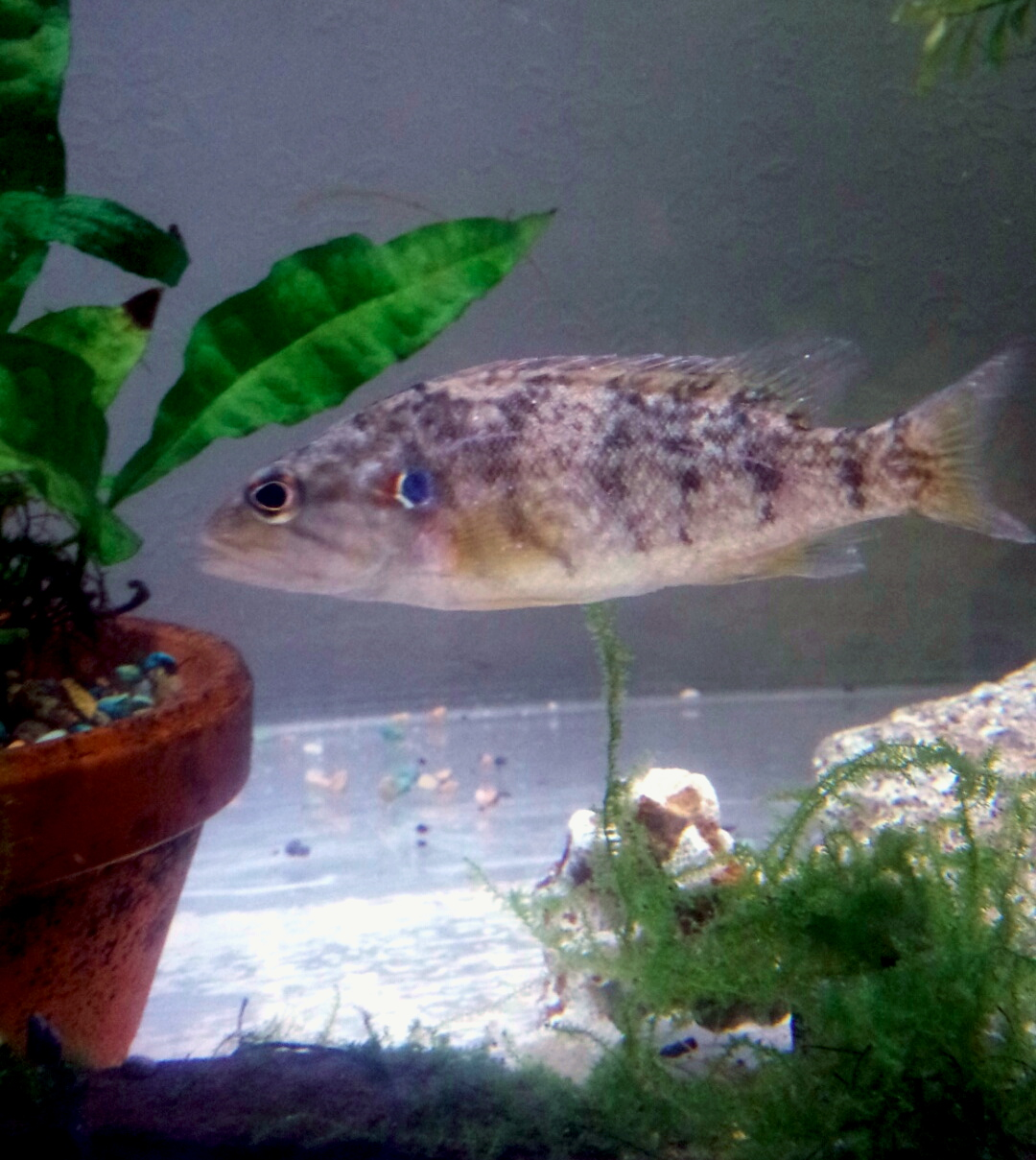

Scientific classification
- Domain: Eukaryota
- Kingdom: Animalia
- Phylum: Chordata
- Class: Actinopterygii
- Order: Centrarchiformes
- Family: Sinipercidae
- Genus: Coreoperca
- Species: C. herzi

Binomial name
- Coreoperca herzi Herzenstein, 1896

= Coreoperca herzi =

Species of fish

Coreoperca herzi is a species of Coreoperca native only in the fresh waters of South Korea. It usually habits in the upper reaches of rivers, which contain much water and gravel.

== Genus ==
The members of the genus Coreoperca are known as the oriental perches or eastern perches, freshwater gamefish belonging to the family Percichthyidae. These fish prefer clear, slow-moving currents on the middle reaches of rivers. Eggs are laid in May and June on plants. The eggs and fry are protected by the male.

== Etymology ==
The word "Coreoperca" is based in Greek roots. The prefix kore(, -es) stands for pupil or maid, and suffix perke stands for the perch family.

The fish has a common name in Korean: 꺽지, romanized: ggeokji. According to a legend from the county of Cheolwon (Gangwon-do), during the Joseon Dynasty there was an infamous thief named Im Geojeong (Korean: 임거정), who wore leopard-spotted clothes when he robbed people. Im was chased by the government army and dived into the river to escape. There he became a fish with a spotted pattern on its scales. Im's given name Geojeong became reshaped to ggeokji, the name of the fish .

== Biology ==
The species Coreoperca Herzi is found only in South Korean fresh waters, mostly in the rivers. The species is very common, so they exist in almost every rivers in Korea. At first, the species did not live on the eastern side of the Paektu Mountains, only on the western side. However, the species were moved artificially in order to flourish also in the waters of west Korea. It can be considered as invasive species in introduced areas, especially in Ōyodo River system in Japan where native species such as Pseudogobio esocinus are threatened by this species. They usually habit between the rocks and pebbles which they can breed on.

=== Physical characteristics ===
The fish's body is flat to the side, and is high vertically, which is pyramid-shaped. Its body length is from 15 to 20 centimeters(6~8 inches). It has a relatively bigger head compared to its body, and has eyes on the top of its head. Its mouth is big and sharp at the end, and its upper chin is slightly longer than the lower one. The fins on the back has a long, round end, and the tail has a round edge.

It has a greenish-brown background color, and it becomes darker from the abdomen to its tail. It has black dotted stripes throughout the whole body, and the other parts are covered with white dots. Also, it has a sharp, turquoise pattern on the back end of the operculum of its gills. Its color and the brightness changes by the environment, mood and the surrounding light. The shape is similar to a leopard mandarin fish, so people in Korea also call it as a 'mini mandarin fish'.

=== Behaviour ===
==== Feeding behaviour ====
Coreoperca Herzi is carnivorous. It feeds on crustaceans, little fish, and aquatic insects.

==== Sexual behaviour ====
It spawns in early summer, in May or June. The appropriate temperature of its mating is 18~28 degrees Celsius. The female species lays and attaches the eggs under a rock, and the male species come and fertilizes it. (External fertilization) After a couple of weeks, and around 20 degrees Celsius, the eggs start to hatch. Like the stickleback fish, the male species protects the eggs from other creatures and supplies oxygen to the unhatched eggs by fanning its fins. It also takes care of the offspring until it grows to a certain size. Before it hatches, some fish such as the striped shinner also lay eggs on the original eggs. However, it does not harm the original eggs and the offspring.

== Specific habitats ==
=== Regions ===
Goseong, Changjin, Cheorwon, Yangju, Yeoju, Chuncheon, Yanggu, Hwacheon, Inje, Pyeonchang, Jungsun, Muju, Jinan, Jeonju, Wanju, Jangsung, Seungju, Suncheon, Miryang, Andong, Bonghwa, Yeongok, Munsan, Paldang, Sancheong, Jinju
