= Squirrelfish (disambiguation) =

Squirrelfish may refer to:

- Squirrelfish or Holocentridae, a family of ray-finned fish
- SquirrelFish, a JavaScript engine being developed by the Webkit project
- Squirrel fish, a dish in Chinese cuisine
