= Carolina pygmy sunfish =

Conservation status
- Vulnerable (IUCN 3.1)

Scientific classification
- Kingdom: Animalia
- Phylum: Chordata
- Class: Actinopterygii
- Order: Centrarchiformes
- Family: Elassomatidae
- Genus: Elassoma
- Species: E. boehlkei

Binomial name
- Elassoma boehlkei Rohde & R. G. Arndt, 1987

Species of ray-finned fish

The Carolina pygmy sunfish, Elassoma boehlkei, is a species of pygmy sunfish endemic to the United States, where it is only known from the Waccamaw and Santee River drainages in the Carolinas. This species prefers waters with dense vegetation. It can reach 3.3 cm (1.3 in) in total length, though most do not exceed 2 cm (0.79 in). This species can also be found in the aquarium trade.
