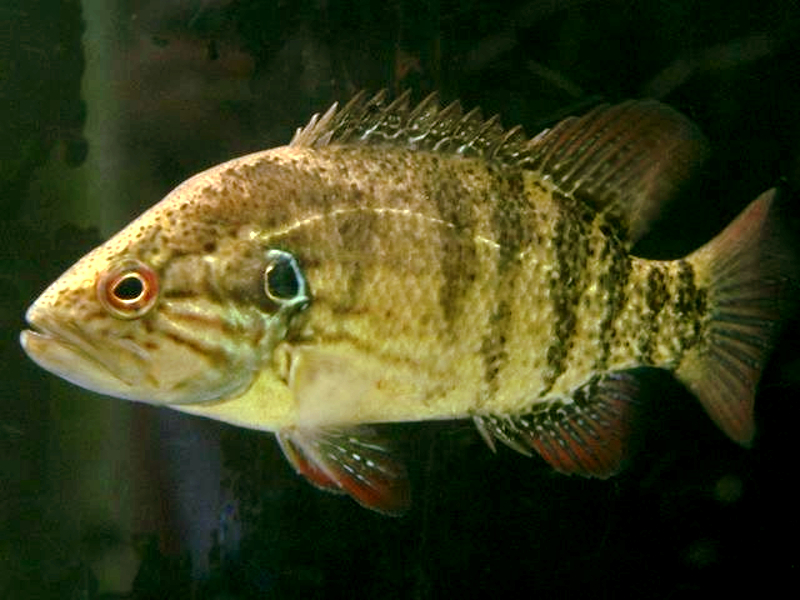

Conservation status
- Least Concern (IUCN 3.1)

Scientific classification
- Kingdom: Animalia
- Phylum: Chordata
- Class: Actinopterygii
- Division: Teleostei
- Order: Centrarchiformes
- Family: Sinipercidae
- Genus: Coreoperca
- Species: C. kawamebari

Binomial name
- Coreoperca kawamebari Temminck & Schlegel, 1843

Synonyms
- Siniperca kawamebari; Serranus kawamebari

= Coreoperca kawamebari =

Japanese perch

Species of ray-finned fish

Coreoperca kawamebari, commonly known as the Japanese perch, redfin perch, Japanese river perch, eye-spot perch, fire tiger or in Anglophone parts of Japan, simply the perch, is a predatory species of ray-finned fish native to Japan and southern Korea. They are sometimes kept as pets.

== Description ==
Japanese perch are greenish with red pelvic, anal and caudal fins. They have five to eight dark vertical bars on their sides. The Japanese perch can reach up to 15 cm (5.9 in) in length. They can live for up to 7 years.

== Diet ==
The Japanese perch is a predatory species. Juveniles feed on zooplankton, bottom invertebrate fauna, other fish fry, scuds, small shrimp and insects, while adults feed on both invertebrates and smaller fish, mainly Japanese rice fish, Japanese minnows (Nipponocypris temminckii, Rhynchocypris spp., Gnathopogon elongatus), Japanese smelt (Hypomesus nipponensis) fry, small crayfish and tadpoles. Japanese perch start eating other fish when they reach a size of around 6 cm (2.4 in).

== Reproduction ==
A Japanese perch usually matures in two to three years, but a Japanese perch that lives in warmer waters has the ability to reproduce in the first year of life. A single female has the potential to lay from 250 to 1,000 eggs annually. Japanese perch will journey to warmer shallow water for spawning. The primary spawning season for the Japanese perch occurs from the middle of April through approximately June, depositing their eggs on water plants or the branches of trees or shrubs immersed in the water.

== Predators ==
The Japanese perch is a frequent prey of many fish-eating predators, such as the great cormorant and common kingfisher.
