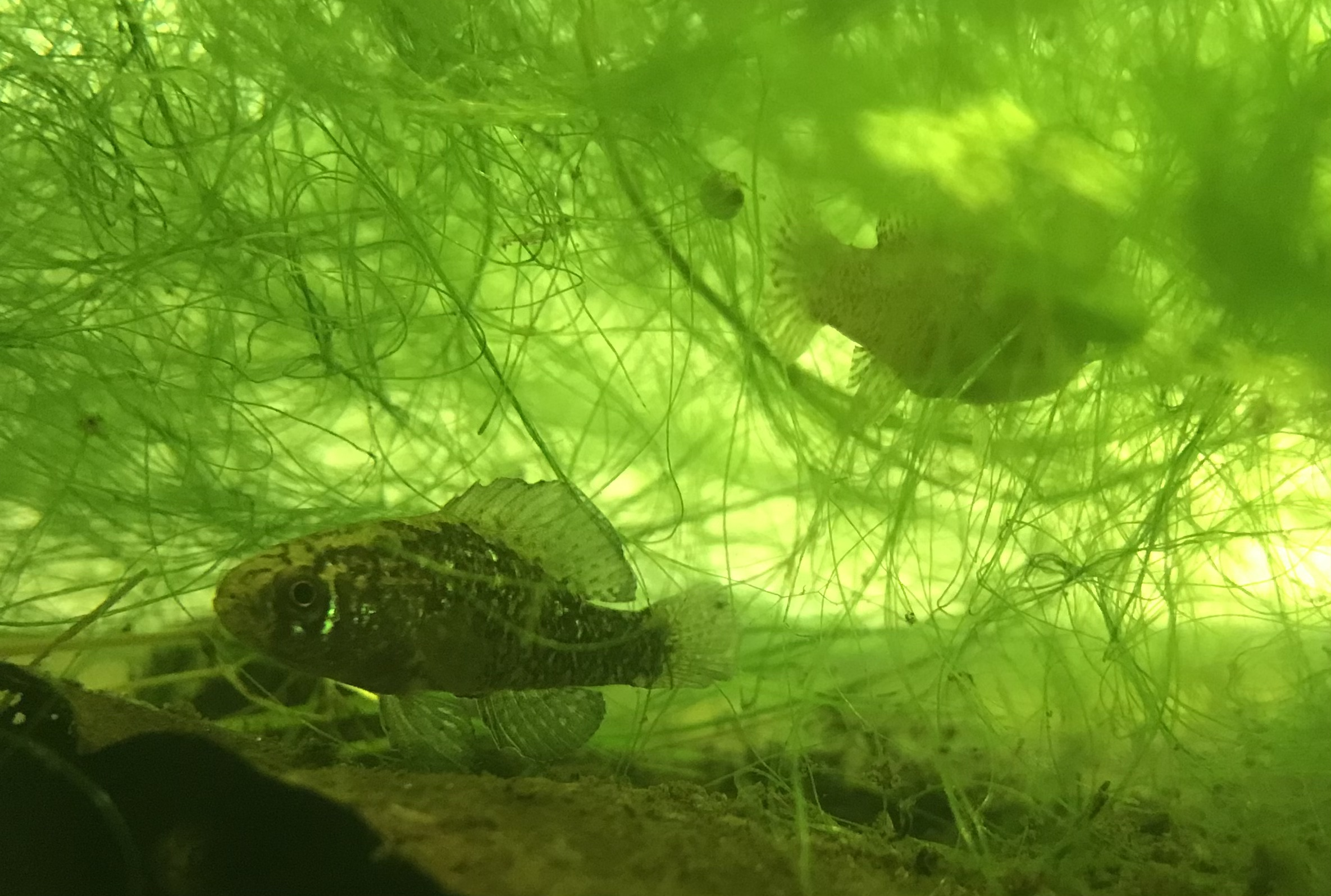
- Male (left) and female (right, obscured) Elassoma okatie in aquarium.

Conservation status
- Vulnerable (IUCN 3.1)

Scientific classification
- Kingdom: Animalia
- Phylum: Chordata
- Class: Actinopterygii
- Order: Centrarchiformes
- Family: Elassomatidae
- Genus: Elassoma
- Species: E. okatie

Binomial name
- Elassoma okatie Rohde & R. G. Arndt, 1987

= Bluebarred pygmy sunfish =

Species of ray-finned fish

The bluebarred pygmy sunfish, Elassoma okatie, is a species of pygmy sunfish endemic to South Carolina, United States. It prefers waters with dense vegetation growth in the Edisto and Savannah River drainages. This species can reach 3.4 cm (1.3 in) in total length.
