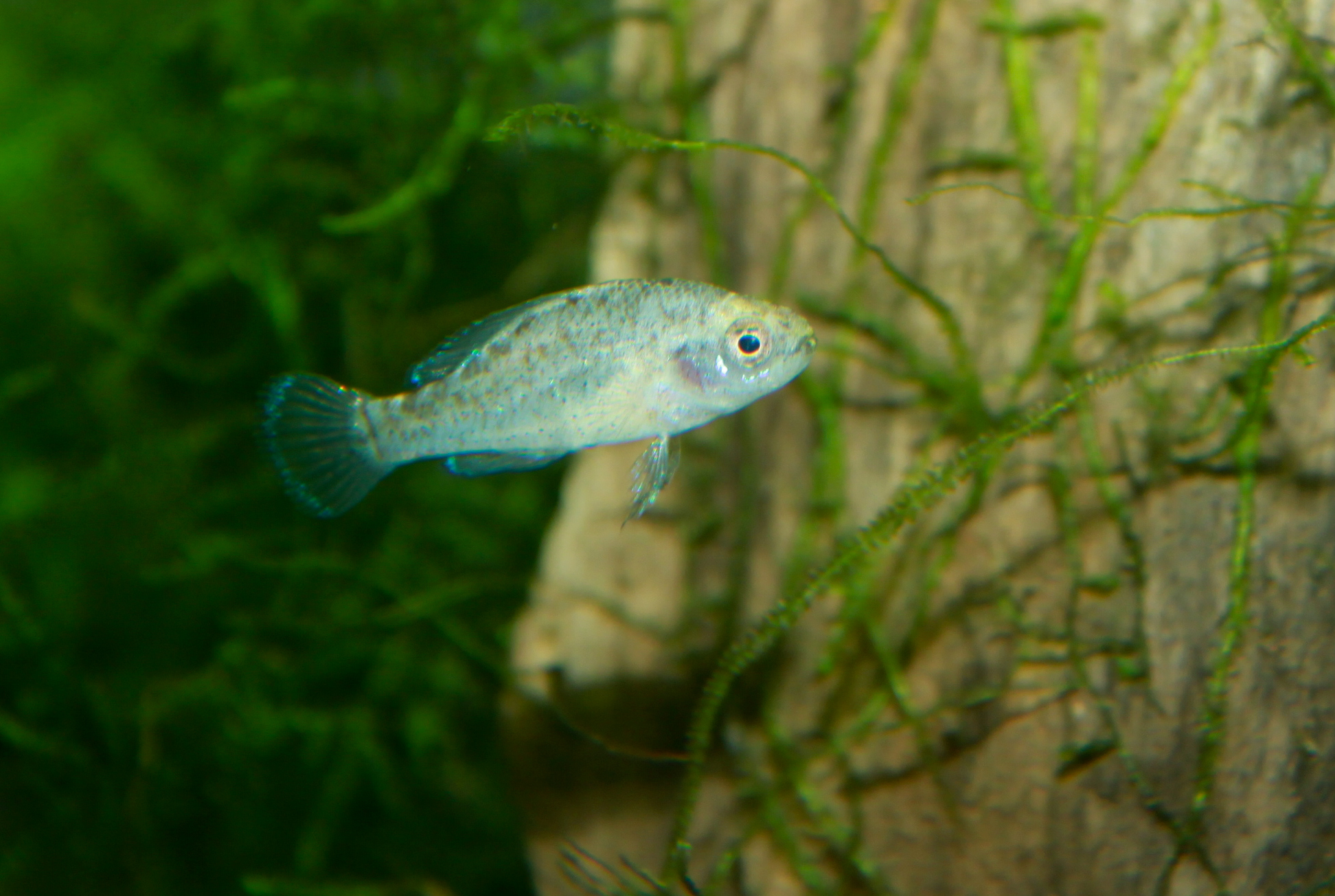

Conservation status
- Least Concern (IUCN 3.1)

Scientific classification
- Kingdom: Animalia
- Phylum: Chordata
- Class: Actinopterygii
- Order: Centrarchiformes
- Family: Elassomatidae
- Genus: Elassoma
- Species: E. evergladei

Binomial name
- Elassoma evergladei Jordan, 1884

= Elassoma evergladei =

Species of fish

Elassoma evergladei, or the Everglades pygmy sunfish, is a species of fish from the genus Elassoma (the pygmy sunfishes) that is endemic to North America.

== Description ==
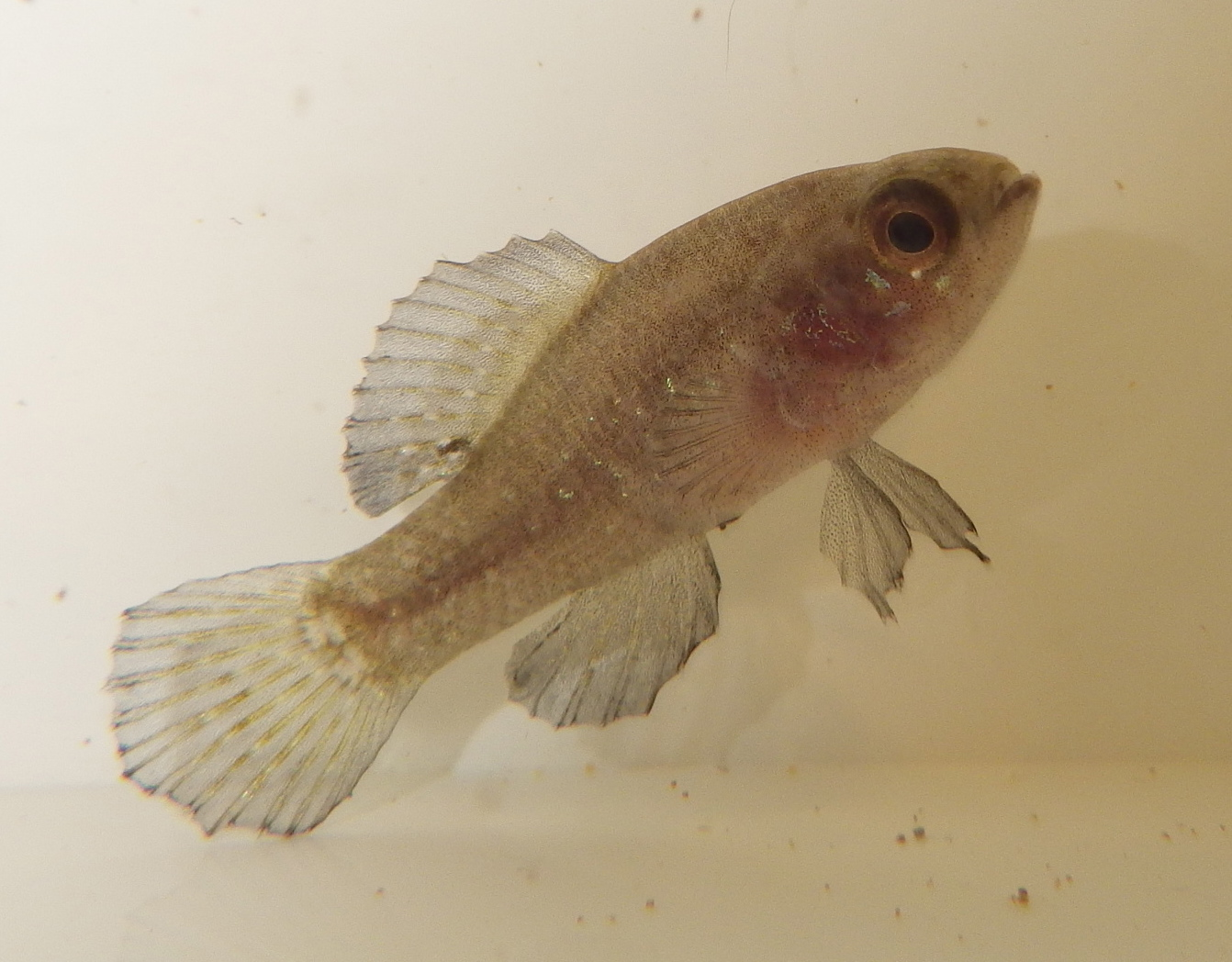
A male Everglades pygmy sunfish. The photographer notes that it "turned very pale in the photo box"

The fish can grow to a maximum length of 3.4 cm (in total length), and it generally grows to 2.3 cm (TL). Scales are present at the top of its head. Its mouth is both small and oblique. The fish does not have a lateral line. A crescent-shaped area behind each eye may be gold or iridescent blue. It has dark lips. Egg count in the ovaries of females in captivity ranged from 115 to 500, increasing with the fish's size.

The fish has variable color and form. Its body is generally colored brown with darker spots. The fish has several rows of dark red spots on its dorsal and anal fins. "Nonbreeding" fish may have light streaks, mottling, or blotches. Females of the species in general are colored brown on their backs with mottled brown and cream/white coloring underneath, or they may be reddish brown. The females have no markings. "Breeding" males are colored black with iridescent blue spots. Males have black fins with or without brown spots. Male bodies may be black, brown, or dark green with blotches or spots. A few indistinct dark bars may be present on the male body. Males may have brassy or blue-green iridescent scales scattered across their bodies.

According to one source, males are dark black and have iridescent blue flecks, and females have a brown coloration.

== Distribution and habitat ==
The Everyglades pygmy sunfish can be found in the United States from the end of Cape Fear River, North Carolina to Mobile Bay, Alabama. It may also be found from the south of Florida to the northern end of the Everglades. The fish has been found more often in the natural marshes rather than the constructed marshes of central Florida.

The fish lives in freshwater and demersal habitats at a pH range of 7.0 to 7.5 and a temperature range of 10 to 30 degrees Celsius. They reside in swamps, sphagnum bogs, sloughs with heavy vegetation, canals, overflow pools, ponds, lakes, and streams; generally over mud, silt, sand, limestone, or detritus. They exist in such areas where the current is slow and water levels fluctuate. They prefer shallow areas as well as areas of vegetation. The species tends to stay restricted to black water environments more than other species of the genus.

The species' population density is highly dependent on environmental conditions. However, the fish is considered common in most of its range and its overall population (estimated at 100,000 as of 2013) is large and stable.

== Behavior ==
The Everglades pygmy sunfish tends to live alone. As an invertivore, the fish preys on worms and other crustaceans in its habitat. Prey include cladocerans, dipteran larvae, annelids, chironomids, copepods, ostracods, and newly hatched snails. Where food is centrally located, males will establish territories with closer proximity to the center based on dominance. In environments of evenly distributed food, males will range freely and will not establish territories.

Like many other fish species, Elassoma evergladei is oviparous. A female may lay 40 to 60 eggs, and a male will guard the eggs. Eggs are laid in aquatic plants, especially in those from the genus Ceratophyllum.

=== In captivity ===
In captivity, males will establish their territory in feeding areas.

== Human significance ==
The fish is sold commercially for aquariums. One author considers it "the best-known member of the group [pygmy sunfishes] in the aquarium hobby."

In 2013, the IUCN Red List of Threatened Species named the species Least Concern because of its "large extent of occurrence, large number of subpopulations, large population size, apparently stable trend, and lack of major threats."

== Etymology, taxonomy, and history ==
Elassoma refers to the Greek words elasson, for "smaller", and soma, for "body". Evergladei means "of the Everglades", named for the location the type specimens were captured. David Starr Jordan first described the species in 1884, and his original specimens measured one inch in length. One 1918 publication mentioned the species' common name as the "southern pygmy sunfish".
