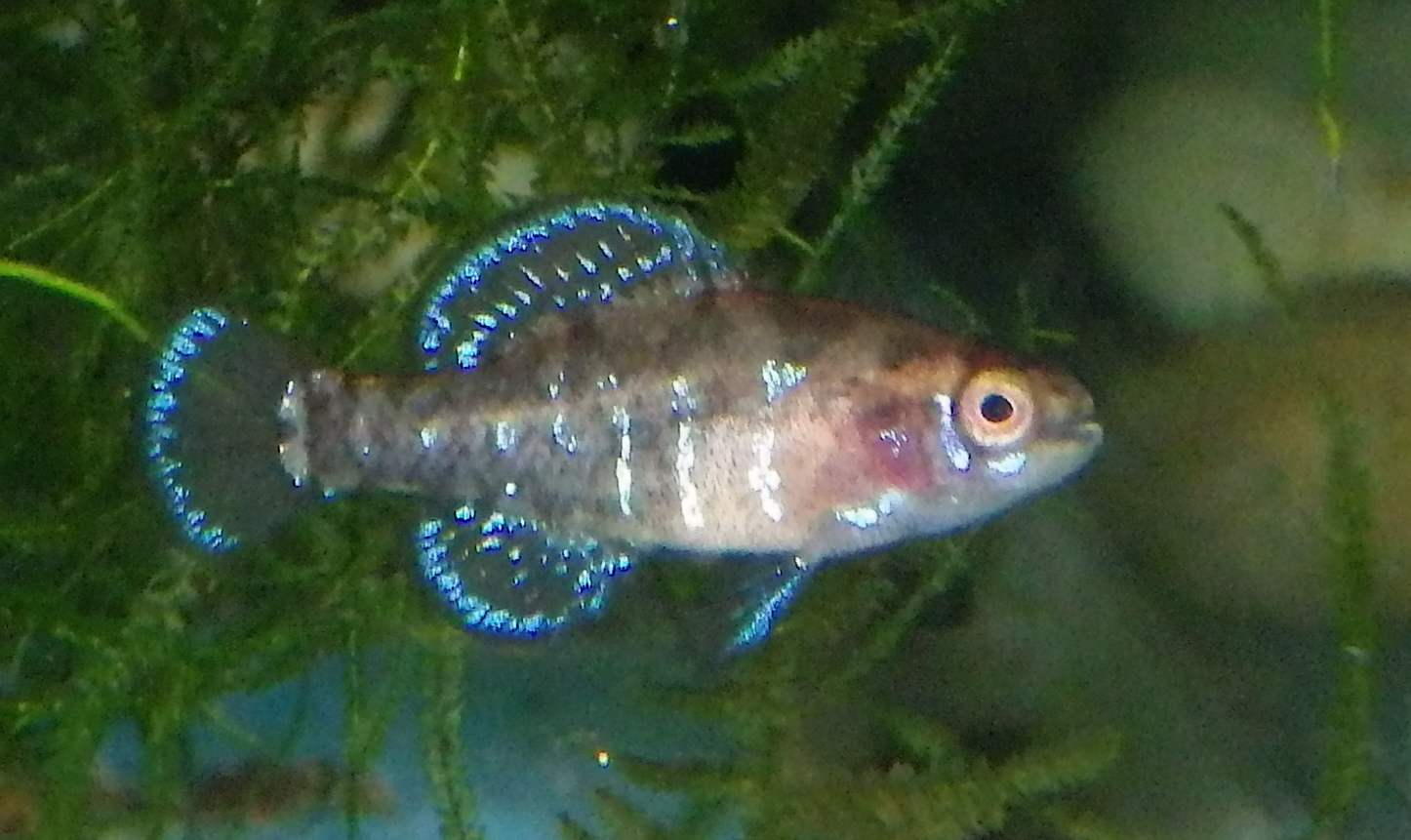

Conservation status
- Least Concern (IUCN 3.1)

Scientific classification
- Kingdom: Animalia
- Phylum: Chordata
- Class: Actinopterygii
- Order: Centrarchiformes
- Family: Elassomatidae
- Genus: Elassoma
- Species: E. okefenokee

Binomial name
- Elassoma okefenokee J. E. Böhlke, 1956

= Okefenokee pygmy sunfish =

Species of fish

The Okefenokee pygmy sunfish, Elassoma okefenokee, is a species of pygmy sunfish found in southeastern United States, where it prefers waters with dense vegetation growth in the Altamaha drainage in southern Georgia south to Lake Okeechobee, Florida, interior lake basins in north-central Florida, and upper Suwannee, Withlacoochee, and Hillsborough river drainages on the Gulf Coast of Florida. This species can reach 3.4 cm (1.3 in) in total length.

== Description ==
The Okefenokee pygmy sunfish is an olive green color fish with brownish-red mottling across the body, mixed with bright blue colors. Elassoma okefenokee differs from its close relative Elassoma gilberti by only having three preopercular canals (gilberti has, on average, four). The average number of anal fin rays is seven in E. gilberti whereas E. okefenokee has 8. The female E. gilberti often expresses a blue patch of color behind her eye and on her body, while the E. okefenokee does not.

== Diet ==
Some good foods to try in the aquarium are California blackworms, daphnia, Grindal worms, microworms, and having a healthy population of snails. Some pygmy sunfish will learn to supplement their diet with crushed flake food, but this should not be relied upon as the only food source. The crushed fish flakes are a good idea, though, because they will feed the microfauna that will in turn feed the Elassoma.

== Habitat ==
Elassoma okefenokee is a freshwater, demersal fish which spends its time in dense vegetation growth in waters with a pH range of 6.0-8.0 and a dH range of 5-unknown. Their preferred temperature range is 4–30 °C (39–86 °F).

== Reproduction and life cycle ==
The male turns black with blue sparkles while the females remains clear, tan, and light brown.

== Importance to humans ==
E. okefenokee are moderate-expert aquarium fish. They can breed in as little as 5 gallons of water and prefer a well planted aquarium.

== Etymology ==
Elassoma stems from the Greek, elasson (meaning smaller) plus the Greek, soma (meaning body) in reference to the fishes' diminutive size compared to the true sunfishes

== See also ==
- Elassomatidae
- List of fish families

== Sources ==
- Page, L. M.; Espinoza-Perez, H.; Findley, L. T.; Gilbert, C. R.; Lea, R. N.; Mandrak, N. E.; Mayden, R. L.; Nelson, J. S. (2013). Common and scientific names of the fishes from the United States, Canada, and Mexico. Bethesda Maryland: American Fisheries Society, Special Publication 34.
- Romero, P. (2002). An etymological dictionary of taxonomy. Madrid: Unpublished.
- "North American Native Fishtanks". The Native Tank.
