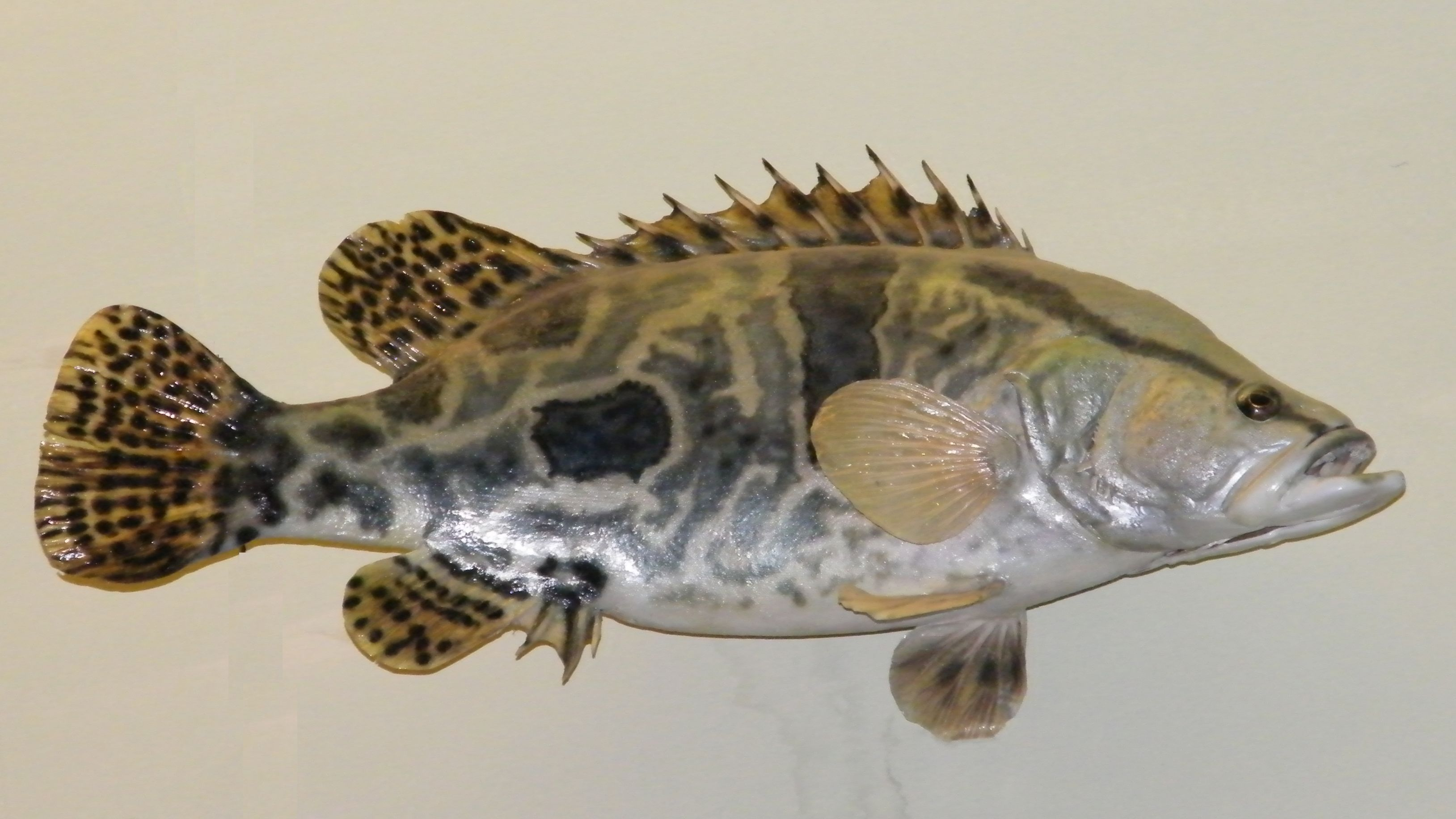
- Siniperca chuatsi

Scientific classification
- Kingdom: Animalia
- Phylum: Chordata
- Class: Actinopterygii
- Division: Teleostei
- Order: Centrarchiformes
- Family: Sinipercidae
- Genus: Siniperca; T. N. Gill, 1862

Type species
- Siniperca chuatsi Basilewsky, 1855

Synonyms
- Plectroperca W. K. H. Peters, 1864; Actenolepis Dybowski, 1872; Coreosiniperca P. W. Fang & L. T. Chong, 1932; Acroperca G. S. Myers, 1933

= Siniperca =

Genus of ray-finned fishes

Siniperca or the Chinese perch is a genus of centrarchiform ray-finned fish native to freshwater habitats in continental East Asia. Although its native ranges can extend to northern Vietnam, the majority of the species are entirely or largely restricted to China.

== Species ==
The currently recognized species in this genus are:

- Siniperca chuatsi (Basilewsky, 1855) (mandarin fish)
- Siniperca fortis (S. Y. Lin, 1932)
- Siniperca kneri Garman, 1912 (big-eye mandarin fish)
- Siniperca liuzhouensis C. W. Zhou, X. Y. Kong & S. R. Zhu, 1987
- Siniperca loona H. W. Wu, 1939
- Siniperca obscura Nichols, 1930
- Siniperca roulei H. W. Wu, 1930
- Siniperca scherzeri Steindachner, 1892 (golden or leopard mandarin fish)
- Siniperca undulata P. W. Fang & L. T. Chong, 1932
- Siniperca vietnamensis Đ. Y. Mai, 1978

The following fossil species are also known:

- †Siniperca ikikoku Yabumoto, 2020 (Middle Miocene of Japan)
- †Siniperca kaniensis (Ohe & Hayata, 1984) (Miocene of Japan)
- †Siniperca wusiangensis Liu & Su, 1962 (Pliocene of Shanxi, China)
