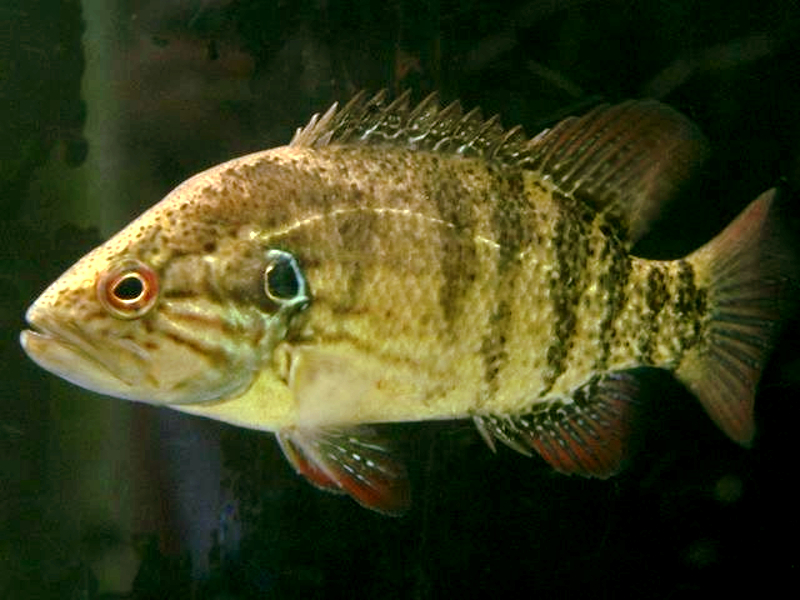
- Japanese perch, C. kawamebari

Scientific classification
- Kingdom: Animalia
- Phylum: Chordata
- Class: Actinopterygii
- Order: Centrarchiformes
- Family: Sinipercidae
- Genus: Coreoperca; Herzenstein, 1896

Type species
- Coreoperca herzi Herzenstein, 1896

Synonyms
- Bryttosus D. S. Jordan & Snyder, 1900

= Coreoperca =

Coreoperca Temporal range: Early Miocene–present

Genus of ray-finned fishes

Coreoperca is a genus of ray-finned fish native to eastern Asia. The members of the genus Coreoperca are known as the oriental perches or eastern perches, freshwater gamefish belonging to the family Sinipercidae. These fish prefer clear, slow-moving currents on the middle reaches of rivers. Eggs are laid in May and June on plants. The eggs and fry are protected by the male.

== Species ==
The currently recognized species in this genus are:

- Coreoperca herzi Herzenstein, 1896
- Coreoperca kawamebari (Temminck & Schlegel, 1843)(Japanese Perch, Redfin perch)
- Coreoperca liui L. Cao & X. F. Liang, 2013
- Coreoperca whiteheadi Boulenger, 1900

The following fossil species are also known:

- †Coreoperca chosun Nam, Nazarkin and Bannikov 2023 (Early Miocene of South Korea)
- †Coreoperca fushimiensis Ohe & Ono, 1975 (Miocene of Japan)
- †Coreoperca maruoi Yabumoto & Uyeno, 2009 (Middle Miocene of Japan)
- †Coreoperca shandongensis Chen, Liu and Yan, 1999 (Middle Miocene of Shanwang Formation in Shandong, China)
