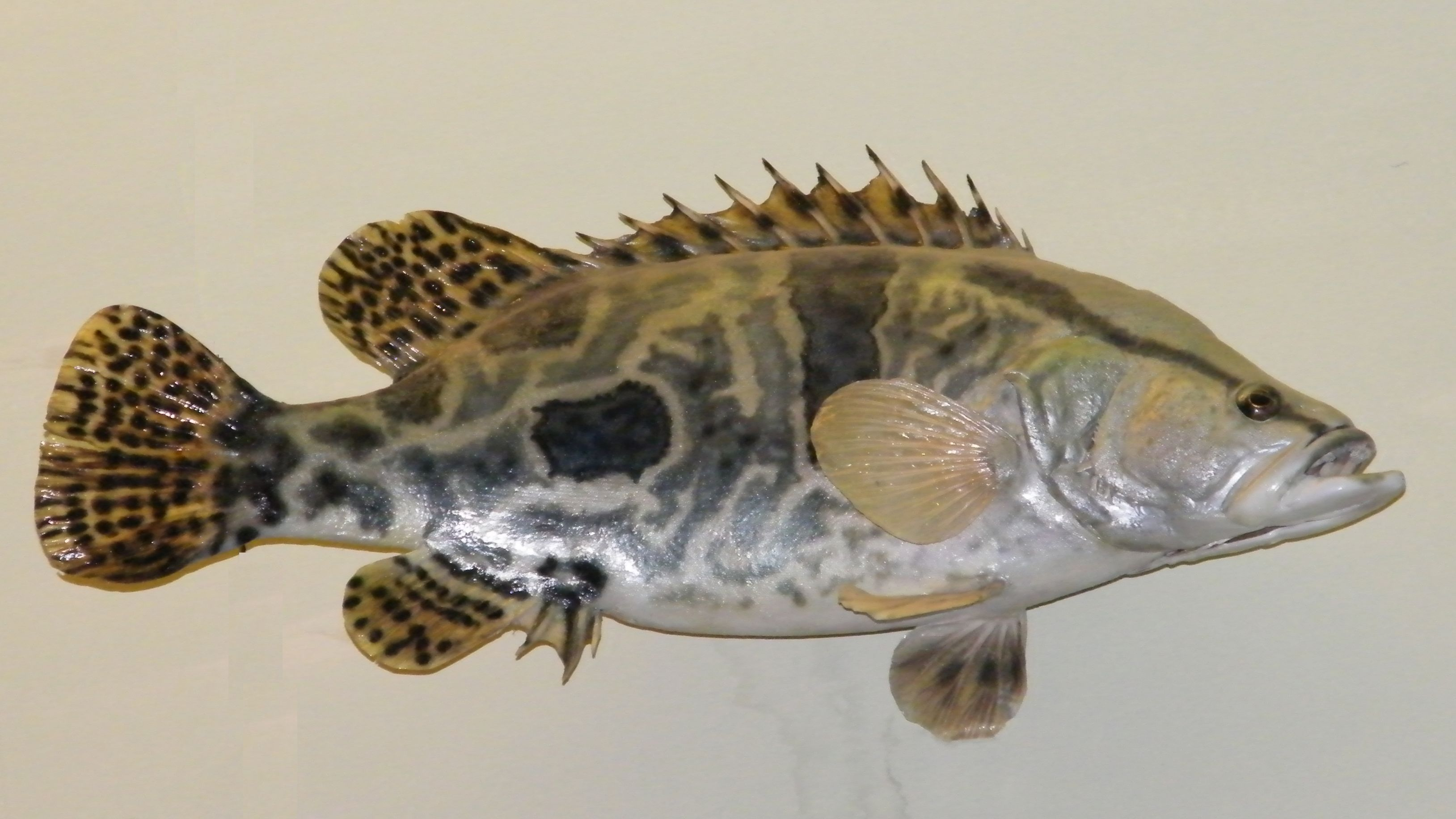

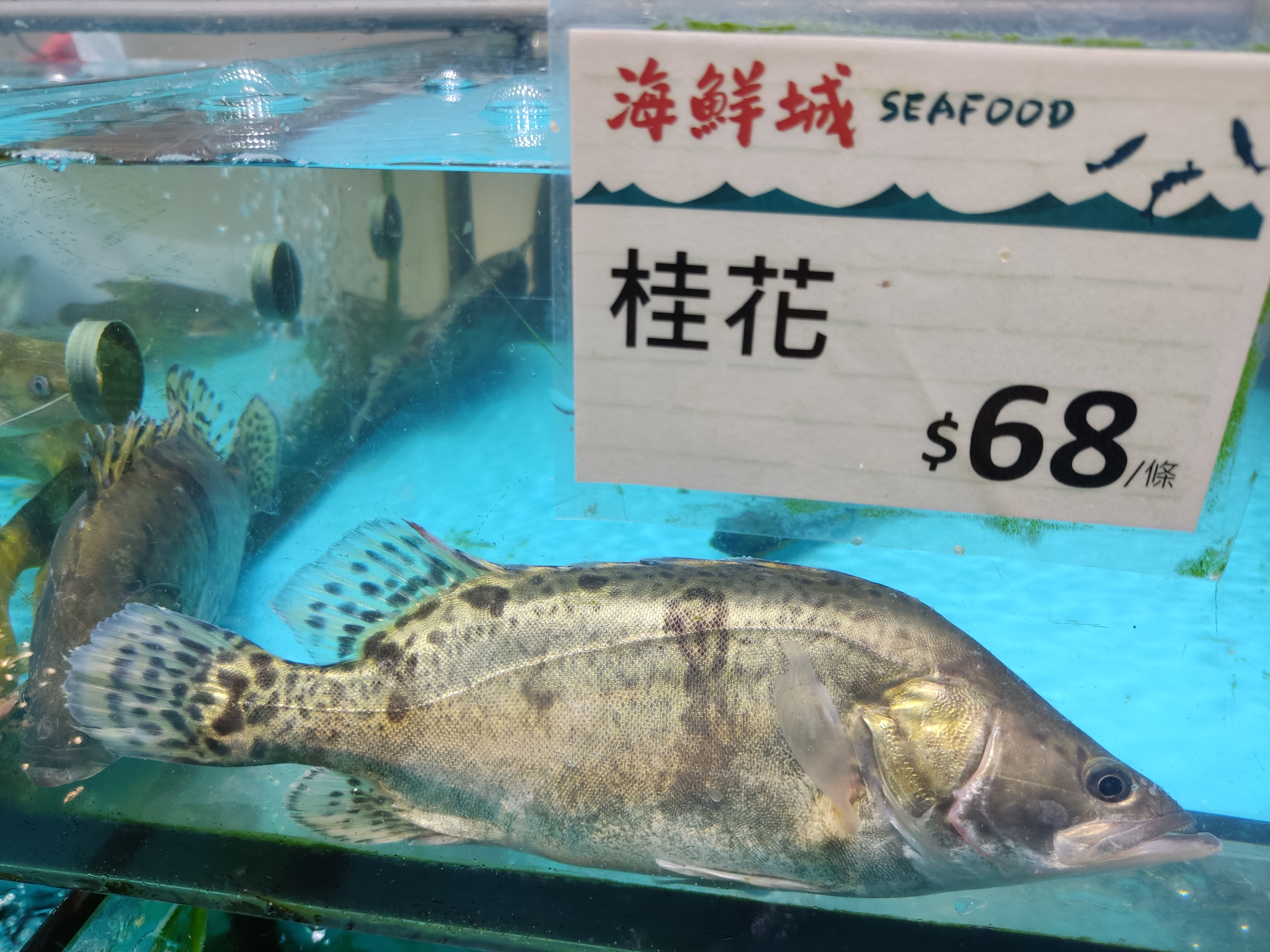

Conservation status
- Least Concern (IUCN 3.1)

Scientific classification
- Kingdom: Animalia
- Phylum: Chordata
- Class: Actinopterygii
- Division: Teleostei
- Order: Centrarchiformes
- Family: Sinipercidae
- Genus: Siniperca
- Species: S. chuatsi

Binomial name
- Siniperca chuatsi (Basilewsky, 1855)

Synonyms
- Perca chuatsi Basilewsky, 1855; Actenolepis ditmarii Dybowski, 1872

= Siniperca chuatsi =

Mandarin fish

Species of fish

Siniperca chuatsi, the mandarin fish (Chinese: 鱖魚), is a species of freshwater ray-finned fish from the family Sinipercidae, the Oriental perches. It is the type species of the genus Siniperca (Chinese perches).

== Taxonomy ==
Siniperca chuatsi was first formally described as Perca chuatsi in 1855 by the Russian ichthyologist, missionary and physician Stepan Ivanovich Basilewsky (died c. 1867) with the type locality given as "rivers in Hopei Province".

The generic name is a compound of sino meaning "of China" and perca meaning "perch" while the specific name chuatsi is a rendering of the local name of the fish.

== Distribution ==
Siniperca chuatsi is found in lowland freshwater habitats throughout continental East Asia excluding the Korean Peninsula, from the drainage basin of the Amur River in Russian Far East and Northeast China to the Pearl River basin in South China.

== Description ==
S. chuatsi

Siniperca chuatsi has a body which is compressed, with a protruding lower jaw and the maxilla reaching behind the eyes. The jaws are armed with rows of saw-like teeth. Lower jaw with 4–5 large sharp rays. There are two flat, sharp spines on the posterior margin of the operculum. It has small, round scales. It has a shiny brownish-yellow body marked with randomly situated coloured blotches and spots. They usually have black or dark grey stripes which run from their lips and run through the eyes over the lateral line but do not reach the back. It has a dorsal fin with the front part containing many hard spines with the rearmost having rounded tips. They have rounded pectoral, anal and caudal fins. There are three sharp spines situated in front of both pelvic and anal fins. The maximum recorded total length of 70 centimetres (28 in) and a maximum published weight of 8 kilograms (18 lb).

== Habitat and biology ==
Siniperca chuatsi are found in rivers which have dense growths of aquatic vegetation and water which can be quite turbid in the rainy season. They are demersal piscivores, stalking the fry of other fish species using their acute vision to track their prey before pouncing on them and enveloping them in their large mouth. The species of fish it mostly preys on are diurnal and have good colour vision and high visual acuity in daylight but which have poor night vision. Although it can live in near-freezing water, it only starts feeding when the temperature rises above 15 °C (59 °F) and breeding when it rises above 21 °C (70 °F).

== Uses ==
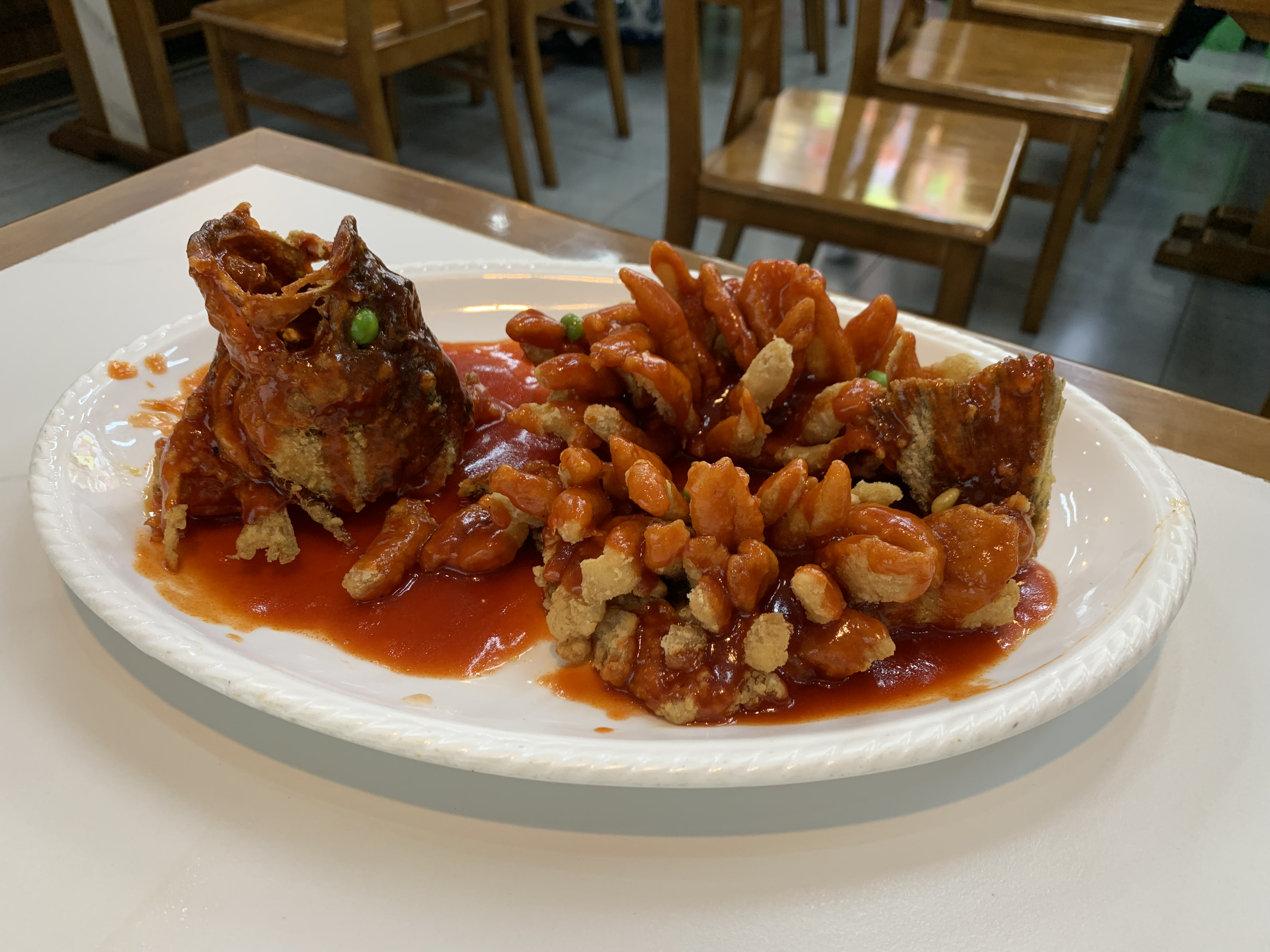
Squirrel fish, a specialty of Jiangsu cuisine

Siniperca chuatsi is both a popular game fish among anglers and a commercially important species in China, as it is a popular food fish and has been widely farmed in its native range since the 20th century. It first gained major popularity during the Tang dynasty (618–907 CE), appearing in many Chinese books and poems. The farmed fish are typically purebred, but sometimes hybrids between this species and its close relative the golden mandarin fish (S. scherzeri). The famed Jiangsu dish songshuyu (literally meaning "squirrel fish") is typically prepared with mandarin fish.
