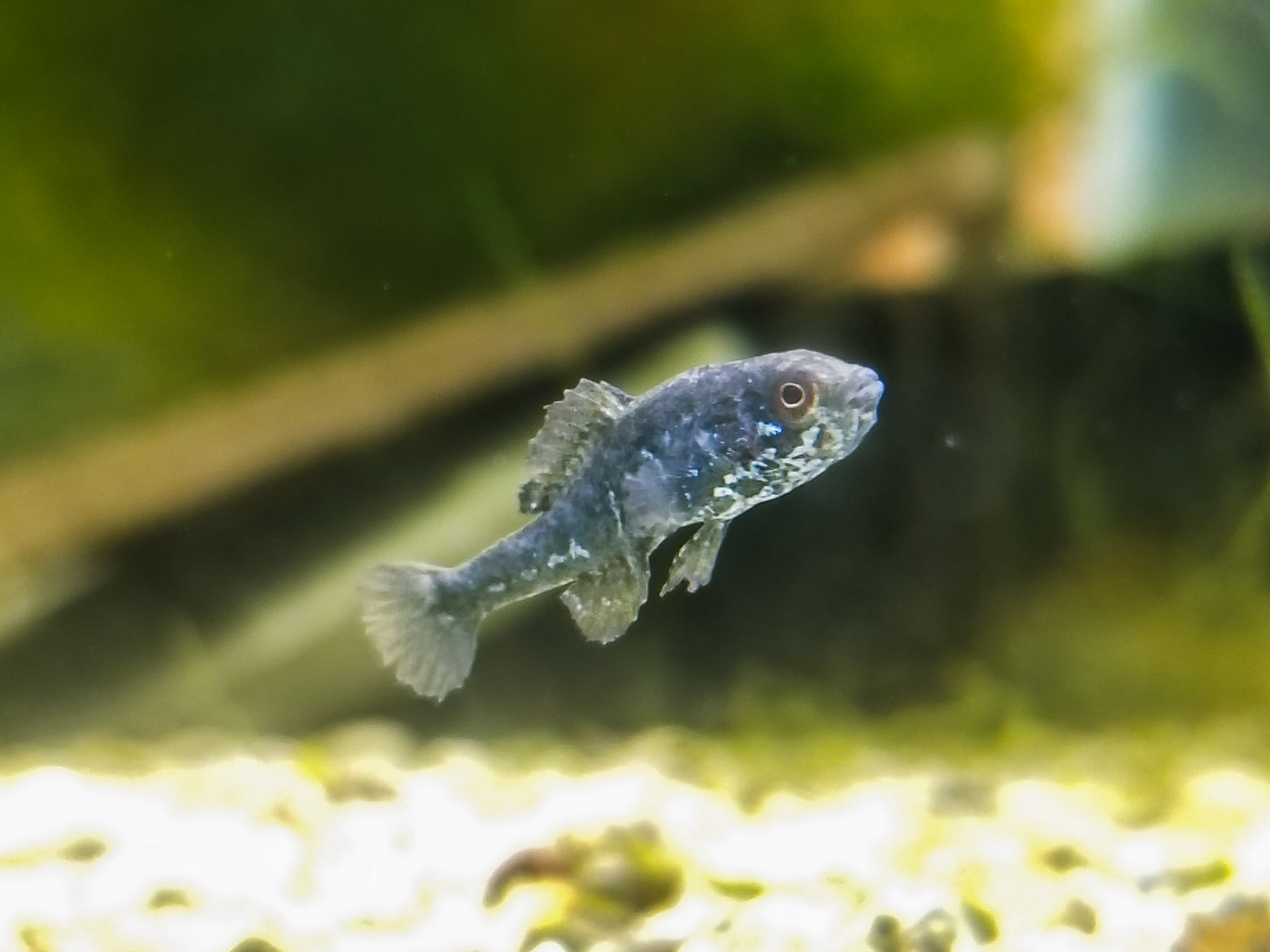

Conservation status
- Critically Endangered (IUCN 3.1)

Scientific classification
- Kingdom: Animalia
- Phylum: Chordata
- Class: Actinopterygii
- Order: Centrarchiformes
- Family: Elassomatidae
- Genus: Elassoma
- Species: E. alabamae

Binomial name
- Elassoma alabamae Mayden, 1993

= Spring pygmy sunfish =

Species of fish

The spring pygmy sunfish, Elassoma alabamae, is a species of pygmy sunfish endemic to springs in northern Alabama. It was historically known to occur in springs in North Alabama along the Tennessee River in Limestone and Lauderdale counties. The spring pygmy sunfish was first discovered in Cave Spring in Lauderdale County, Alabama in 1937 but in 1938, this site was flooded by the creation of the Pickwick Reservoir. The spring pygmy sunfish was considered extinct until its rediscovery in the Beaverdam Spring complex in 1973 by researchers from the University of Tennessee.

== Appearance ==
The spring pygmy sunfish is a small fish that rarely exceeds an inch long. Males and females exhibit different coloration. Breeding males are vividly colored. Overall the breeding male is very dark except for vertical, iridescent blue-green bars along the body and iridescent mottling on the cheek. Females are more muted in coloration when compared to the males.

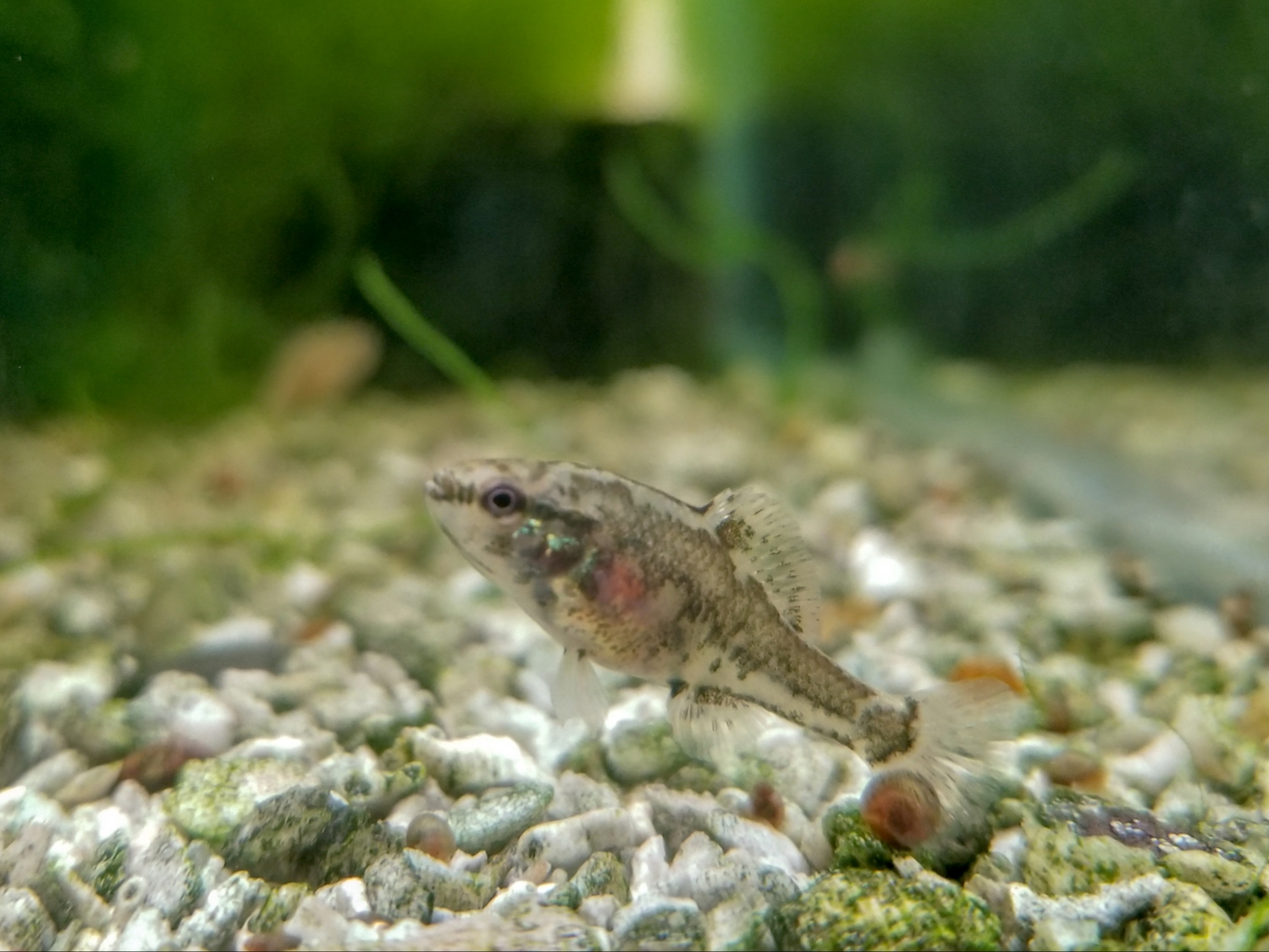
A female pygmy sunfish

== Habitat ==
The preferred habitat for the spring pygmy sunfish is spring water, and associated spring-fed wetlands. The species is most abundant at the spring head and spring pool area.

== Diet ==
Diet likely consists of small aquatic invertebrates such as amphipods, isopods, and larvae of mayflies, caddisflies, and midges.

== Range ==
=== Historical range ===
Historically, this fish was known to occur at two other sites in northern Alabama, one in Limestone County and the other in Lauderdale County. The species decline has been attributed to water pollution, a reduction of water quantity and impoundments. It was listed as a threatened species under the Endangered Species Act in 2013.

=== Current range ===
Currently, the only spring-dwelling population occurs in Limestone County in the Beaverdam-Moss Spring/Swamp spring system, where it is threatened by the construction of an automobile plant, though a conservation agreement was reached between the manufacturers and the Center for Biological Diversity. The Beaverdam spring and creek complex was formerly thought to be the only remaining habitat of the species, but in 2015 another population was discovered in the Blackwell Swamp of Wheeler National Wildlife Refuge in Madison County.

== Conservation challenges ==
The spring pygmy sunfish and its habitat are currently facing the threats of both declining water quality and quantity. Possible excessive groundwater usage, and the resultant reduction of water quantity in the aquifer/recharge areas and decreased spring outflow in the Beaverdam Spring/Creek system, is believed to have negatively impacted the spring pygmy sunfish and its habitat. Increased contamination of the recharge area and aquifer from the intensive use of chemicals (i.e., herbicides, pesticides, fertilizers) and possible overgrazing by livestock and land clearing near and within the water systems reduces the vegetation in the spring and increases stormwater runoff within the spring pygmy sunfish's habitat. Stormwater discharge from agricultural lands compounds the water quality degradation by increasing sediment load and depositing contaminants into surface and groundwater sources. Recently, land use practices have begun to change surrounding spring pygmy sunfish habitat. Land that has been historically used for agriculture is being converted into higher density residential and industrial developments. These large-scale residential and industrial developments can place a different set of environmental stressors (i.e. impervious surfaces and stormwater runoff) on aquatic habitats and potentially reduce water quantity and quality within the Beaverdam Spring/Creek system.
