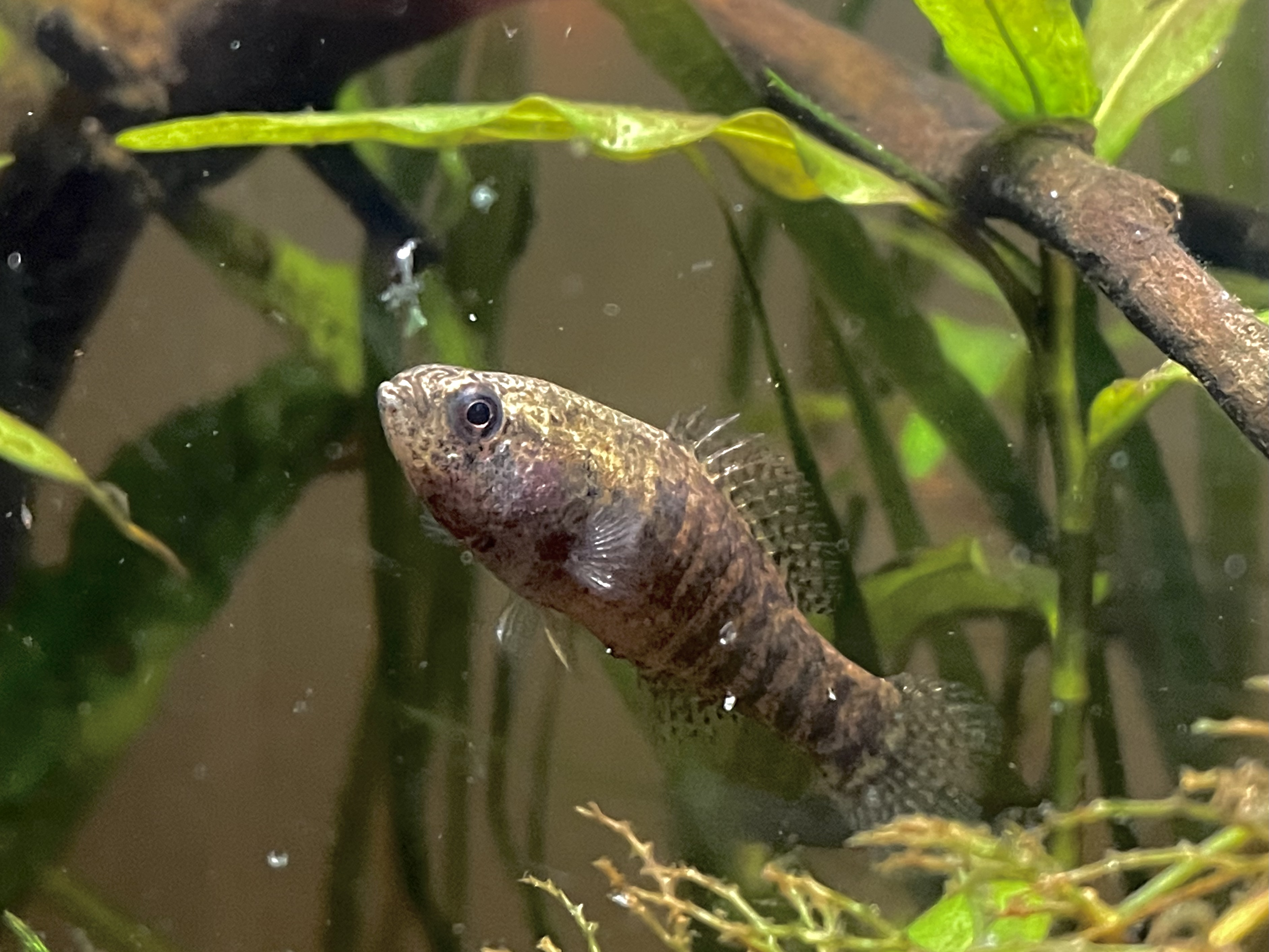

Conservation status
- Least Concern (IUCN 3.1)

Scientific classification
- Kingdom: Animalia
- Phylum: Chordata
- Class: Actinopterygii
- Order: Centrarchiformes
- Family: Elassomatidae
- Genus: Elassoma
- Species: E. zonatum

Binomial name
- Elassoma zonatum D. S. Jordan, 1877

= Banded pygmy sunfish =

Species of fish

The banded pygmy sunfish, Elassoma zonatum, is a species of pygmy sunfish endemic to the United States, where it is found from Indiana and Illinois to Texas to the Atlantic coast. It prefers densely vegetated bodies of slow-moving water. This species can reach 4.7 cm (1.9 in) in total length, though most do not exceed 3.5 cm (1.4 in).

The banded pygmy sunfish are capable of retaining their juvenile characteristics while they are sexually mature; that is to say that they are neotenous.

It was originally thought that the banded pygmy sunfish belonged to the cichlid family. However, researchers Hay, Jordan, and Gilbert thought that the banded pygmy sunfish was actually an intermediate species of fish between the pirate perch and the centrarchid family of fishes. Therefore, the banded pygmy sunfish was placed into its own family, Elassomatidae. In the 5th edition of Fishes of the World, though, this is treated as a subfamily of the sunfish family Centrarchidae. More recent authorities treat it again as its own family, although closely related to the Centrarchidae.

== Etymology ==
The banded pygmy sunfishes scientific name is Elassoma zonatum where Elassoma means small body and Zonatum means banded.

== Distribution ==
The banded pygmy sunfish is a small fish that can live in rivers, streams, lakes, ponds, and even swamps. This species is historically found only in the continental United States, with relatively little change in distribution. One exception to this is minor decreases in species distribution due to habitat loss. They have historically been residents of the Mississippi River drainage system and Gulf coastal plain region. Currently, they are found from the lower Roanoke River drainage in North Carolina to the southern to middle parts of the St. Johns River in Florida. Also, they are found west to the Brazos River drainage in Texas and north to lower Wabash River drainage in Indiana and Illinois. Being a member of Elassomatidae, this species of pygmy sunfish is similar in habitat preferences. It prefers to live in slower to still water conditions with higher sedimentation content, hence the swamps and ponds. However, the human development of wetland habitat over the ages has caused a decrease in banded pygmy sunfish and other pygmy sunfish habitat. Though the banded pygmy sunfish can retreat to lakes, streams, and rivers when wetlands are being drained, they need the wetlands for breeding. Thus, the true reason for the disappearance of the banded pygmy sunfish from certain areas is not just a loss of any habitat, but the loss of its breeding habitat. When this happens, the population eventually dies off, leaving an area that can no longer support the species.

== Ecology ==
Stomach contents of 46 individual banded pygmy sunfish (26 of which were spawning adults) collected at Mound, Louisiana, were examined for food identification. The main food identified included insect larvae (mostly from the family Chironomidae), small crustaceans, and snail eggs. The crustaceans and snail eggs combined constituted the majority of the content. Next in quantity were insect larvae. Minute amounts of algal spores were ingested by these fish. These algae were most likely taken in accidentally with other prey in the presence of algal blooms. Lastly, no other fish species or banded pygmy sunfish larvae were found in the stomach contents. The banded pygmy sunfish lives in rather eutrophic conditions such as swamps and ponds. They are able to live in sedimentation levels that make oxygen availability less than 0.5 mg/L of water. Very few fish species can survive in this hypoxic condition. The only other notable fish that affect E. zonatum are live-bearers (Poeciliidae), grass pickerel (Esox americanus), and bowfins (Amia calva). The bowfins are known to be occasional predators on the pygmy sunfish family. Occasionally, the grass pickerel and live-bearers are competitors for food with the pygmy sunfish. Other than fish, water snakes and fish-eating birds are known to be enemies. Water beetles and Odonata nymphs are known to be competitors for insect larvae. Wetland habitat is important for spawning habitat, but it is also an important habitat for food and protection. It provides dense plant matter (especially Ceratophyllum) for cover against predators and as a laying area of snail eggs. This habitat is also excellent as a source for insect eggs and larvae. Thus, the human development of wetland habitat not only affects Elassomatidae, but several other species of fish and insects, as well.

== Life history ==
Banded pygmy sunfish are spring spawners which usually spawn in March. Eggs are laid on ceratophyllum if it is available, as it is in most wetland areas. If not enough ceratophyllum or similar vegetation is available, then eggs are scattered out on rocky bottoms in still water. The entire spawning process takes about 5–6 min. After the eggs are laid, the male chases the female away from the nest site, since she would cannibalize the eggs. This species of pygmy sunfish can spawn two or three times in a year as determined by ova regrowth. About 96–970 eggs will be in a clutch depending on a female size range of 2.25 to 3.5 cm (0.89 to 1.38 in) in length, respectively, as well as on the fecundity of the female. Egg diameter ranges from 3.7 to 3.8 mm (0.15 to 0.15 in). The egg, on average, takes 110 hours before it begins to hatch. The newly hatched larvae are tadpole-like in shape with four pairs of gill arches with a rhythmic gill movement. The eyes are without pigment and no mouth is developed at this stage. Protein from the yolk enters the body through diffusion into the blood stream until the mouth is fully developed. Larvae are recorded from 3.5 to 3.7 mm (0.14 to 0.15 in) in length and the juveniles are from 8.0 to 8.5 mm (0.31 to 0.33 in) in length. The time it takes for newly hatched larvae to mature into full-grown adults is on average 100 days. Cooler temperatures of 21–23 °C (70–73 °F) are optimal for growth. Adults are sexually mature at one year of age. The average lifespan of a banded pygmy sunfish is around 2.5 years, with the maximum recorded age at three years.

== Reproductive behavior ==
Male E. zonatum become extremely brightly colored before and during the spawning period, while females retain their normal color.

There are two different types of behavioral displays, which males will participate in during spawning. The first is known as the "sliding threat display". During this display, when one male encroaches on another male's territory, the offended or "violated", male will swim near to the intruder male and expand his fins showing his size while his caudal fin beats extremely rapidly and the entire body's coloration intensifies. After that, the male will turn himself broadside to increase his apparent size. If this display fails, the male will then swim within range of striking the intruder fish while arcing his body so that his head and tail are closest to the intruder fish and proceed to strike. The strike occurs so quickly that researchers could not determine whether any physical contact had occurred at all, and the two fish swim away from the brawl unharmed. The intruder fish will swim away from the territory while the victorious male chases him even further away.

The second display is known as the "wiggle waggle display". This display occurred when a female that would be a potential spawning partner entered into his territory. The male would begin by approaching the desired female very slowly, if she stays and does not swim away, he will begin to "dance" erratically; meaning he will swim toward the spawning vegetation in an up-and-down pattern while raising and lowering his dorsal and anal fins, and alternately flexing and opening his pelvic fins. This behavior will continue from the male for a few minutes. The male then will typically bite the female consecutively, which will persuade her to join him in the spawning site. Once the female enters into the spawning site, the male becomes brightly colored, and the female positions herself in the vegetation in such a way that is best suitable for the eggs. The male will then nip at the female's genital region while she is positioning herself fin the vegetation at the spawning site. This will last for two to three minutes and then the male will align himself with the female and, while both fish are in the upright position, the sperm and egg are extruded allowing for fertilization to occur.

The male typically guards the nest with the eggs for the next 72–100 hours.

== Management ==
Certain members of the genus Elassoma have been listed as threatened species, but the banded pygmy sunfish is one of the few widespread enough to stay off that federal list. No state agency has listed the banded pygmy sunfish as threatened, either. Habitat loss is the most immediate threat to this species. As wetland habitat is lost due to industrialization and agriculture breeding habitat and important food species disappear with it. Efforts are in place today to manage wetland habitat across the country. The federal standards of the USDA are to retain a minimum of 2% wetland in every state territory in the eastern United States. While no agency or refuge is set up to protect this species, the conservation of wetland habitat acts as an umbrella for the species to maintain its population numbers. Fortunately, this resilient species can survive in eutrophic conditions and warmer temperatures. While some members of Elassomatidae can hybridize, E. zonatum can not.

Monitoring of this species has been done by seining and performing sample counts. Certain habitats with high population densities should be set aside for protection. So far, no invasive species has been noted to compete with or prey on the banded pygmy sunfish.
