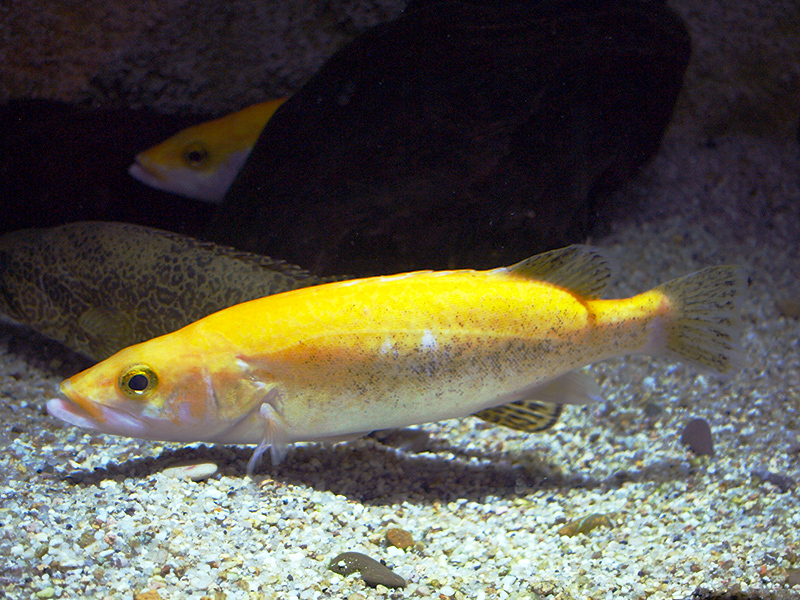
- Yellow (foreground) and speckled (behind) individuals

Conservation status
- Data Deficient (IUCN 3.1)

Scientific classification
- Kingdom: Animalia
- Phylum: Chordata
- Class: Actinopterygii
- Division: Teleostei
- Order: Centrarchiformes
- Family: Sinipercidae
- Genus: Siniperca
- Species: S. scherzeri

Binomial name
- Siniperca scherzeri Steindachner, 1892

Synonyms
- Siniperca scherzeri scherzeri Steindachner, 1892; Siniperca chui P. W. Fang & L. T. Chong, 1932; Siniperca scherzeri chui P. W. Fang & L. T. Chong, 1932; Siniperca kwangsiensis P. W. Fang & L. T. Chong, 1932; Siniperca scherzeri kwangsiensis P. W. Fang & L. T. Chong, 1932; Siniperca scherzeri kichuani H. J. Shih, 1937; Siniperca kichuani H. J. Shih, 1937

= Golden mandarin fish =

Species of ray-finned fish

The golden mandarin fish (Siniperca scherzeri), also known as the leopard mandarin fish, is a species of freshwater ray-finned fish, an Asian perch of the family Sinipercidae, which is native to eastern Asia (Korea, China, and Vietnam). This species can reach at least 33.4 cm (1.1 ft) in standard length and 607.3 g (1.34 lb) in weight. It is typically yellowish-brown with blackish-brown speckles ("leopard"), but there are also bright yellow ("golden") individuals, which are particularly prized in Korea and selectively bred in captivity.

It is a commercially important fish, but has declined due to overfishing and habitat loss. It is farmed, typically using pure specimens, but sometimes involving hybrids with the faster-growing mandarin fish (Siniperca chuatsi). Danyang County, North Chungcheong Province organizes a fishing festival for golden mandarin fish every April.

== Genomics ==
A chromosome-level genome assembly of the golden mandarin fish (Siniperca scherzeri) was published in 2026. The genome size is approximately 758 Mb, with the assembly anchored to 24 chromosomes. The assembly has a BUSCO completeness of 97.8%, and 24,615 protein-coding genes were predicted.
