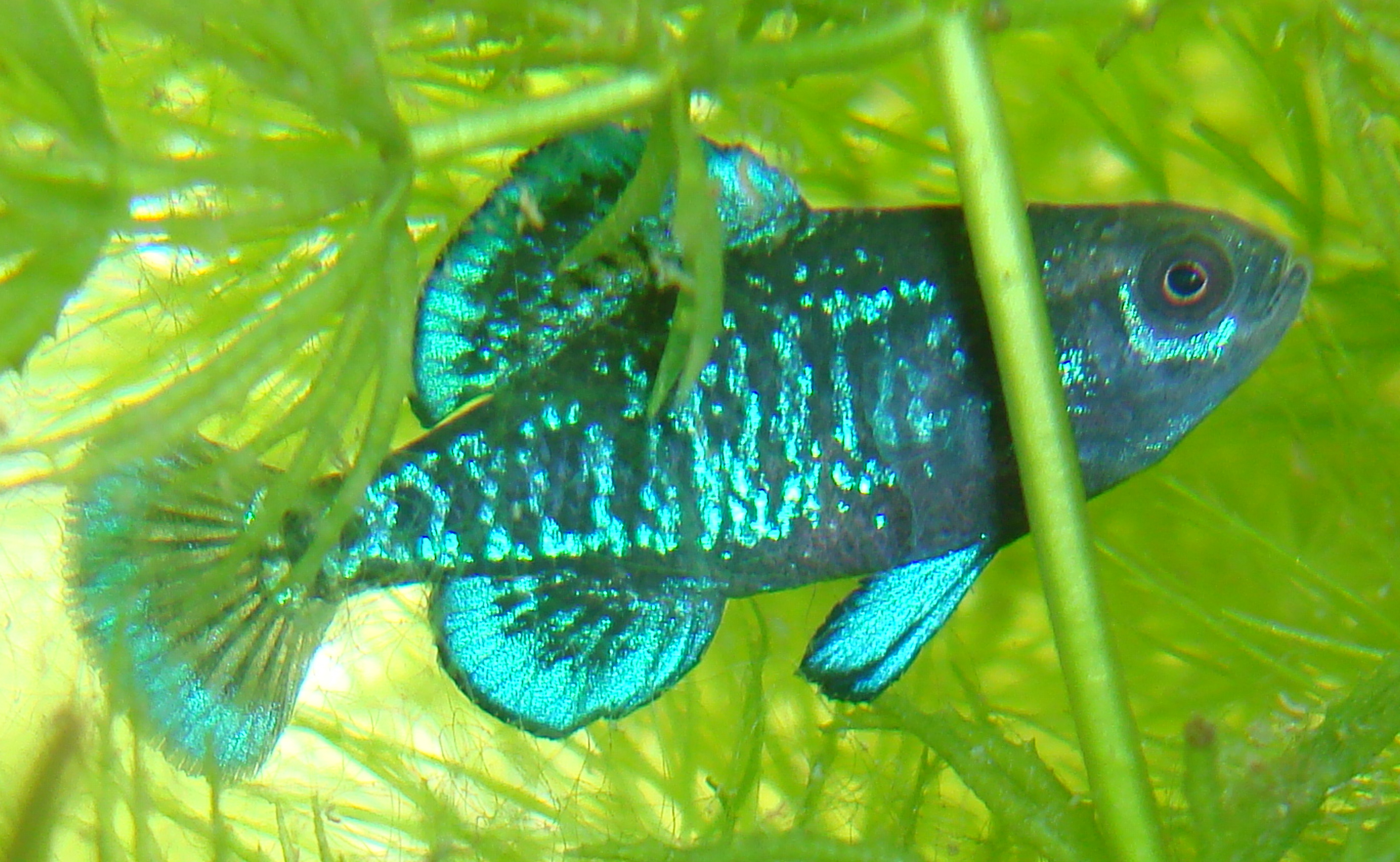
- Male in breeding colors

Conservation status
- Least Concern (IUCN 3.1)

Scientific classification
- Kingdom: Animalia
- Phylum: Chordata
- Class: Actinopterygii
- Order: Centrarchiformes
- Family: Elassomatidae
- Genus: Elassoma
- Species: E. gilberti

Binomial name
- Elassoma gilberti Snelson, Krabbenhoft & Quattro, 2009

= Gulf Coast pygmy sunfish =

Species of fish

The Gulf Coast pygmy sunfish, Elassoma gilberti, is a species of pygmy sunfish endemic to Florida, United States. This species can reach 2.5 centimetres (0.98 in) in standard length.

== Etymology ==
The fish is named in honor of Carter R. Gilbert (1930–2022), who was the Curator of Fishes at the Florida Museum of Natural History from 1961 to 1998, because of his many contributions to the study of North American fishes.

Elasoma gilberti is closely related to E. okefenokee, and the two species are nearly indistinguishable in appearance. E. gilberti in general has four preopercular canal pores, while E. okefenokee on average has three. The average number of anal fin rays is seven in E. gilberti and eight in E. okefenokee. The female E. gilberti often expresses a blue patch of color behind her eye, while the E. okefenokee does not.

== Range and ecology ==
This species occurs in northwestern Florida and southwestern Georgia in the lower Suwannee River drainage and other Gulf of Mexico drainages from the Waccasassa River west to Choctawhatchee Bay. They are usually found in slackwater environments, among dense aquatic vegetation and leaf litter, where they feed mainly on tiny insects, crustaceans, and worms.

== Spawning ==
Elassoma gilberti will breed in a wide range of water conditions, and spawning has been confirmed in both 0 DH and 20 DH water. Males require a region of dense living or artificial rooted aquatic plants to claim as territory to woo females in to spawn. Each spawning male claims about a cubic foot of volume as his territory. The males spend their time patrolling around their territories and dancing to catch the females' attention. When dancing, they wiggle their dorsal, anal, and caudal fins to show off their bright blue iridescence. Then, suddenly, they do a full stop, holding completely still for a few seconds with no visible motion. After the pause, they continue dancing again, often moving up and down in their eagerness to woo the female into their respective clumps of dense plants. Females swim in and out of the males' territories to spawn. The male then guards the spawn site until the eggs hatch, chasing females and other males away.

It takes about three to four days for the eggs to hatch. At this point, the male stops protecting the spawn site and becomes receptive to spawning again.
