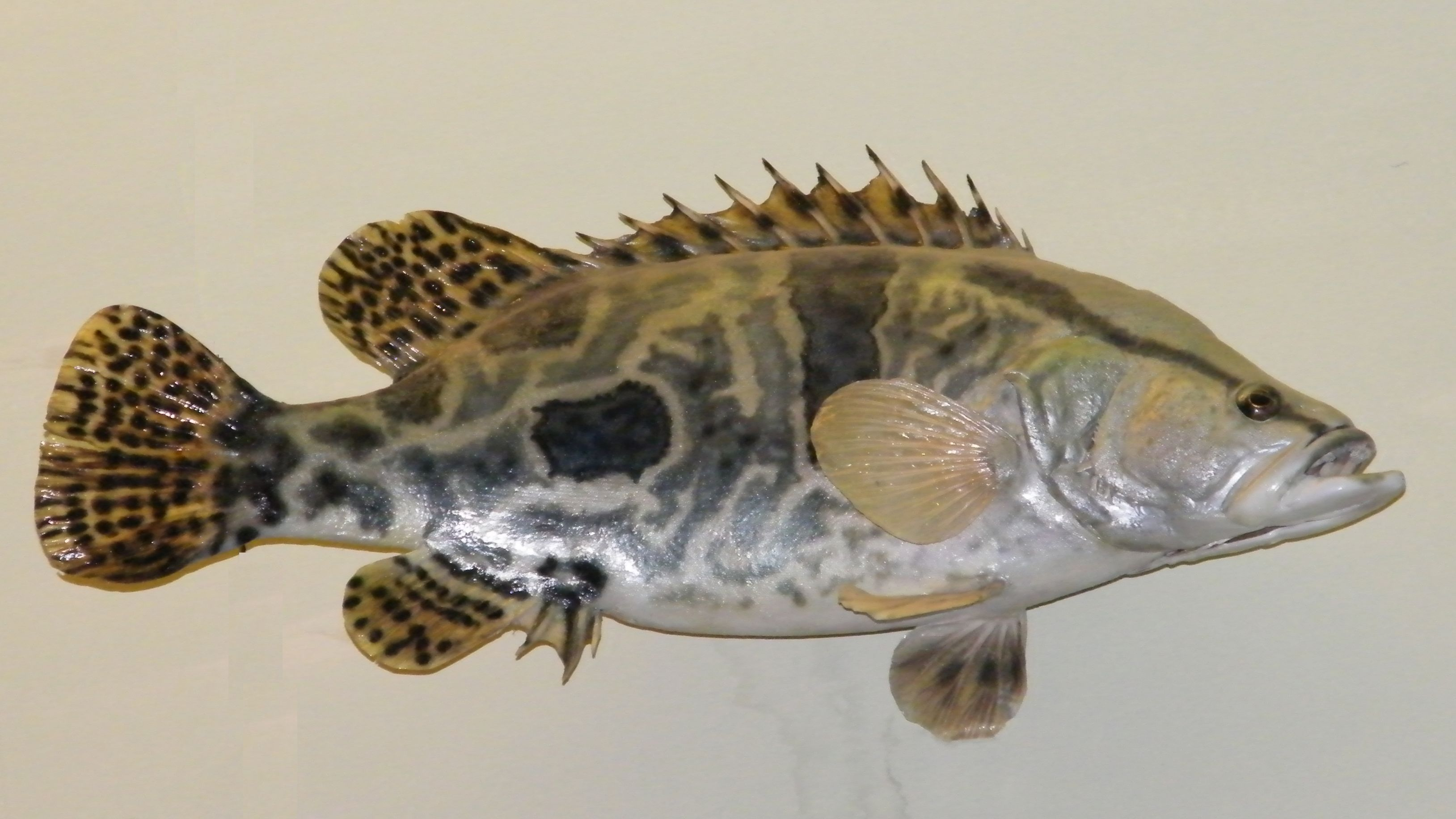
- Siniperca chuatsi
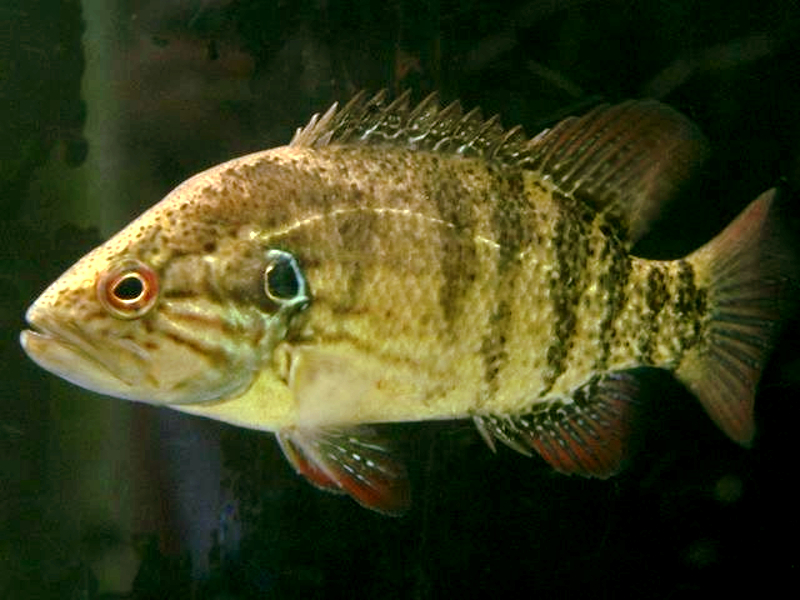
- Coreoperca kawamebari

Scientific classification
- Kingdom: Animalia
- Phylum: Chordata
- Class: Actinopterygii
- Division: Teleostei
- Order: Centrarchiformes
- Suborder: Centrarchoidei
- Family: Sinipercidae; D.S. Jordan & R.E. Richardson, 1910

Type species
- Siniperca chuatsi Basilewsky, 1855

Genera
- See text

= Sinipercidae =

Sinipercidae Temporal range: Early Miocene–present

Family of ray-finned fishes

Sinipercidae, the Chinese perches or Oriental perches, is a family of freshwater ray-finned fishes, part of the order Centrarchiformes. They have been placed within the temperate perch family (Percichthyidae) in the past, but are now known to be most closely related to the North American freshwater sunfish and pygmy sunfish, within Centrarchidae and Elassomatidae.

The earliest known member of the group in the fossil record is Coreoperca chosun from the Early Miocene of South Korea.

== Behaviour ==
Based on genetic adaption, species of Sinipercidae fish have different growth, predatory feeding habit, aggression and pyloric caeca development. These fishes mostly eat live prey fishes because they have low Ectodysplasin A Receptor(EDAR) and very few gill rakers. In some species, larvae are cannibals at first feeding which leads to death of predator and prey.

== Genera ==
There are two extant genera and one extinct genus within the family Sinipercidae:

- Coreoperca Herzenstein, 1896
- Siniperca Gill, 1862
- †Inabaperca Yabumoto & Uyeno, 2000
