= Squirrel fish =

Well-known dish in Jiangsu cuisine

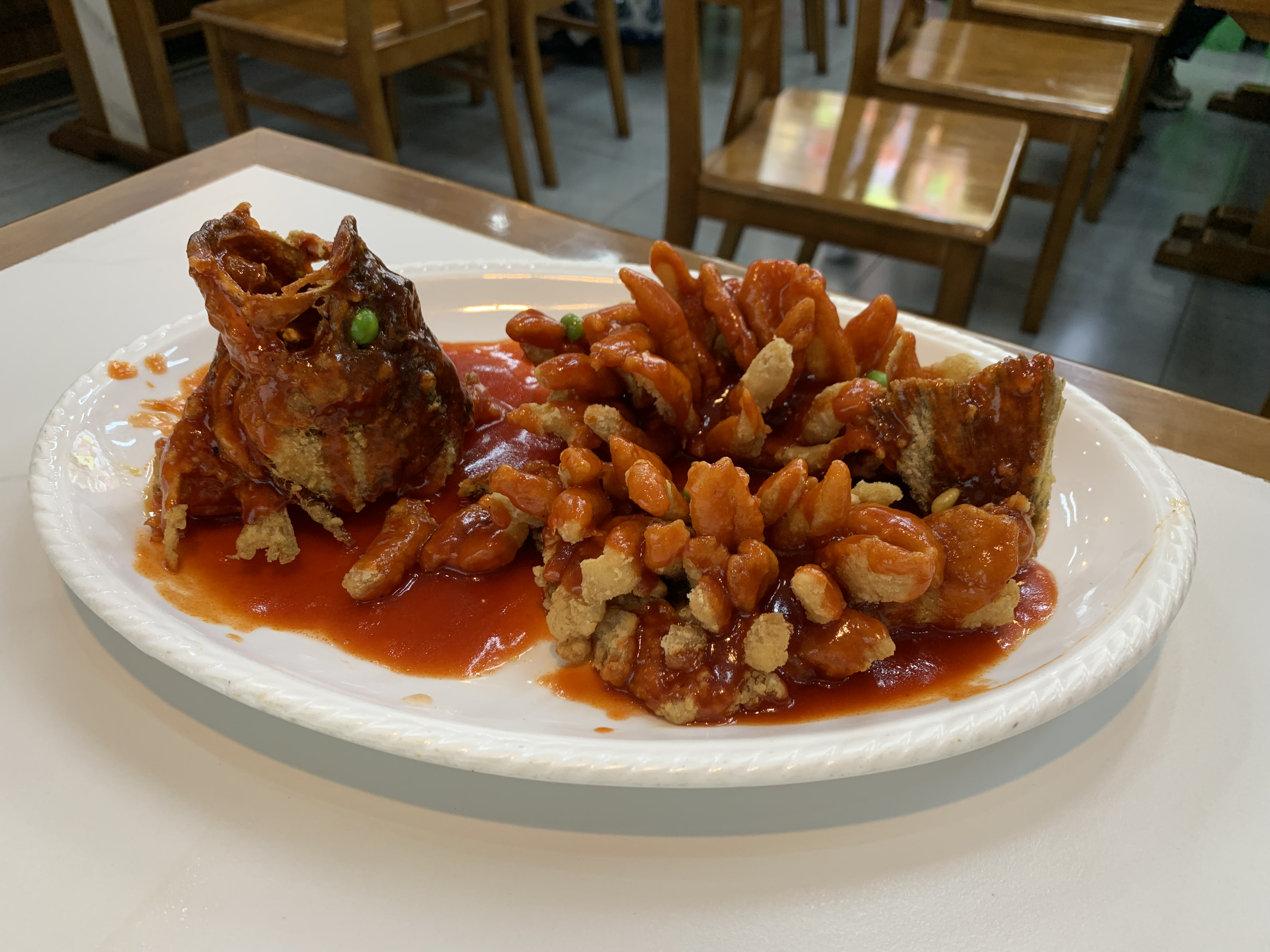
- Squirrel fish served in Suzhou
- Place of origin: China
- Region or state: Suzhou
- Main ingredients: Mandarin fish, sweet and sour sauce

Squirrel fish (Chinese: 松鼠鱖魚; pinyin: sōngshǔ guìyú) or Squirrel-shaped Mandarin Fish is a well-known dish in Jiangsu cuisine, originally from Suzhou. It is prepared by deboning and carving a mandarin fish into an ornamental shape similar to a squirrel, and then deep-frying it in batter before dousing it in sweet and sour sauce.

== Gallery ==
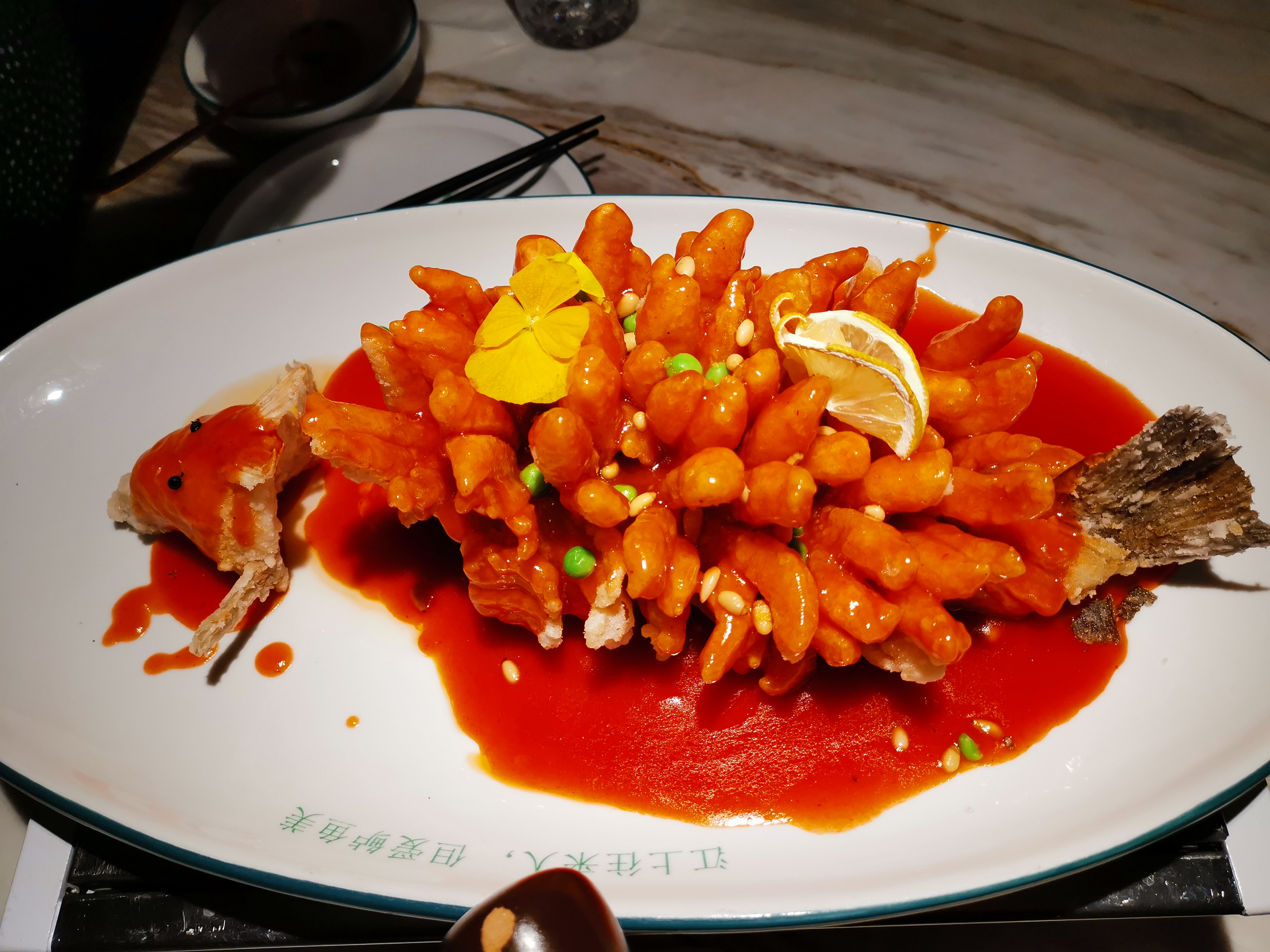

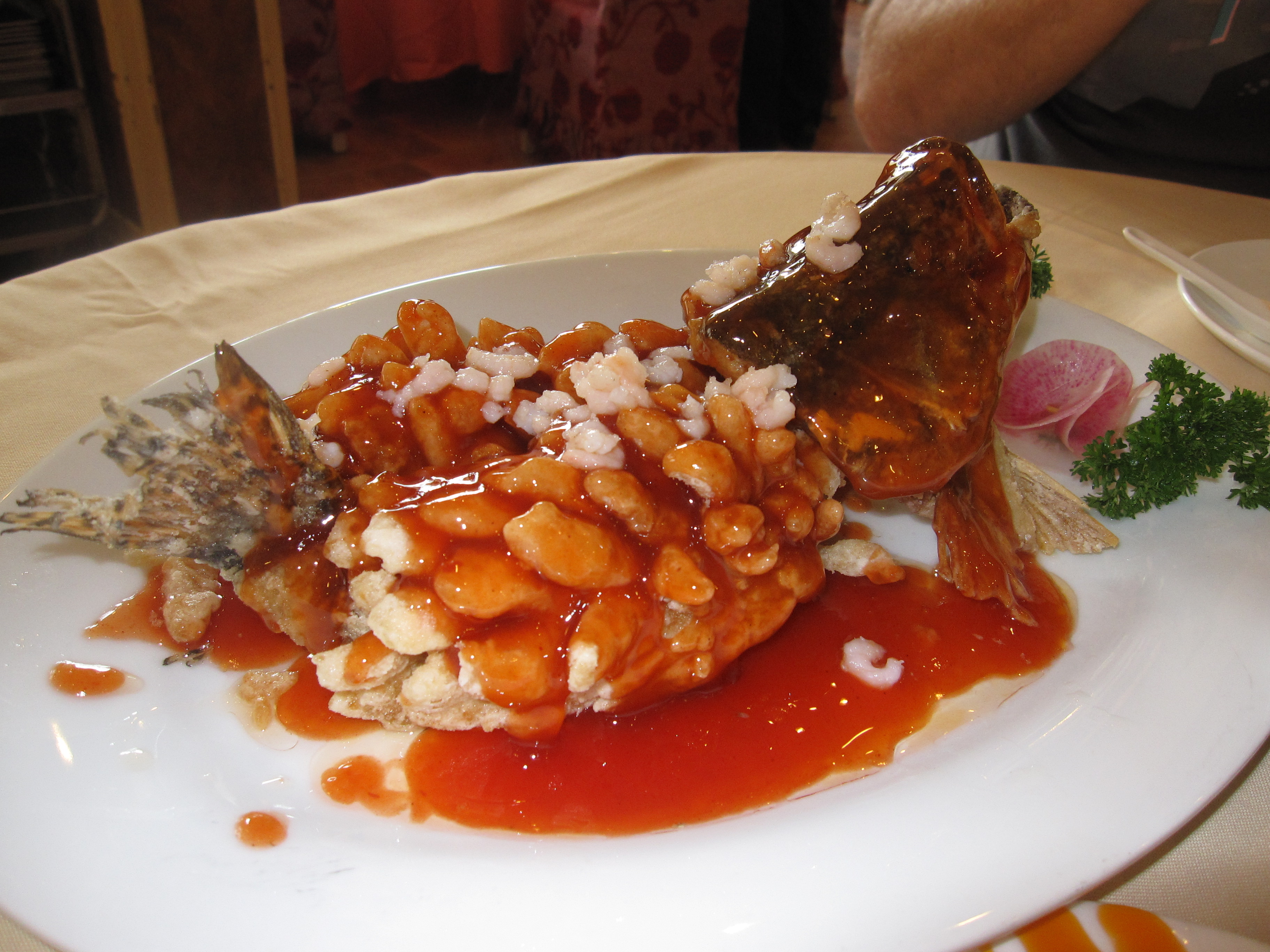

== See also ==
- West Lake Fish in Vinegar Gravy (西湖醋鱼), a similarly famous fish dish from Hangzhou
