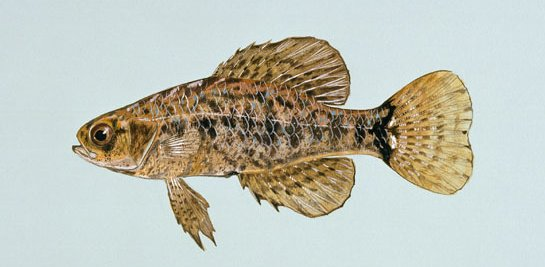
- Unidentified species

Scientific classification
- Kingdom: Animalia
- Phylum: Chordata
- Class: Actinopterygii
- Order: Centrarchiformes
- Suborder: Centrarchoidei
- Family: Elassomatidae; D. S. Jordan, 1877
- Genus: Elassoma; D. S. Jordan, 1877

Type species
- Elassoma zonata D. S. Jordan, 1877

Species
- See text.

= Pygmy sunfish =

Elassoma

Genus of ray-finned fishes

Elassoma is a genus of freshwater fish, the only member of family Elassomatidae in the order Centrarchiformes. The type species is E. zonatum, the banded pygmy sunfish. The Elassomatidae are known collectively as pygmy sunfishes, and are thought to be closely related to the true freshwater sunfishes in Centrarchidae. In the past, researchers believed they were related to sticklebacks and pipefishes (order Syngnathiformes) rather than Centrarchiformes, though genetic research strongly implies a close relationship with the centrarchids.

The pygmy sunfishes grow to a maximum overall length of 3 to 4 cm (1 to 1.5 in). They occur mostly in temperate and subtropical swamps, marshes, and other shallow, slow-moving, and heavily vegetated waters, across an area of the American South stretching from the Coastal Plain of North Carolina to central Florida, west along the Gulf Coast to eastern Texas, and north up the Mississippi River Valley to southern Illinois. The bluebarred, Carolina, and spring pygmy sunfishes have small localized populations and are considered Vulnerable.

The pygmy sunfishes are too small to be game fish, but are relatively popular as aquarium fish because of the males' iridescent colors and fascinating breeding behaviors. Eggs are laid on or beneath dense vegetation, and the male guards the nest area until the fry hatch and scatter. They adapt well to small aquaria and are relatively adaptable to a range of conditions, but seldom take conventional prepared fish foods, instead requiring small live worms, insects, or crustaceans as food.

== Etymology ==
The generic name Elassoma derives from the Greek ελάσσων (elasson) meaning smaller and σώμα (soma) meaning body, in reference to the fishes' diminutive size compared to the typical sunfishes.

== Species ==
The currently recognized species in this genus are:

Species	Common name	Image
Elassoma alabamae Mayden, 1993	spring pygmy sunfish	
Elassoma boehlkei Rohde & R. G. Arndt, 1987	Carolina pygmy sunfish	
Elassoma evergladei D. S. Jordan, 1884	Everglades pygmy sunfish	
Elassoma gilberti Snelson, Krabbenhoft & Quattro, 2009	Gulf Coast pygmy sunfish	
Elassoma okatie Rohde & R. G. Arndt, 1987	bluebarred pygmy sunfish	
Elassoma okefenokee J. E. Böhlke, 1956	Okefenokee pygmy sunfish	
Elassoma zonatum D. S. Jordan, 1877	banded pygmy sunfish	

== See also ==
- List of fish families

== Other sources ==
- North American Native Fishes Association (NANFA) Elassoma forum Pygmy Sunfishes - NANFA Forum
- Duzen, Bill. "The Pygmy Sunfish." The Native Fish Conservancy Website.
