= Morwong =

Morwong is a common name used for a variety of fishes and may refer to:

- Cheilodactylidae a family in which some of the species are called morwongs.
  - Goniistius, a clade within the Cheilodactylidae, traditionally classified as members of the genus Cheilodactylus, classified by some authorities as a genus within the family Latridae. Its member species all have the common name morwong.
    - Spottedtail morwong (Cheilodactylus (Goniistus) zonatus), a species of fish in the clade Goniistius traditionally classified as a member of the genus Cheilodactylus, classified by some authorities as a species within the family Latridae.
  - Morwong a clade within the family Cheilodactylidae, traditionally classified as members of the genus Cheilodactylus, classified by some authorities as a genus within the family Latridae.
    - Red morwong (Cheilodactylus (Morwong) fuscus) a species of fish in the clade Morwong.
    - Painted moki (Cheilodactylus (Morwong) ephippium) a species of fish in the clade Morwong.
  - Magpie perch (Cheilodactylus nigripes) a species if fish within the family Cheilodactylidae, traditionally classified as members of the genus Cheilodactylus, classified by some authorities in the monotypic genus Pseudogoniistius within the family Latridae. Also known as the magpie morwong or black-striped morwong.
  - Chirodactylus variegatus, the Peruvian morwong, a species of fish in the clade Chirodactylus, classified by some authorities as a genus within the family Latridae
  - Red moki (Cheilodactylus spectabilis), also known as the banded morwong, a member of the clade Chirodactylus, classified by some authorities as a genus within the family Latridae
  - Dusky morwong, (Dactylophora nigricans), a species of fish, classified by some authorities within the family Latridae.
  - Nemadactylus, a genus of fishes in which some members have common names including "morwong", traditionally classifies as belonging to the family Cheilodactlyidae but classified by some authorities within the family Latridae.
    - Porae (Nemadactylus douglasii) which has a variety of common names which include "morwong"
- Lethrinus nebulosus, the spangled emperor fish, a spariform fish belonging to the family Lethrinidae which has the colloquial name morwong.
- Painted sweetlips (Diagramma picta), a grunt from the family Haemulidae which has the colloquial name morwong.
- Plectorhinchus flavomaculatus, the lemonfish, a grunt from the family Haemulidae which has the colloquial name morwong.
- Aplodactylus westralis, the Western sea carp, a marblefish, which has the alternative common name of cockatoo morwong.
