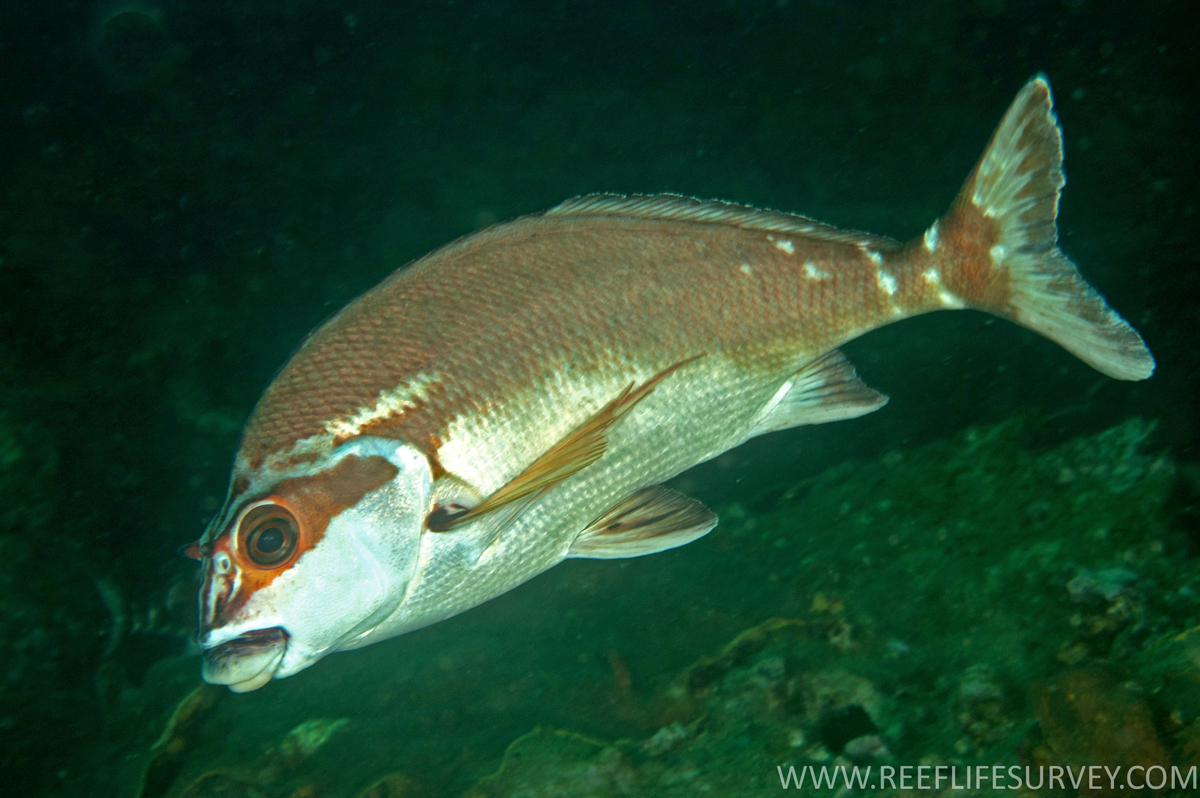

Scientific classification
- Kingdom: Animalia
- Phylum: Chordata
- Class: Actinopterygii
- Order: Centrarchiformes
- Family: Cheilodactylidae
- Genus: Cheilodactylus
- Subgenus: Morwong
- Species: C. fuscus

Binomial name
- Cheilodactylus fuscus Castelnau, 1879

Synonyms
- Morwong fuscus (Castelnau, 1879); Goniistius fuscus (Castelnau, 1879); Cheilodactylus annularis Castelnau, 1879

= Red morwong =

Species of fish

The red morwong (Cheilodactylus (Morwong) fuscus), also known as the sea carp, is a species of marine ray finned fish traditionally regarded as belonging to the family Cheilodactylidae, the members of which are commonly known as morwongs. It is found off southeast Australia and the North Island of New Zealand from shallow depths to at least 55 m, on rocky reef and coastal areas. Its length is between 30 and 60 cm.

== Taxonomy ==
The red morwong was first formally described in 1879 by the French naturalist Francis de La Porte Castelnau with the type locality given as Sydney market. The Australian ichthyologist Gilbert Percy Whitley created the genus Morwong this species was its only member and so was the type species of the genus by monotypy. The specific name fuscus means “dusky”, thought to be the colour of specimens preserved in spirit.

The true taxonomic relationships of the taxa traditionally classified under the family Cheilodactylidae have been considered uncertain and to have been poorly supported by some authorities over a long period of time. Genetic and morphological analyses now strongly suggest that the traditional classification of Cheilodactylus is incorrect and that the inclusion of the species other than the two southern African species in Cheilodactylus, C. fasciatus and C. pixi, make the genus Cheilodactylus sensu lato paraphyletic and that all the other “morwongs” were closer to the Latridae. In these analyses the Red Morwong and the painted moki (C. (M.) ephippium) were found to be sister species and were placed within the clade Morwong.

== Description ==
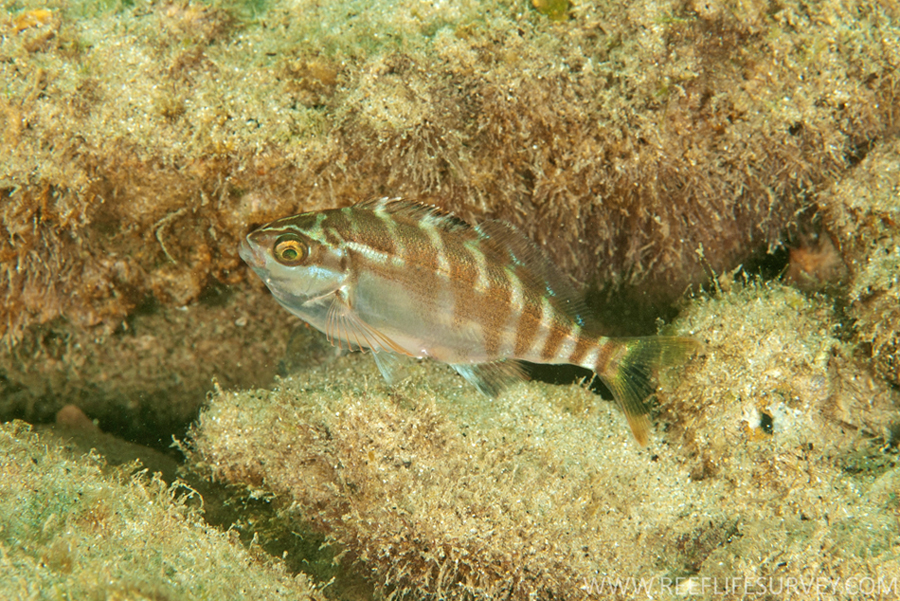
A juvenile Red Morwong, Morwong fuscus, at Red Rock Estuary, Coffs Harbour, New South Wales

The red morwong has a relatively short and deep and compressed body, its depth being 39-45% of its standard length. It has a moderately sized head and a steeply sloped back. There are two pairs of bony protuberances in the adults, a pair on tip of snout immediately above upper lip and a second pair to the front of eyes. It has quite small eyes and a small mouth which does not extend as far back as the eyes. The lips are thick and fleshy and there is a wide band small, pointed tee at the front of each jaw, tapering to a single row at the sides. The low dorsal fin is continuous with long base, originating above the rear margin of the preoperculum. It contains 17 spines and 30-34 soft rays. There only a slight notch between spiny and soft rayed parts, The soft rayed part is uniform in height, the soft rays being a little taller than the rearmost spine. The anal fin is triangular in shape with a short base and its centre is underneath the soft rayed part of the dorsal fin. The anal fin has 3 spines and 8 soft rays. The caudal fin is forked, both lobes having rounded tips. The pectoral fin is of moderate size, the upper rays are branched while the lower rays simple and robust, the highest 2-3of the simple rays are extended and extend to just past the origin of anal fin. The pelvic fins are small, and are placed noticeably lower and to the rear of the origin of the pectoral-fin. This species attains a maximum total length of 65 cm (26 in). This fish is reddish-brown dorsally with a light coloured cheek and abdomen. There are white bars in front of and on the shallow caudal peduncle and on the caudal fin. The eyes have white marking on the space between them and above each eye. The pectoral fin bases have dark spots while the fins themselves are pale pink and the other fins are light in colour with pale with wide dark margins and a thin white outer edge. Individuals fade to completely light coloured with around 7 to 8 dark blotches or bars along the middle of the flanks. The juveniles are pale with clear bands.

== Distribution and habitat ==
The red morwong is found only in the south western Pacific Ocean. In Australia its range extends from Bundaberg in Queensland south as far as Mallacoota in Victoria, it may even reach as far west in Victoria as Cape Conran. It is also found at Lord Howe Island in the Tasman Sea. In addition it is found in the north east of the North Island of New Zealand. The adults are typically seen in schools on rocky reefs at depths down to approximately 30 m (98 ft). The juveniles can be found on reefs cloaked in algae.

== Biology ==
The red morwong is wholly carnivorous and it preys on benthic invertebrates such as polychaetes, brachyurans, amphipods, gastropods and bivalves all year. However, the relative proportions of prey types consumed are very variable from season to season. They have a patchy distribution within their rock reef habitats with the fishes forming aggregations of 3 to 100 fish. Within these aggregations each fish will have a home range over which it forages, and it will return to that home range if caught and released nearby. The aggregations disperse at night as the individual fishes seek shelter within the reef. Peak activity occurs at dawn and dusk for this crepuscular species. The aggregations are larger in the non-breeding season. The red morwong shows some sexual dimorphism, with males having larger protuberances on the head compared to females.

== Fisheries ==
Red morwong are taken by spearfishers but they are territorial and slow growing and could be easily overfished.

As at 2021, the catch limit in New South Wales is five red morwong per person per day, each having minimum length 30 cm; and in Victoria, the limit is a combined total 5 of any "morwong" species, with a minimum length of 23 cm.
