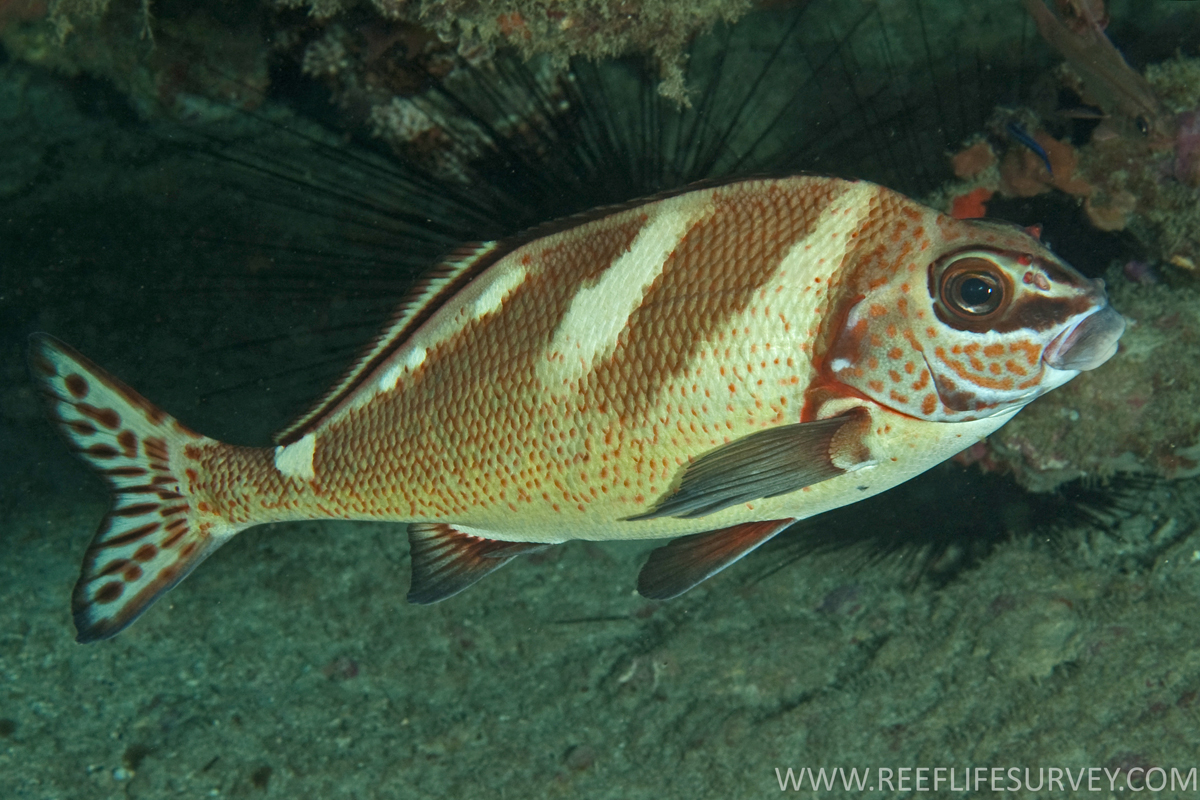

Scientific classification
- Kingdom: Animalia
- Phylum: Chordata
- Class: Actinopterygii
- Order: Centrarchiformes
- Family: Cheilodactylidae
- Genus: Cheilodactylus
- Subgenus: Morwong
- Species: C. ephippium

Binomial name
- Cheilodactylus ephippium McCulloch & Waite, 1916

Synonyms
- Morwong ephippium (McCulloch & Waite, 1916); Goniistius ephippium (McCulloch & Waite, 1916)

= Painted moki =

Species of fish

The painted moki (Cheilodactylus (Morwong) ephippium), also known as the painted morwong, is a species of marine ray-finned fish, traditionally regarded as belonging to the family Cheilodactylidae, the members of which are commonly known as morwongs. It is found in the southwestern Pacific Ocean.

== Taxonomy ==
The painted moki was first formally described as Cheilodactylus ephippium in 1916 by the Australian ichthyologists Allan Riverstone McCulloch and Edgar Ravenswood Waite with the type locality given as Norfolk Island. The specific name epphipium means "saddle", an allusion which McCulloch and Waite did not explain but may be a reference to the bar behind the head.

The true taxonomic relationships of the taxa traditionally classified under the family Cheilodactylidae have been considered uncertain and to have been poorly supported by some authorities over a long period of time. Genetic and morphological analyses now strongly suggest that the traditional classification of Cheilodactylus is incorrect and that the inclusion of the species other than the two southern African species in Cheilodactylus, C. fasciatus and C. pixi, make the genus Cheilodactylus sensu lato paraphyletic and that all the other "morwongs" were closer to the Latridae. In these analyses the painted moki was found to be the sister species of the red morwong (C. (M.) fuscus) and so was placed within the clade Morwong.

== Description ==
The painted moki reaches a maximum length of 55 cm (22 in). The colour of this fish is basically reddish-brown to brown with irregular spotting. There is a wide light coloured oblique bar running from the nape to behind the base of the pectoral fin and joining with the pale underside. There is another shorter bar from underneath the spiny part of the dorsal fin to immediately below the centre of the body. A series of light coloured spots or a wide pale stripe run along the back from the base of the soft rayed part of the dorsal-fin.

== Distribution, habitat and biology ==
The painted moki is found in the southwestern Pacific Ocean. Off New South Wales it is found from Broughton Island south to Montague Island. In the Tasman Sea it is found at Lord Howe Island and Norfolk Island and in New Zealand it is found off the Kermadec Islands. This species is found at depths down to 60 m (200 ft) on inshore rocky and coral reefs. This species feeds on benthic invertebrates which it filters out of the sediment.
