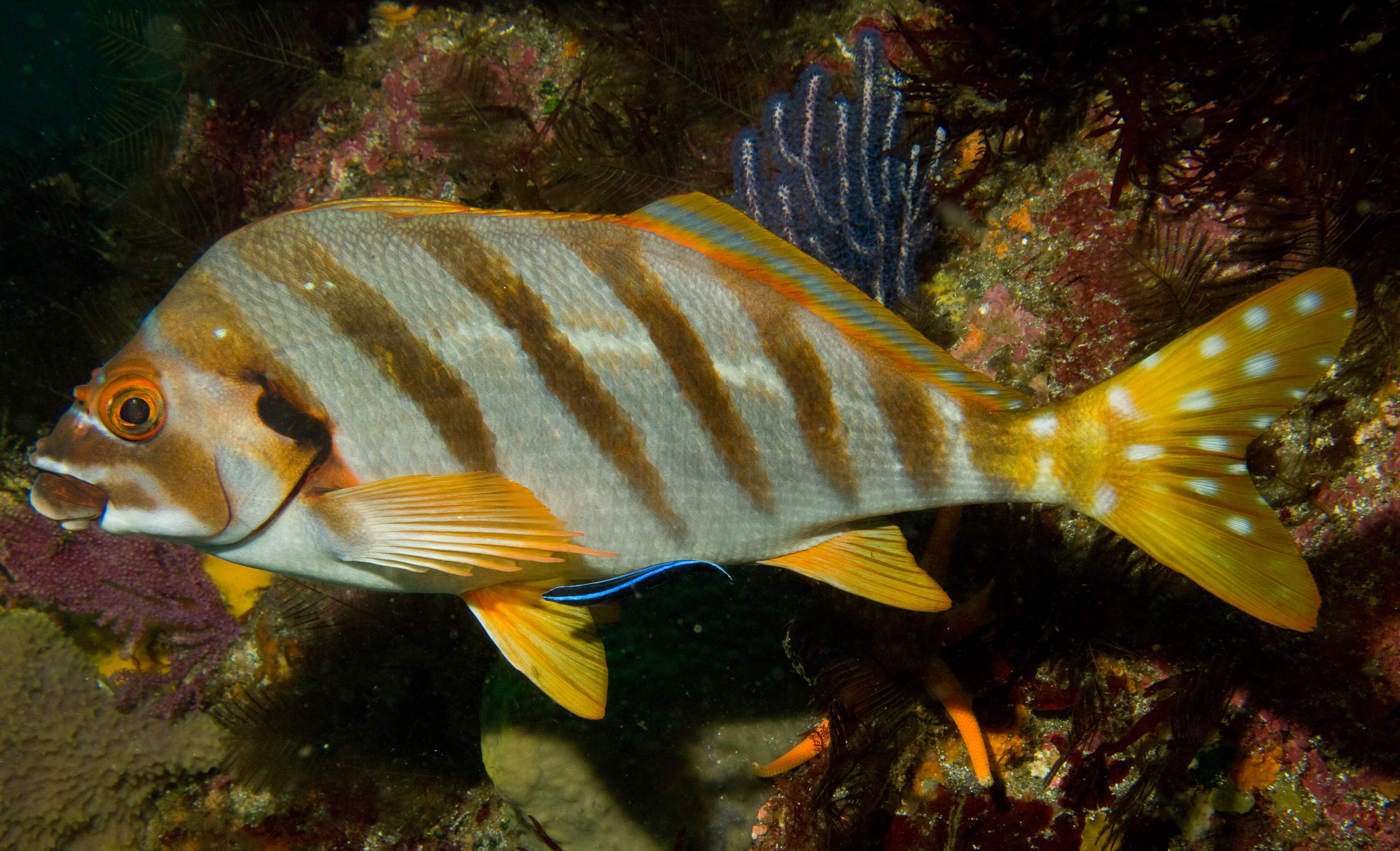

Scientific classification
- Kingdom: Animalia
- Phylum: Chordata
- Class: Actinopterygii
- Order: Centrarchiformes
- Family: Cheilodactylidae
- Genus: Cheilodactylus
- Subgenus: Goniistius
- Species: C. zonatus

Binomial name
- Cheilodactylus zonatus Cuvier, 1830

= Spottedtail morwong =

Species of fish

The spottedtail morwong (Cheilodactylus (Goniistius) zonatus) is a species of marine ray-finned fish, traditionally regarded as belonging to the family Cheilodactylidae, the members of which are commonly known as morwongs. It is found in the northwest Pacific Ocean.

== Taxonomy ==
The spottedtail morwong was first formally described in 1830 by the French zoologist Georges Cuvier as a new name for Labrus japonicus of Tilesius, Cuvier referred to “Les Cheilodactyls” rather the referring to the genus Cheilodactylus. When Theodore Nicholas Gill described the subgenus Goniistius he designated Cheilodactylus zonatus as its type species. The specific name zonatus means “banded”, a reference to the banded pattern on this fish's body.

Genetic and morphological analyses have strongly suggested that the genus Cheilodactylus was paraphyletic and that only two species, C. fasciatus and C. pixi, both from Southern Africa could be included in a monophyletic genus Cheilodactylus. Further, these analyses also found that other than these two species the rest of the taxa traditionally classified in the family are actually closer to the Latridae and should be classified in that family.

== Description ==
The spottedtail morwong attains a maximum total length of 45 cm (18 in). The overall colour of the body and head is white marked with by several diagonal reddish orange bands, the caudal fin has white spots.

== Distribution and habitat ==
The spottedtail morwong is found in the northwestern Pacific Ocean from Japan and Korea south to southern China, Taiwan and northern Vietnam. It lives on rocky reef faces and slopes and is typically recorded from depths of 1 to 15 m (3 ft 3 in to 49 ft 3 in).

== Biology ==
The spottedtail morwong feeds on benthic invertebrates that it filters from the substrate. They have been observed feeding in benthic mats of diatoms, taking mouthfuls of diatoms and using the gill rakers to filter out any animals among the algae. These fish defend feeding territories from conspecifics of similar size.

== Utilisation ==
The spottedtail morwong is used In mariculture in Japan.
