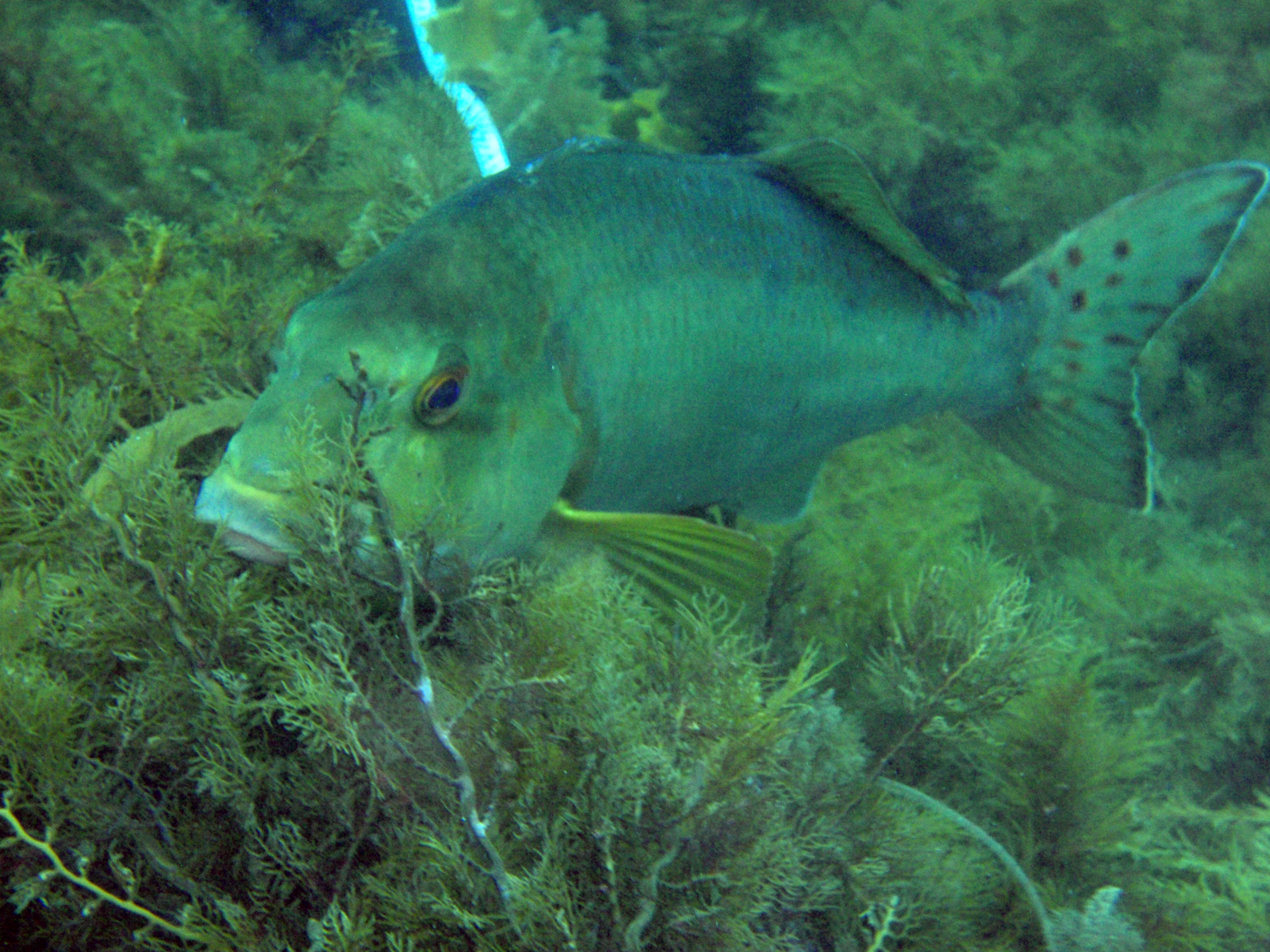

Scientific classification
- Kingdom: Animalia
- Phylum: Chordata
- Class: Actinopterygii
- Order: Centrarchiformes
- Family: Latridae
- Genus: Dactylophora; De Vis, 1883
- Species: D. nigricans

Binomial name
- Dactylophora nigricans (J. Richardson, 1850)

Synonyms
- Cheilodactylus nigricans Richardson, 1850; Psilocranium nigricans (Richardson, 1850)

= Dusky morwong =

Species of fish

The dusky morwong (Dactylophora nigricans) is a species of marine ray-finned fish, traditionally regarded as belonging to the family Cheilodactylidae, the members of which are commonly known as morwongs. It is native to the western and southern coastal reefs of Australia. This species is the only known member of its genus.

== Taxonomy ==
The dusky morwong was first formally described in 1850 as Cheilodactylus nigricans by the Scottish naval surgeon, arctic explorer and naturalist Sir John Richardson with the type locality given as King George Sound in Western Australia. In 1883 the English zoologist Charles De Vis created the genus Dactylophora with this species the type species by monotypy, it is still the only species in the genus. The genus name is a compound of dactylus meaning "finger" and phora which means "to bear" or "carry", a reference to the single elongated, unbranched pectoral fin ray. The specific namenigricans means "blackish", as the species description was based on a drawing which showed a dark greyish-black colour on the back, head and fins.

Genetic and morphological analyses strongly suggest that Dactylophora should be placed in the family Latridae, along with almost all of the other species formerly classified in the Cheilodactylidae. Only two Southern African species, Cheilodactylus fasciatus and C. pixi would remain in Cheilodactylidae. The 5th edition of Fishes of the World, however, retains Dactylophora within the family Cheiloactylidae.

== Description ==
Dusky morwong adults are greyish to brownish grey on the upper body and whitish ventrally. The subadults are silvery with lines of orangish spots on the flanks and dark spots on the dorsal and caudal fins. The juveniles have deeper bodies which are silvery marked with dark bands on the upper flanks extending upwards onto the dorsal fin. This is a large species which attains a maximum total length of 120 cm (47 in).

== Distribution and habitat ==
The dusky morwong is endemic to southern Australia where it occurs from the Houtman Abrolhos in Western Australia to the Clarence River in New South Wales, and around Tasmania. They are found at depths of 1 to 30 m (3 ft 3 in to 98 ft 5 in) on rocky reefs, in seagrass beds or over soft sediments. The larvae prefer seagrass beds.

== Biology ==
The dusky morwong feeds on benthic invertebrates such as polychaetes, isopods and amphipods, as well as brown algae.
