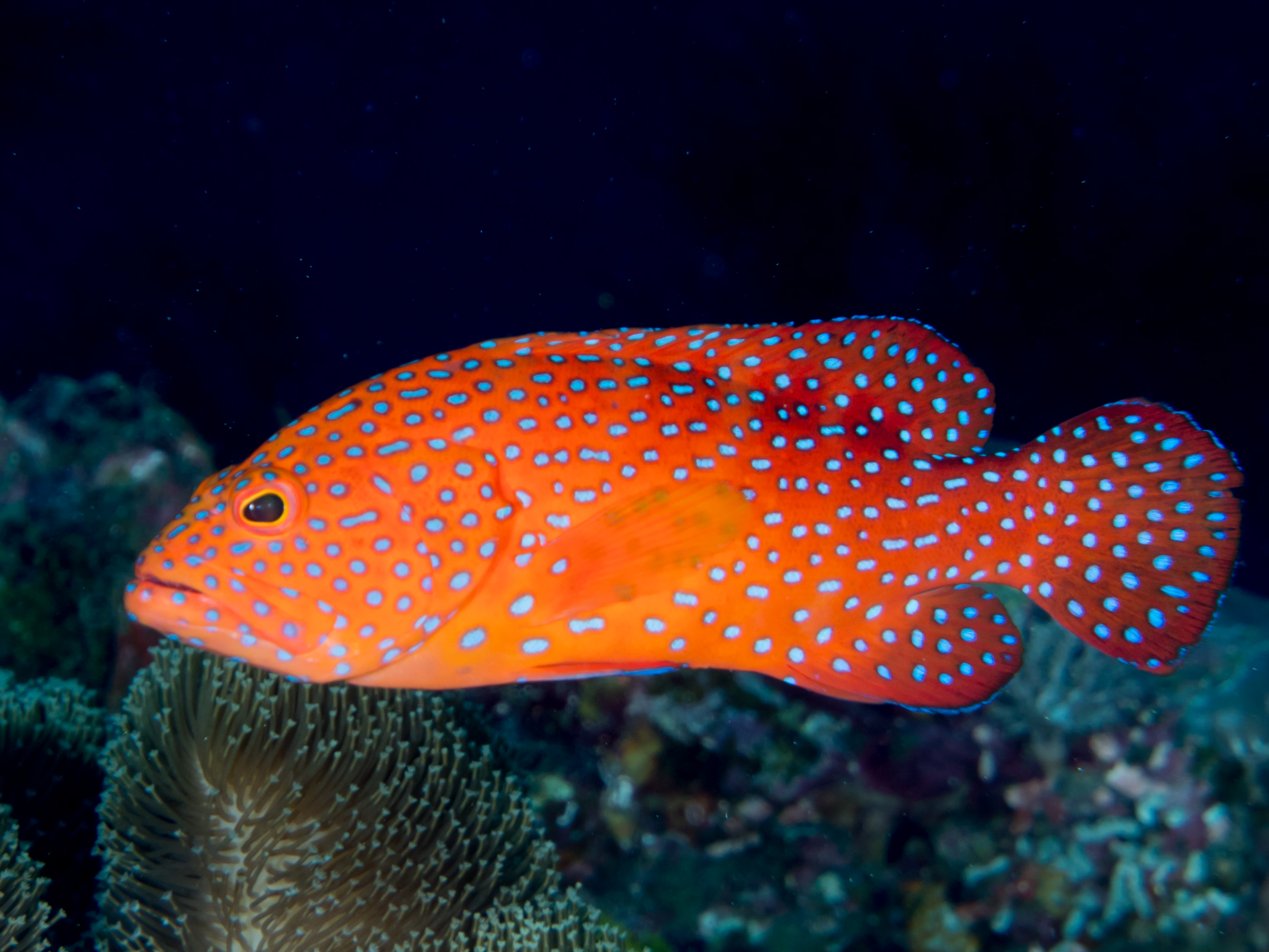
- Coral grouper (Cephalopholis miniata)
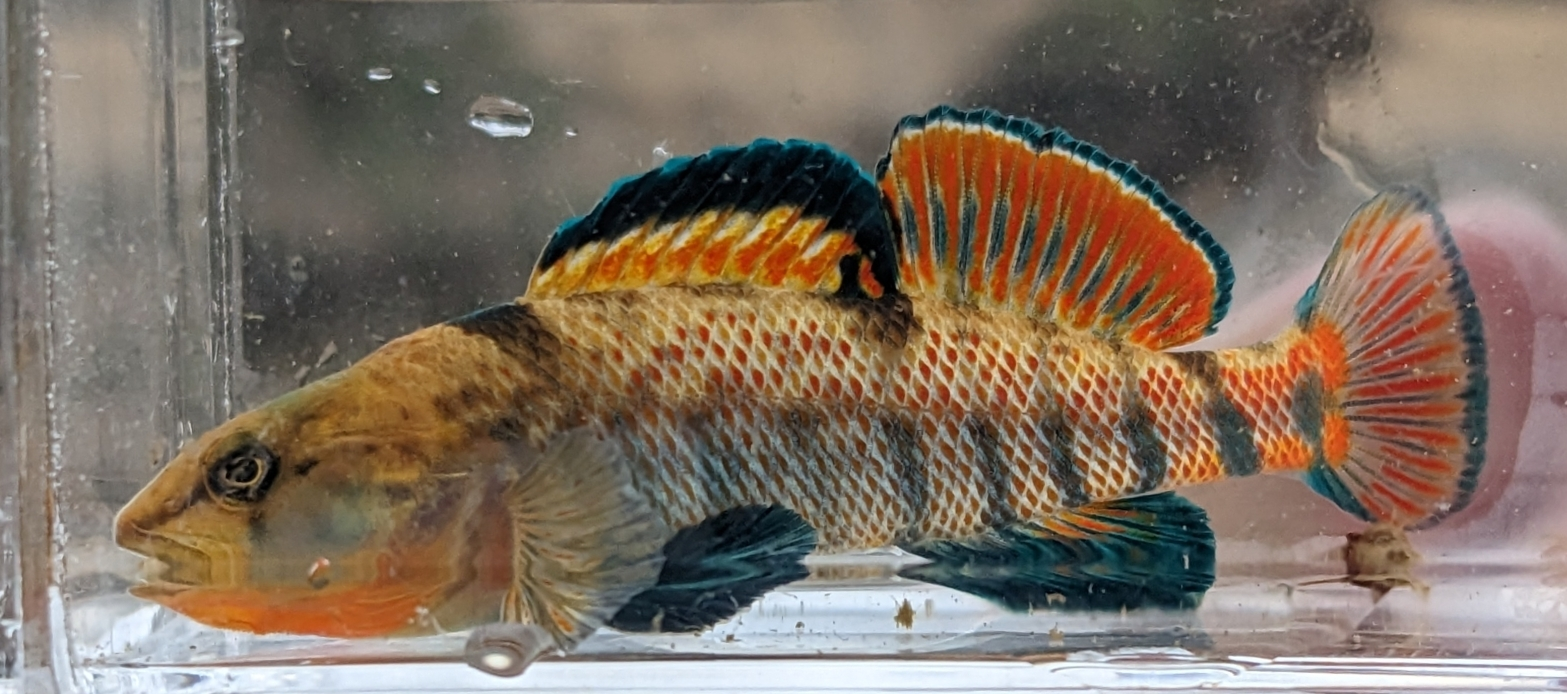
- Rainbow darter (Etheostoma caeruleum)

Scientific classification
- Kingdom: Animalia
- Phylum: Chordata
- Class: Actinopterygii
- Division: Teleostei
- Order: Perciformes
- Suborder: Percoidei

Superfamilies
- see text

= Percoidei =

Suborder of fishes

Percoidei is a suborder of bony fishes in the order Perciformes. Many commercially harvested fish species are considered to be contained in this suborder, including the groupers, seabasses and perches.

== Divisions ==
The following classification is based on Eschmeyer's Catalog of Fishes:

- Suborder Percoidei
  - Family Trachypomatidae Menkara, Tea, Gill & Ho 2026 (toadstool groupers)
  - Family Acanthistiidae Fowler, 1951 (wirrahs)
  - Family Niphonidae Jordan, 1923 (Ara groupers)
  - Family Percidae Rafinesque, 1815 (perches and darters)
    - Subfamily Percinae Rafinesque, 1815
    - Subfamily Luciopercinae Jordan & Evermann, 1896
    - Subfamily Etheostomatinae Agassiz, 1850
  - Family Epinephelidae Bleeker, 1874 (groupers)
  - Family Liopropomatidae Poey, 1867 (painted basslets)
    - Subfamily Liopropomatinae Poey, 1867
    - Subfamily Diploprioninae Bleeker, 1874
  - Family Grammistidae Bleeker, 1857 (soapfishes)
  - Family Serranidae Swainson, 1839 (sea basses)
  - Family Anthiadidae Poey, 1861 (fairy basslets or streamer basses)
  - Family Trachinidae Rafinesque, 1815 (weeverfishes)
  - Family Bembropidae Regan, 1913 (flatheads or duckbill flatheads)

The species in the family Grammistidae and the liopropomatid subfamily Diploprioninae secrete a mucus-like toxin in their skin called grammistin, and when they are confined in a restricted space and subjected to stress, the mucus produces a foam that is toxic to nearby fish. These fishes are often called soapfishes.

=== Former classification ===
Until recently, the Percoidei had a much more expanded treatment containing many different morphologically similar families. However, such a treatment is now known to be polyphyletic.

- Suborder Percoidei
  - Percoidea
    - Centropomidae (Snooks)
    - Latidae (Lates)
    - Gerreidae (Mojarras)
    - Centrogenyidae (False scorpionfishes)
    - Perciliidae (Southern basses)
    - Howellidae (Oceanic basslets)
    - Acropomatidae (Lanternbellies)
    - Epigonidae (Deepwater cardinalfishes)
    - Polyprionidae (Wreckfishes)
    - Lateolabracidae (Asian seaperches)
    - Mullidae (Goatfishes)
    - Glaucosomatidae (Pearl perches)
    - Pempheridae (Sweepers)
    - Oplegnathidae (Knifejaws)
    - Kuhliidae (Flagtails)
    - Leptobramidae (Beachsalmon)
    - Bathyclupeidae (Bathyclupeids)
    - Polynemidae (Threadfins)
    - Toxotidae (Archerfishes)
    - Arripidae (Australasian salmon (kahawai))
    - Dichistiidae (Galjoen fishes)
    - Kyphosidae (Sea chubs)
    - Terapontidae (grunters or tigerperches)
    - Percichthyidae (temperate perches)
    - Sinipercidae (Chinese perches)
    - Enoplosidae (Oldwives)
    - Pentacerotidae (Armourheads)
    - Dinopercidae (Cavebasses)
    - Banjosiidae (Banjofishes)
    - Centrarchidae (Sunfishes)
    - Serranidae (Sea basses)
    - Percidae (Perches)
    - Lactariidae (False trevallies)
    - Dinolestidae (Long-finned pikes)
    - Scombropidae (Gnomefishes)
    - Pomatomidae (Bluefishes)
    - Bramidae (Pomfrets)
    - Caristiidae (Manefishes)
  - Possibly related to Acanthuriformes
    - Monodactylidae (Moonfishes)
    - Priacanthidae (Bigeyes (catalufas))
  - Seven families which may have a relationship to Acanthuroidei, Monodactylidae, and Priacanthidae
    - Leiognathidae (Ponyfishes, slimys, or slipmouths)
    - Chaetodontidae (Butterflyfishes)
    - Pomacanthidae (Angelfishes)
    - Malacanthidae (Tilefishes)
    - Haemulidae (Grunts)
    - Hapalogenyidae (Barbeled grunters)
    - Lutjanidae (Snappers)
    - Caesionidae (Fusiliers)
  - Superfamily Cirrhitoidea
    - Cirrhitidae (Hawkfishes)
    - Chironemidae (Kelpfishes)
    - Aplodactylidae (Marblefishes)
    - Cheilodactylidae (Morwongs)
    - Latridae (Trumpeters)
  - Superfamily Cepoloidea
    - Cepolidae (Bandfishes)
  - Superfamily Siganoidea
    - Scatophagidae (Scats)
    - Siganidae (Rabbitfishes)
  - incertae sedis
    - † Labrax Pallas 1810
      - † L. lepidotus Agassiz 1836
      - † L. major Agassiz 1836
      - † L. schizurus Agassiz 1835
      - † L. vogdtii Bogatshov 1942
