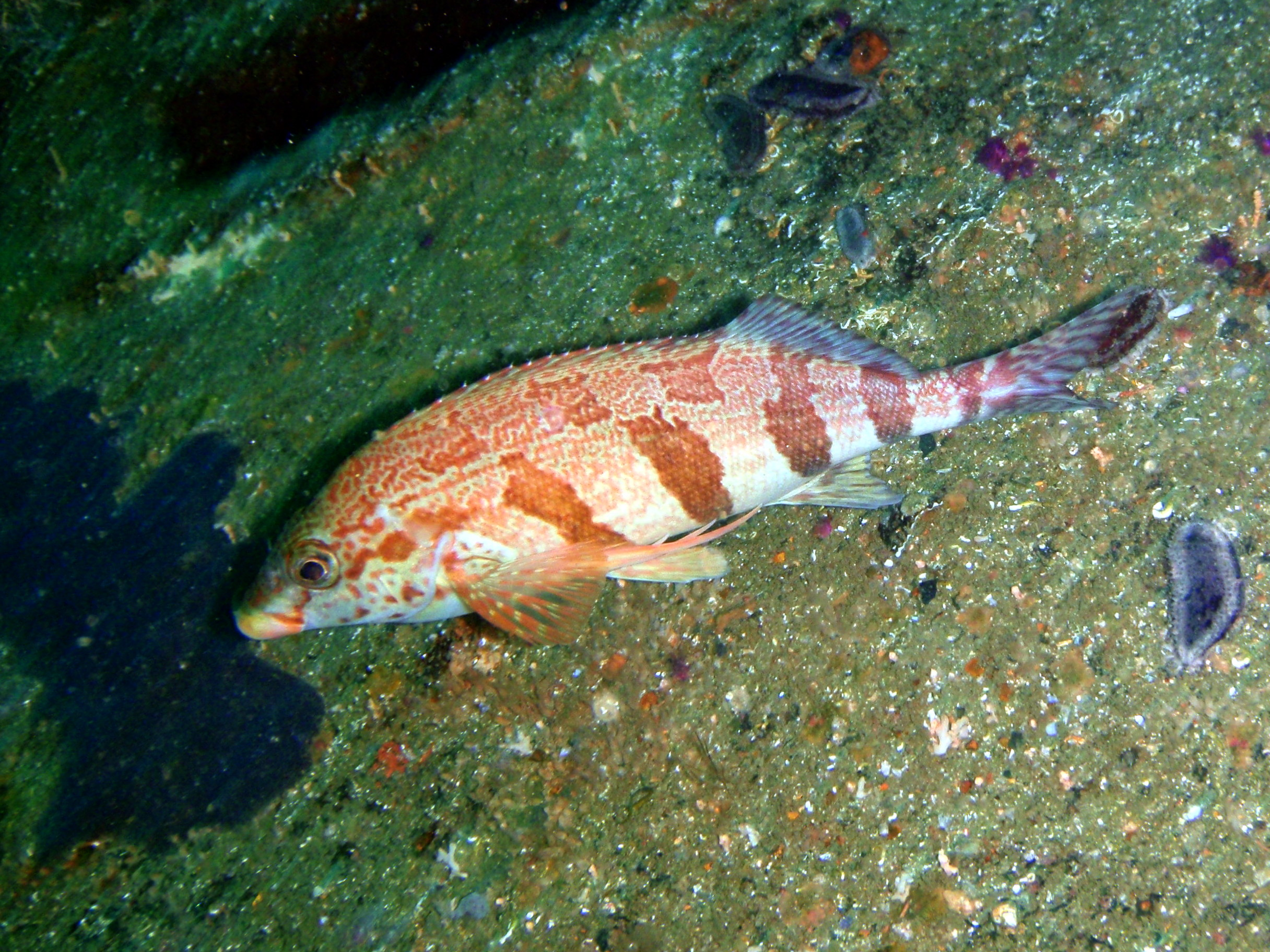
- Cheilodactylus fasciatus

Scientific classification
- Kingdom: Animalia
- Phylum: Chordata
- Class: Actinopterygii
- Division: Teleostei
- Order: Centrarchiformes
- Family: Cheilodactylidae
- Genus: Cheilodactylus; Lacépède, 1803

Type species
- Cheilodactylus fasciatus Lacépède, 1803

Synonyms
- Pteronemus Van der Hoeven, 1855; Trichopterus Gronow, 1854

= Cheilodactylus =

Genus of fishes

Cheilodactylus is a genus of marine ray-finned fishes belonging to the family Cheilodactylidae, known as morwongs, although this name is not unique to this family. They are found in the temperate waters of the southern hemisphere and in the North Pacific Ocean.

== Taxonomy ==
Cheilodactylus was first formally described in 1803 by the French naturalist Bernard Germain de Lacépède when he described Cheilodactylus fasciatus which was its type species by monotypy.

The traditional delimitation of the families Cheilodactlidae and Latridae is based on morphological differences, but the reliability of these differences has been called into doubt, and a phylogenetic analyses and genetics have not supported this arrangement. This has led to some authorities suggesting that the majority of species in Cheilodactylidae should be placed in Latridae. A result of this rearrangement is that the only species which would remain in Cheilodactylidae are Cheilodactylus fasciatus and C. pixi from southern Africa. This is because these analyses resolved the genus Cheilodactylus as polyphyletic. These studies appear to show that most of the species in Cheilodactylus sensu lato instead apparently to belong in several different genera and are not even members of the same family, but how many and their exact delimitation is not clear at present. The outlier species have been assigned to Chirodactylus, Goniistius, Morwong and Pseudogoniistius, but DNA and morphologic analyses found those species to be nested within Latridae and more derived than the kelpfish, marblefish and the Cheilodactylus type species C. fasciatus.

The name of the genus is a compound of cheilos meaning “lip”, a reference to the thick, fleshy lips of the adults, and daktylos which means “finger”, a reference to the elongated lower rays on the pectoral fins.

== Species ==
The genus Cheilodactylus sensu lato includes sixteen species, this list shows the genera they have been assigned to under the proposed revised taxonomy:

- Cheilodactylus
  - Cheilodactylus fasciatus Lacépède, 1803 (Redfingers)
  - Cheilodactylus pixi M. M. Smith, 1980 (Barred fingerfin)
- Chirodactylus
  - Cheilodactylus spectabilis F. W. Hutton, 1872 (Red moki)
- Goniistius
  - Cheilodactylus francisi C. P. Burridge, 2004 (Blacktip morwong)
  - Cheilodactylus gibbosus J. Richardson, 1841 (Western crested morwong)
  - Cheilodactylus plessisi J. E. Randall, 1983 (Plessis' morwong)
  - Cheilodactylus quadricornis Günther, 1860
  - Cheilodactylus rubrolabiatus G. R. Allen & Heemstra, 1976
  - Cheilodactylus vestitus (Castelnau, 1879) (Crested morwong)
  - Cheilodactylus vittatus A. Garrett, 1864 (Hawaiian morwong)
  - Cheilodactylus zebra Döderlein (de), 1883 (Redlip morwong)
  - Cheilodactylus zonatus G. Cuvier, 1830 (Spottedtail morwong)
- Morwong
  - Cheilodactylus fuscus Castelnau, 1879 (Red morwong)
  - Cheilodactylus ephippium McCulloch & Waite, 1916 (Painted moki)
- Pseudogoniistius
  - Cheilodactylus nigripes J. Richardson, 1850 (Magpie perch)
