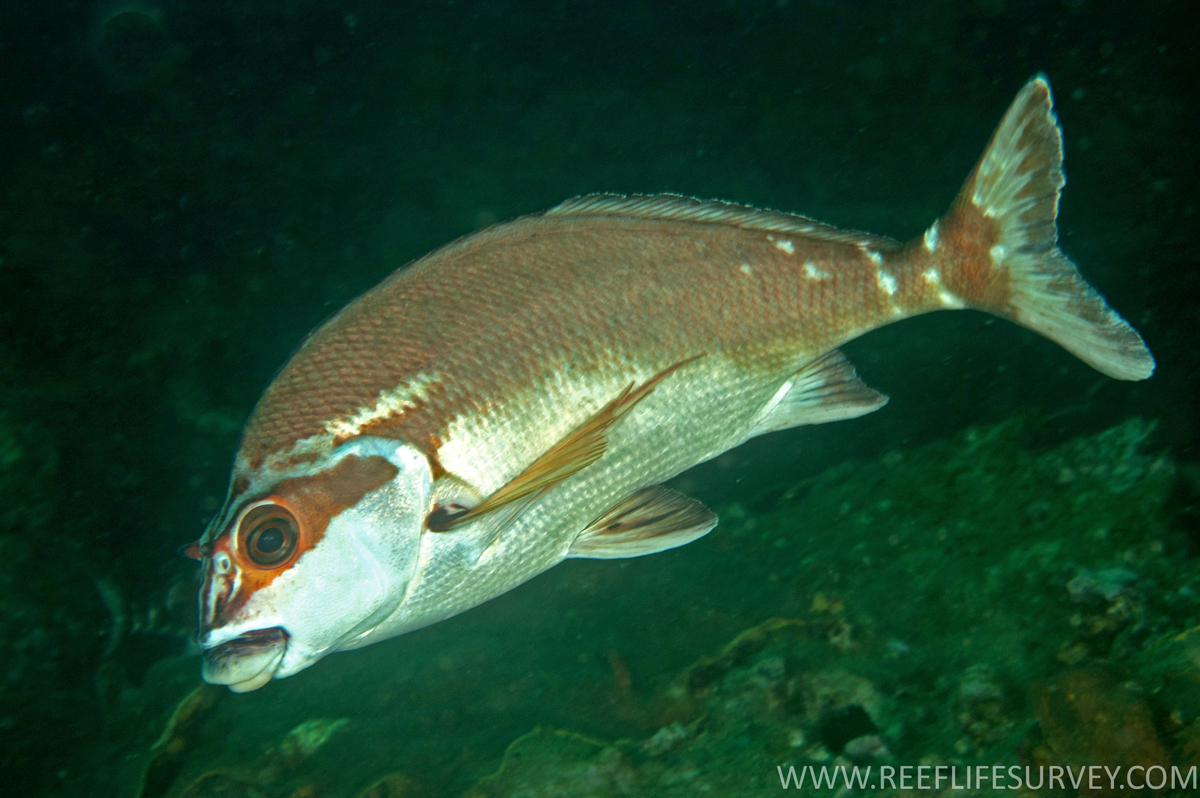
- Red morwong Cheilodactylus (Morwong) fuscus

Scientific classification
- Kingdom: Animalia
- Phylum: Chordata
- Class: Actinopterygii
- Division: Teleostei
- Order: Centrarchiformes
- Family: Cheilodactylidae
- Genus: Cheilodactylus
- Subgenus: Morwong; Whitley, 1957

Type species
- Cheilodactylus fuscus Castelnau, 1879

= Morwong (genus) =

Genus of fishes

Morwong is a genus of marine ray-finned fish traditionally classified as a subgenus within the genus Cheilodactylus and as belonging to the family Cheilodactylidae found in oceans off Australia and New Zealand. They were formerly included in the genus Cheilodactylus in family Cheilodactylidae, but based on genetic and morphological analyses they have strongly suggested that the genus Morwong is a valid genus and should be placed in the family Latridae.

== Taxonomy ==
Morwong was first used as a name for a genus in 1957 when the Australian ichthyologist Gilbert Percy Whitley designated Cheilodactylus fuscus as its type species by monotypy. It was, however, traditionally regarded as synonymous with Cheilodactylus. The genus name is the name in Australian English, the origins of which are unknown, for a number of similar fish species, mostly in the families Cheilodactylidae and Latridae.

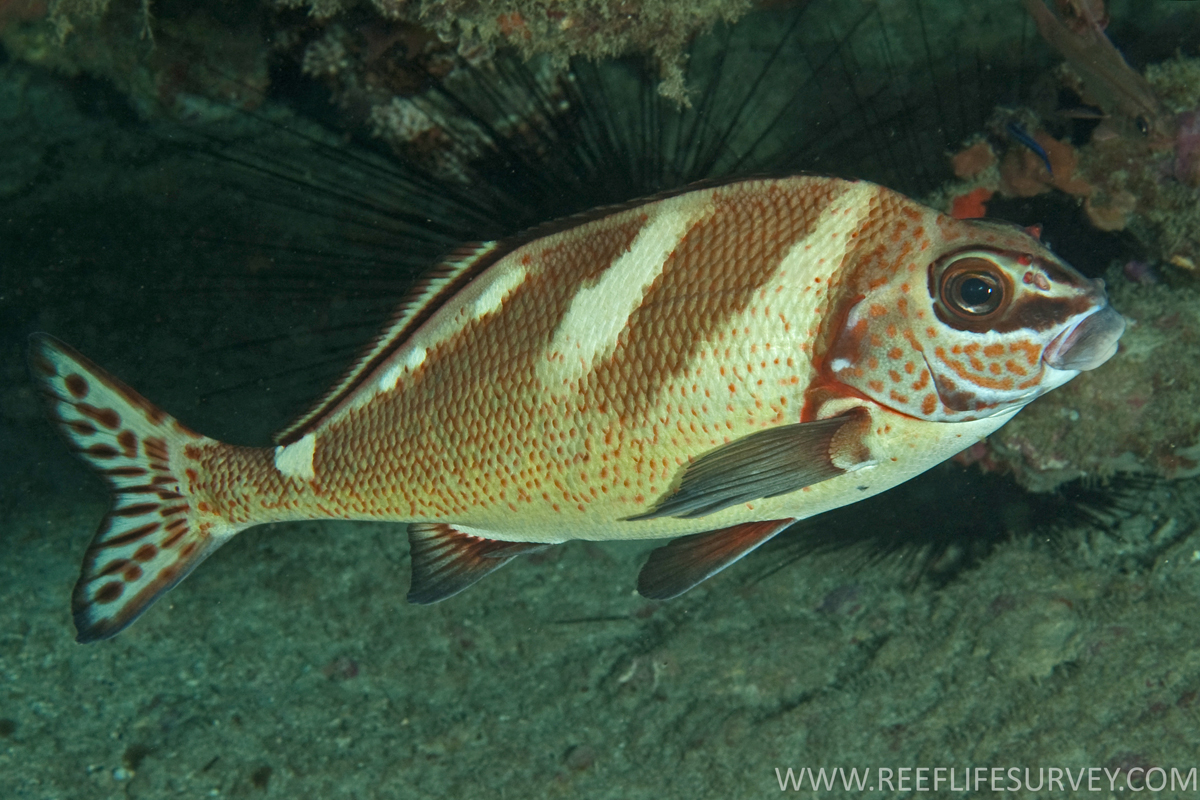
Painted moki (Cheilodactylus (Morwong) ephippium)

Although the red morwong has usually been assigned to Cheilodactylus, DNA studies published in the early 2000s recovered Cheilodactylus fuscus as closer to Nemadactylus than to the Cheilodactylus type species. In the meantime, John E. Randall has recommended using the generic name Morwong for C. fuscus. In this case, Cheilodactylus ephippum would also become a referred species of Morwong, as M. ephippum, because Burridge and White (2000) and Burridge and Smolenski (2004) recovered it as sister to the red morwong. Genetic and morphological analyses have also strongly suggested that only two southern African species in Cheilodactylus, C. fasciatus and C. pixi, make up a monophyletic clade and that all the other “morwongs” were closer to the Latridae.

== Species ==
There are two recognized species in this clade:

- Morwong ephippium (McCulloch & Waite, 1916) – painted moki
- Morwong fuscus (Castelnau, 1879) – red morwong

== Characteristics ==
Morwong is distinguished from related taxa by having 16-18 spines and 30-35 soft rays in the dorsal fin while the anal fin has 3 spines and 8-9 soft rays. They have 13-14 pectoral fin rays with the lowest 5-6 being simple and robust. They are generally brown or red in colour. They have maximum lengths of 55 cm (22 in) for M. epphipium and 65 cm (26 in) for M. fuscus. Compared to Goniistius Morwong has a shallower head and a shorter 4th dorsal fin spine while compared to Chirodactylus they have a greater number of scales along the lateral line, 59–66 as opposed to 46–56, and a higher number of soft rays in the dorsal fin, 30–35 as opposed to 22–31.

== Distribution, habitat and biology ==
Morwong fishes are found in the southwestern Pacific Ocean in southeastern Australia, the Tasman Sea and northern New Zealand. These fishes inhabit rocky substrates where they feed on benthic invertebrates.
