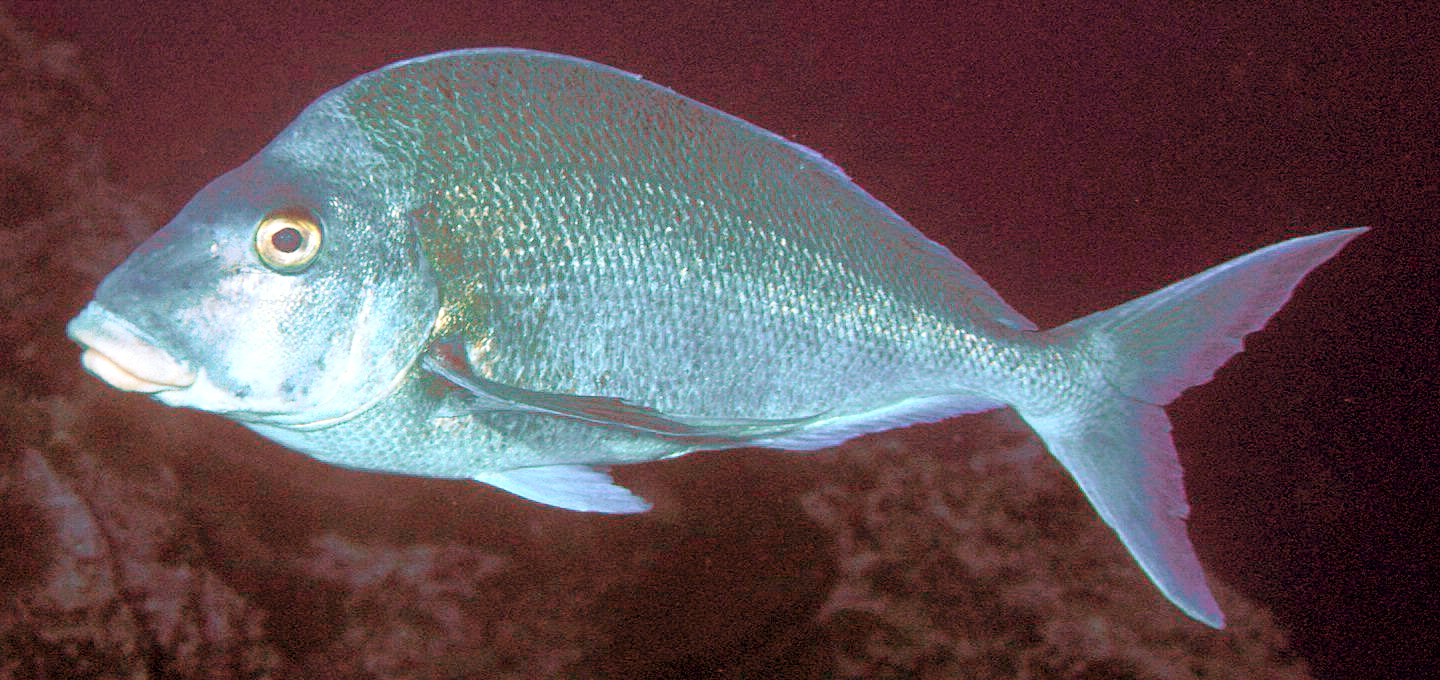

Scientific classification
- Kingdom: Animalia
- Phylum: Chordata
- Class: Actinopterygii
- Order: Centrarchiformes
- Family: Latridae
- Genus: Nemadactylus
- Species: N. douglasii

Binomial name
- Nemadactylus douglasii (Hector, 1875)

Synonyms
- Cheilodactylus douglasii Hector, 1875; Cheilodactylus morwong Ramsay & Ogilby, 1887; Nemadactylus morwong (Ramsay & Ogilby, 1887)

= Porae =

Species of fish

The porae (Nemadactylus douglasii), the grey morwong, blue morwong, butterfish, Douglas' morwong, Eastern blue morwong, great perch, queen snapper, rubberlip morwong or silver morwong, is a species of marine ray-finned fish, traditionally regarded as belonging to the family Cheilodactylidae, the members of which are commonly known as morwongs. It is found around south eastern Australia and the north eastern coast of the North Island of New Zealand at depths of about 10 to 100 metres, on sandy and rocky coasts.

== Taxonomy ==
The porae was first formally described as Cheilodactylus douglasii 1875 by the Scottish-born New Zealand geologist, naturalist and surgeon James Hector with the type localities given as Ngunguru Bay, north of Whangārei and Bay of Islands, Auckland, New Zealand. The specific name honours Sir Robert Andrews Mackenzie Douglas, 3rd Baronet of Douglas of Glenbervie, a former officer in the British Army and New Zealand politician who provided Hector with “kind hospitality” on a “pleasant fishing excursion” at Ngunguru Bay during which he collected some "fine" new specimens. Genetic and morphological analyses strongly support the placement of Nemadactylus in the family Latridae, alongside almost all of the other species formerly classified in the Cheilodactylidae.

== Description ==
The porae has a body which is compressed and moderately short and deep, its depth being around two fifths of its standard length, with a very thin caudal peduncle. It has a moderately sized head which has a shallow dorsal profile and there is a small over the eyes in adults. There are no bony protuberances on the snout or to the front of the moderately sized eyes. It has a small mouth, which does not extend as far as the eyes, with thick and fleshy lips. The teeth are small and pointed and arranged in a single row in each jaw and they are embedded in the lips. There is a patch of smaller teeth to the rear of the main row in the front of the upper jaw. The dorsal fin is continuous, with a long base and only slight demarcation between the spiny part and the soft rayed part which are both of similar length. The spiny part is tallest at the front and decreases in height to the rear while the soft rayed part is of a uniform low height. The anal fin is similar in shape but slightly shorter than soft rayed part of the dorsal fin. The caudal fin is forked with the tips of both lobes bluntly pointed. The pectoral fins are of moderate size with its upper rays branched and its lower rays simple and robust with uppermost of these rays being highly elongated, extending almost to the middle of the anal fin. The pelvic fins are small and are placed obviously under and to the rear of the origin of the pectoral fins. The spiny part of the dorsal fin contains 17-18 spines while the soft rayed part holds 27-28 fin rays, the anal fin has 3 spines and 16-17 soft rays. This species attains a maximum fork length of 81 cm (32 in) and a maximum published weight of 4.0 kg (8.8 lb). The overall colour is silvery, tinged with greenish-blue. or occasionally yellowish dorsally, paler silvery on the lower body. The fins may show a bluish tinge. The juveniles have a dark blotch just below middle of the lateral line, this fades as the fish grows.

== Distribution and habitat ==
The porae is found in the southwestern Pacific Ocean in eastern Australia and New Zealand. In Australia it occurs from Moreton Bay, Queensland, in the north to Wilsons Promontory, Victoria and off eastern Tasmania. In New Zealand it is found around the Kermadec Islands and on the North Island from Three Kings Islands to Kaikōura. It is found at depths down to 200 m (660 ft) over reefs or over sandy areas in the vicinity of reefs. The juveniles are found in shallower waters than the adults.

== Biology ==
The porae is a carnivorous fish, preying on fishes, crustaceans and a variety of benthic invertebrates. They are thought to be a territorial species which maintains a home range. The spawning season in New Zealand is in late summer and the autumn. They are usually observed in small groupos but larger schools are found in deeper waters. Porae are occasionally observed resting on the bottom in the daytime using their long pectoral fin rays to support them. They have also been observed to use their long pectoral fin rays to prevent ectoparasites settling on the body. These fish have an extended period where the young are planktonic post larvae before settling on the seabed when they attain a length of 8 to 10 cm (3.1 to 3.9 in). They may live for 30 years or more but they grow much more slowly after they attain sexual maturity.

== Fisheries ==
The porae is a target for commercial and recreational offshore fisheries in New South Wales where the landings and the mean size of the fish caught in the period from the 1980s to the 2000s suggest that there have been substantial reduction of the stock. Commercial catches in New Zealand are small, and catches halved from the 1990s up to 2008.
