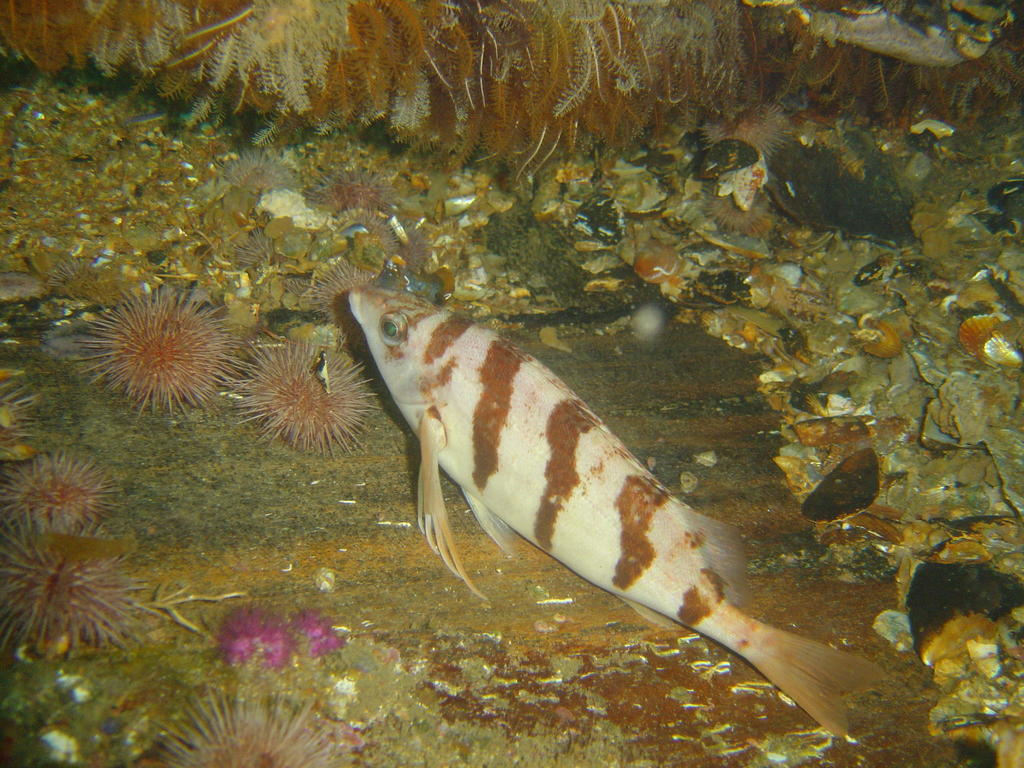

Scientific classification
- Kingdom: Animalia
- Phylum: Chordata
- Class: Actinopterygii
- Order: Centrarchiformes
- Family: Cheilodactylidae
- Genus: Cheilodactylus
- Species: C. pixi

Binomial name
- Cheilodactylus pixi M. M. Smith, 1980

= Barred fingerfin =

Species of fish

The barred fingerfin (Cheilodactylus pixi) is a species of marine ray-finned fish, belonging to the family Cheilodactylidae, commonly referred to as morwongs. It is found only in the southeastern Atlantic and southwestern Indian Oceans off the coasts of South Africa.

== Taxonomy ==
The barred fingerfin was first formally described in 1980 by the South African ichthyologist Margaret Mary Smith with the type locality given as off the mouth of the Kowie River in the Eastern Cape in South Africa. Phylogenetic analyses and genetic studies of the morwongs have not supported the traditional arrangement of the families Cheilodactylidae and Latridae. This has led to some authorities suggesting that the majority of species in Cheilodactylidae should be placed in Latridae. A result of this rearrangement is that the only species which would remain in Cheilodactylidae are this species and C. fasciatus, both from southern Africa. This is because these analyses resolved the genus Cheilodactylus as polyphyletic. These studies appear to show that most of the species in Cheilodactylus sensu lato instead apparently to belong in several different genera and are not even members of the same family, but how many and their exact delimitation is not clear at present. The outlier species have been assigned to Chirodactylus, Goniistius, Morwong and Pseudogoniistius, but DNA and morphologic analyses found those species to be nested within Latridae and more derived than the kelpfish, marblefish and this species. The specific name honours Pixie John who lived in Port Alfred and sent the type specimen to Smith.

== Description ==
The barred fingerfin has a weakly pointed snout and a concave ventral profile. The dorsal fin contains 18-20 spines and 19-23 soft rays while the anal fin has 3 spines and 8-11 soft rays. This species attains a maximum total length of 18 cm (7.1 in). The overall colour of the ody is pale grey with a speckling of pale brown spots and overlain with four clear, diagonal brown bars. There is a fifth more indistinct bar to the back of the head extending to the base of the pectoral fins. The colour of the fins is translucent orange.

== Distribution and habitat ==
The barred fingerfin is endemic to South Africa where it is found from the False Bay to Coffee Bay in KwaZulu Natal. This species can be found along rocky coastlines and on offshore rocky reefs at depths of 5 to 30 m (16 to 98 ft).

== Biology ==
The barred fingerfin feeds on benthic invertebrates. It is a solitary species which is often observed perched on the reef in the daylight hours. It is known to be preyed upon by the copper shark (Carcharhinus brachyurus) and the sharptooth houndshark (Triakis megalopterus).

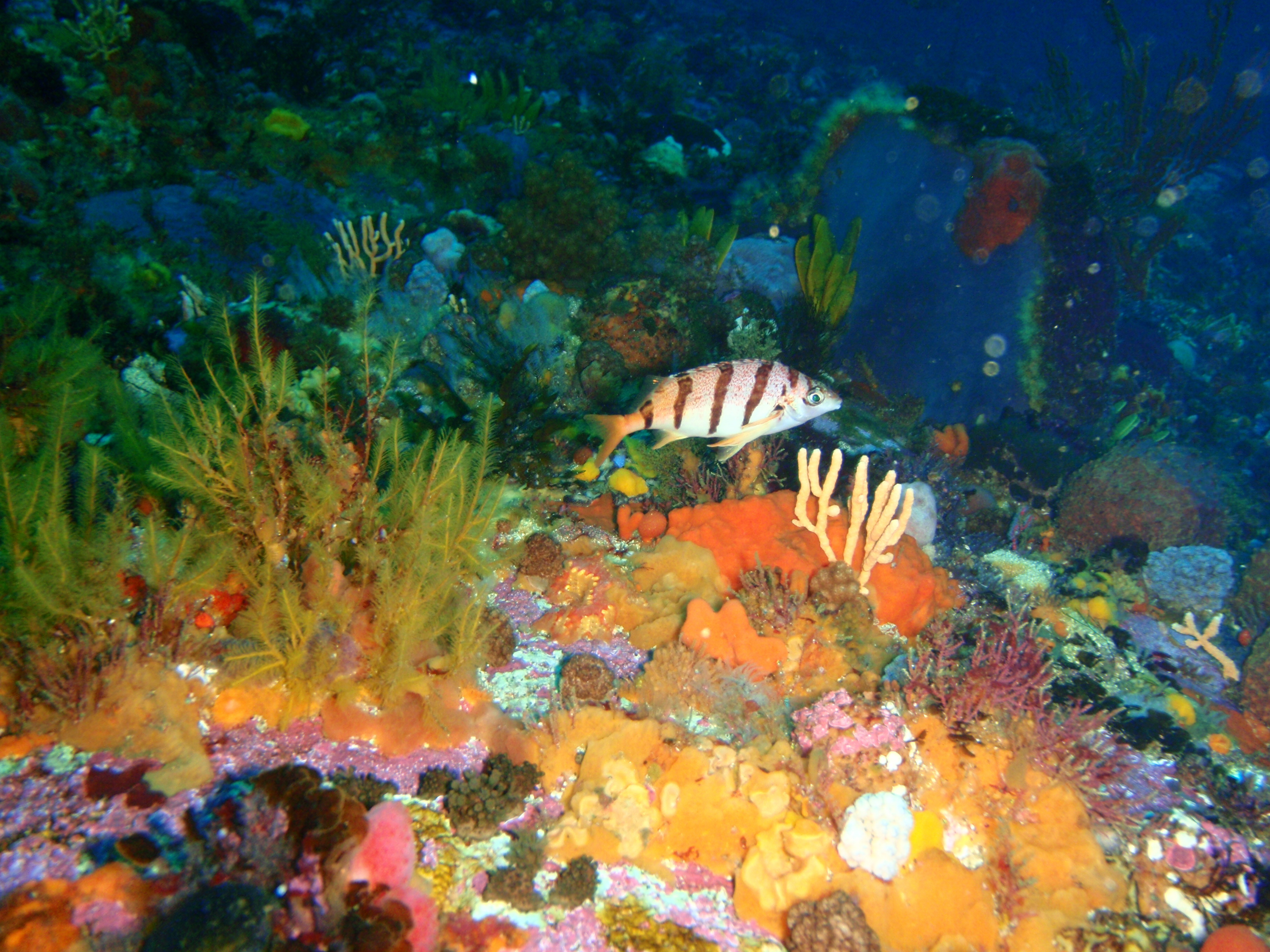
Barred Fingerfin at Rocky bank
