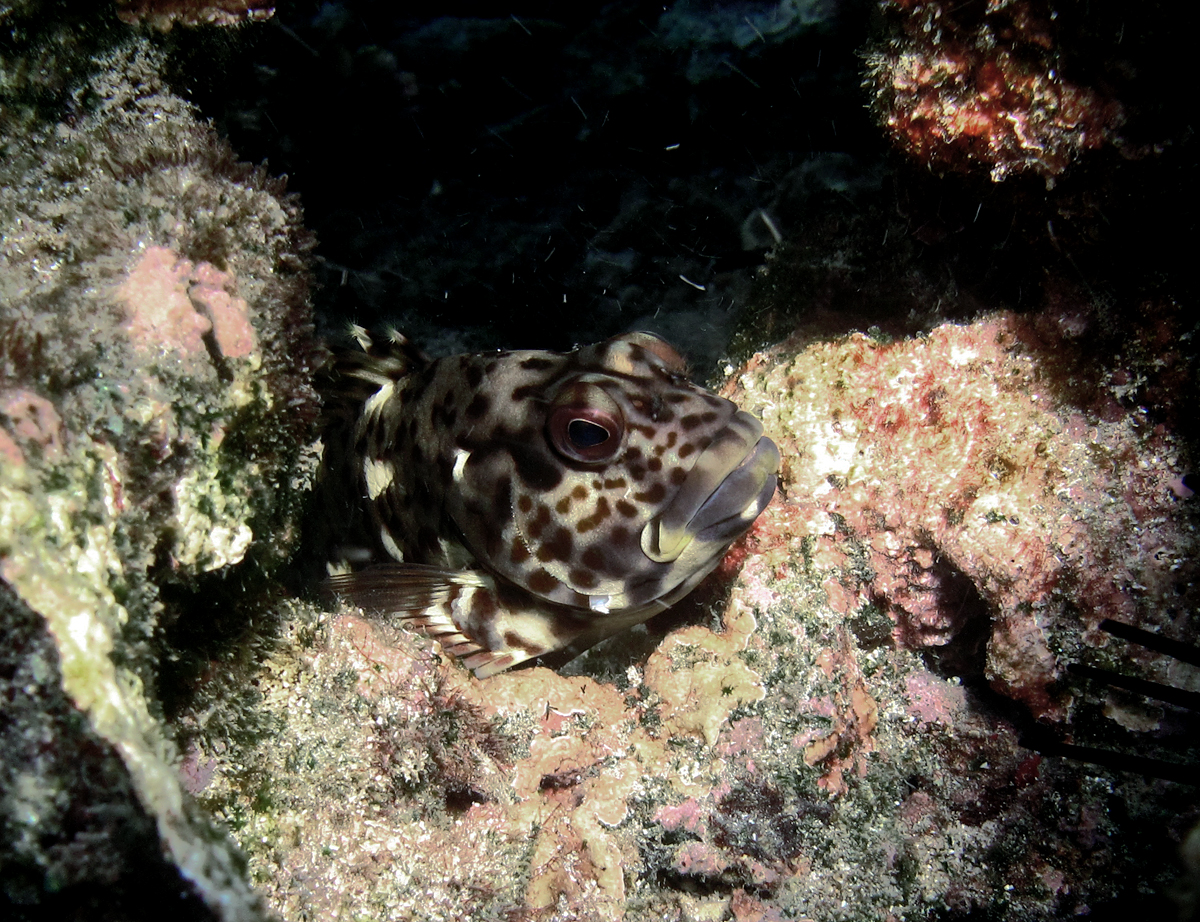
- Stocky hawkfish Cirrhitus pinnulatus
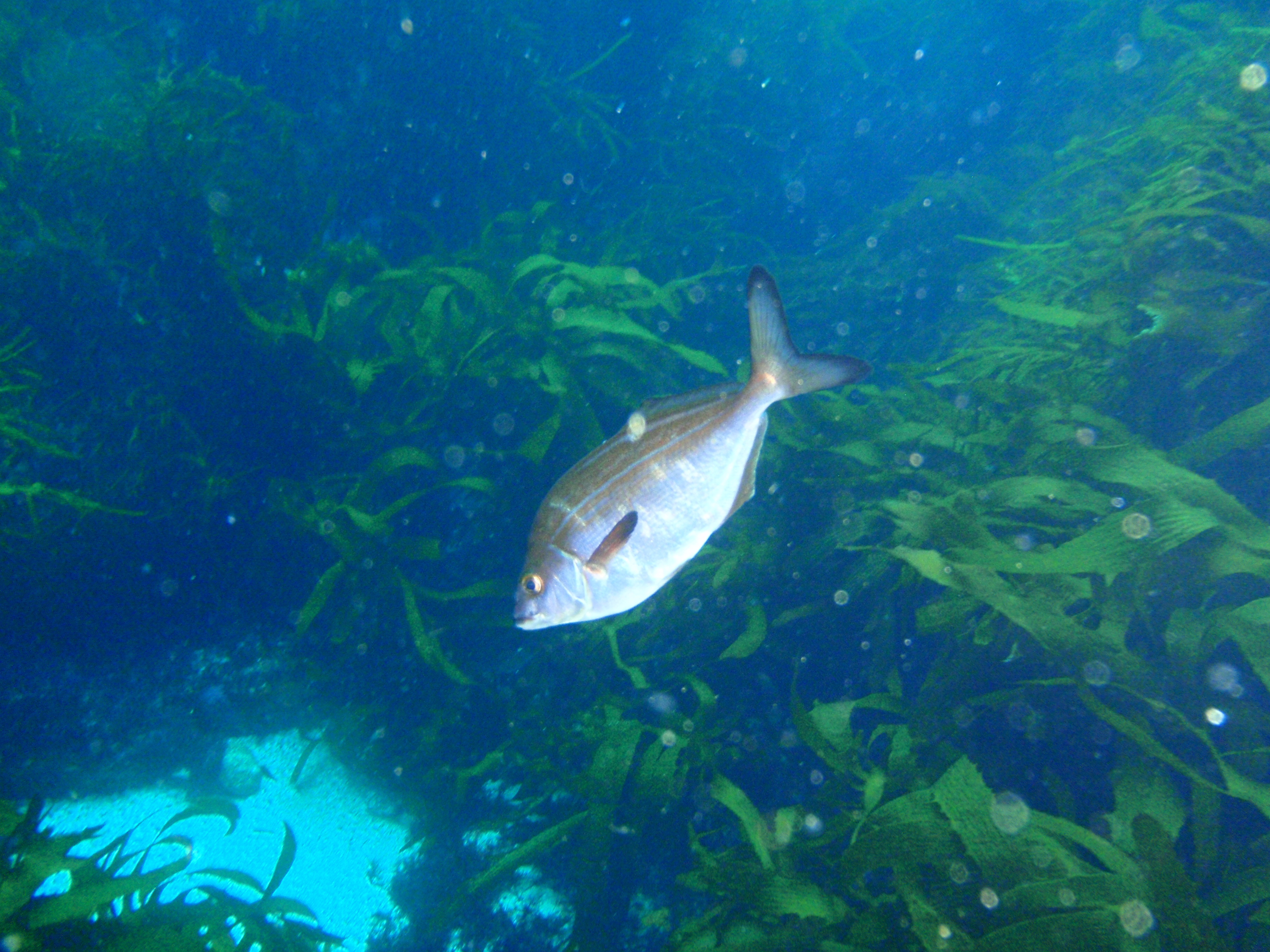
- Bastard trumpeter Latridopsis forsteri

Scientific classification
- Kingdom: Animalia
- Phylum: Chordata
- Class: Actinopterygii
- Order: Centrarchiformes
- Suborder: Cirrhitoidei

= Cirrhitoidei =

Suborder of ray-finned fishes

Cirrhitoidei is a suborder of ray-finned fishes within the order Centrarchiformes.

== Systematics ==
The group was previously treated as a superfamily, Cirrhitoidea, within the suborder Percoidei of the order Perciformes. Molecular studies confirmed the monophyly of the cirrhitoid group, but moved it to the new order Centrarchiformes. The 5th Edition of Fishes of the World does not recognise Centrarchiformes and retains the superfamily within the order Perciformes.

In his 1995 arrangement of the relationship between the families within the Cirrhitoidea Greenwood demonstrated that the Cirrhitidae was likely to be the most basal group, with the Chironemidae as the next most plesiomorphic family, with the remaining three families, Aplodactylidae, Cheilodactylidae, and Latridae having unresolved relationships within the group. A molecular study of 2004 suggested that the Latridae should be expanded to include some species from the Cheilodactylidae, and the 5th edition of Fishes of the World suggests that more studies should be undertaken to resolve the phylogeny of all of the taxa included in the Cirrhitoidea.

=== Families ===
Cirrhitoidei includes the following families:

- Cirrhitidae Macleay, 1841 (Hawkfishes)
- Chironemidae Gill, 1862 (Kelpfishes)
- Aplodactylidae Günther, 1859 (Marblefishes)
- Cheilodactylidae Bonaparte, 1850 (Fingerfishes)
- Latridae Gill, 1862 (Trumpeters)

== Characteristics ==
Members of Cirrhitoidei are characterised by having the pelvics fins placed relatively far to the posterior of the pectoral fins, The most ventral 5–8 rays of the pectorals are simple and unbranched, typically thickened and sometimes separate from each other. The anal fin normally has 3 spines.
