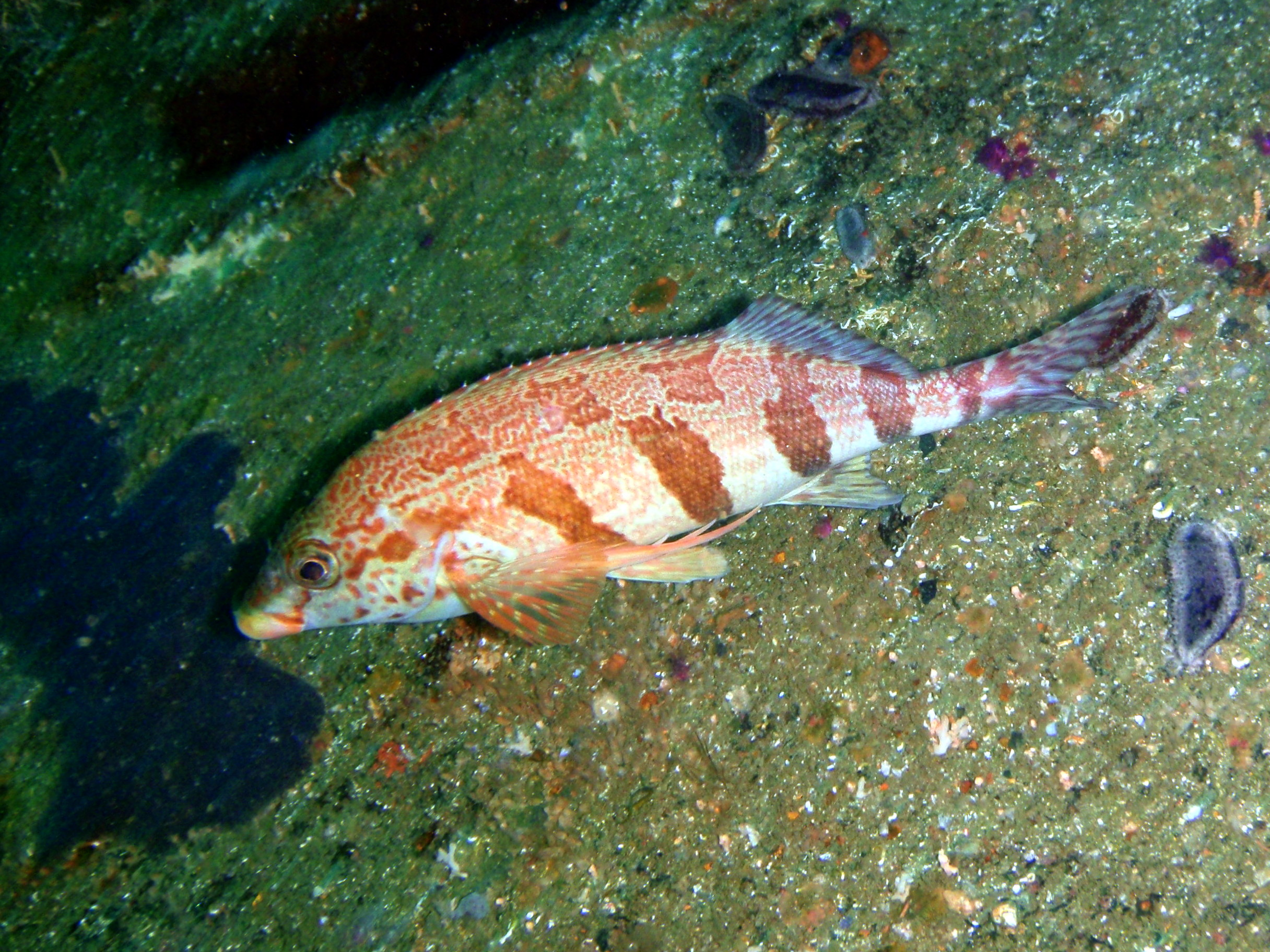

Conservation status
- Least Concern (IUCN 3.1)

Scientific classification
- Kingdom: Animalia
- Phylum: Chordata
- Class: Actinopterygii
- Division: Teleostei
- Order: Centrarchiformes
- Family: Cheilodactylidae
- Genus: Cheilodactylus
- Species: C. fasciatus

Binomial name
- Cheilodactylus fasciatus Lacépède, 1803

Synonyms
- Cheilodactylus multiradiatus Castelnau, 1861

= Redfingers =

Species of fish

The redfingers (Cheilodactylus fasciatus) is a species of marine ray-finned fish, belonging to the family Cheilodactylidae, commonly referred to as morwongs. It is found only off the coasts of Namibia and South Africa, in rock pools and from shallow depths to 120 m, on rocky reef areas. Its length is up to 30 cm.

== Taxonomy ==
The redfingers was first formally described in 1803 by the French naturalist Bernard Germain de Lacépède with the type locality given as the Cape of Good Hope. When Lacépède wrote his description this was the only species in the genus Cheilodactylus and so is its type species and that of the family Cheilodactylidae. Phylogenetic analyses and genetic studies of the morwongs have not supported the traditional arrangement of the families Cheilodactylidae and Latridae. This has led to some authorities suggesting that the majority of species in Cheilodactylidae should be placed in Latridae. A result of this rearrangement is that the only species which would remain in Cheilodactylidae are this species and C. pixi, both from southern Africa. This is because these analyses resolved the genus Cheilodactylus as polyphyletic. These studies appear to show that most of the species in Cheilodactylus sensu lato instead apparently to belong in several different genera and are not even members of the same family, but how many and their exact delimitation is not clear at present. The outlier species have been assigned to Chirodactylus, Goniistius, Morwong and Pseudogoniistius, but DNA and morphologic analyses found those species to be nested within Latridae and more derived than the kelpfish, marblefish and this species. The specific name fasciatus means "banded", a reference to the bars on the back and flanks of this species.

== Description ==
The redfingers has body which is oval in shape, with a depth that fits into its standard length 3.2 to 3.7 times. It has a small mouth,. pointed snout and a slightly concave breast. The dorsal fin has 17-19 spines and 23-25 soft rays while the anal fin contains 3 spines and 9-11 soft rays. This species attains a maximum total length of 30 cm (12 in). The pectoral fins have 14 rays with the lower 4-5 rays enlarged and red in colour. There are four wide reddish-brown stripes on lower flanks and five quadrangular marks on the upper flanks which line up with the stripes on the rear of body. The head covered with rectangular spots and dashes and the caudal fin has diagonal brown stripes.

== Distribution and habitat ==
The redfingers is endemic to the waters of southern Africa occurring in both the southeastern Atlantic Ocean and the southwestern Indian Ocean. Its range extends from Swakopmund in Namibia to northern KwaZulu-Natal in South Africa. They are typically found at depths down to 25 m (82 ft), although they are occasionally recorded as deep as 120 m (390 ft). It is found in rocky areas, especially reefs, while the juveniles are commonly found in tidal pools.

== Biology ==
The redfingers is a cryptic species which is well camouflaged in its rocky habitat. The adults are found either as solitary individuals or in small groups. These fish are more numerous in deeper waters where there is plentiful cover and caves, which are used as sanctuaries to when the water temperature falls and from predators. Its diet is dominated by benthic invertebrates including small crabs, molluscs and worms.

== Fisheries ==
The redfingers is caught accidentally in small numbers but it is of little interest to either recreational or commercial fisheries. They are used in coldwater aquaria but mainly in public aquaria.
