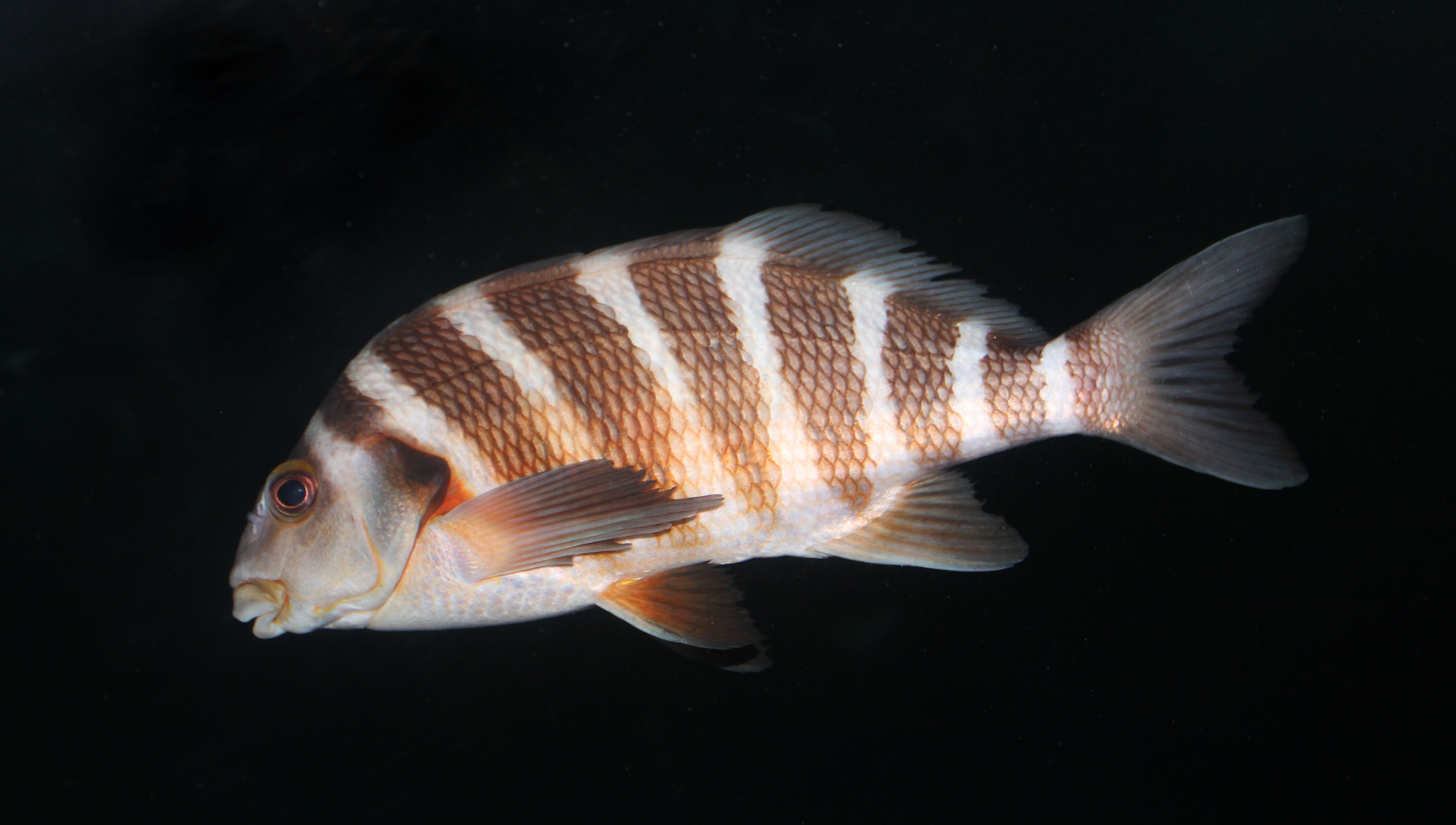

Conservation status
- Least Concern (IUCN 3.1)

Scientific classification
- Kingdom: Animalia
- Phylum: Chordata
- Class: Actinopterygii
- Division: Teleostei
- Order: Centrarchiformes
- Family: Latridae
- Genus: Chirodactylus
- Species: C. spectabilis

Binomial name
- Chirodactylus spectabilis (F. W. Hutton), 1872

Synonyms
- Cheilodactylus spectabilis Hutton, 1872; Goniistius spectabilis (Hutton, 1872); Chilodactylus allporti Günther, 1872; Cheilodactylus allporti Günther, 1872; Chilodactylus asper Klunzinger, 1872; Cheilodactylus asper Klunzinger, 1872; Cheilodactylus rubrofasciatus Castelnau, 1878

= Red moki =

Species of fish

The red moki (Chirodactylus spectabilis) also known as the banded morwong, brown-banded morwong, carp or nanua is a species of marine ray-finned fish, traditionally regarded as belonging to the family Cheilodactylidae, commonly referred to as morwongs. It is found off southern Australia and the North Island of New Zealand.

== Taxonomy ==
The red moki was first formally described in 1872 by Frederick Wollaston Hutton with the type locality given as the Cook Straits in New Zealand. Although traditionally included in the genus Cheilodactylus in family Cheilodactylidae, based on genetic and morphological analyses it belongs in the genus Chirodactylus in family Latridae. The specific name spectabilis means "notable" or "showy", a reference to the obvious bands on this fish.

== Description ==
The red moki is a distinctively marked fish which has a body with an overall silvery to light brown colour with a white on the underside of the head and body. There are 7-8 uniformly spaced, wide, rufous to nearly black bands along the flanks, the first 3 or 4 are angled towards the head, the remaining bands are vertical. The fins have blackish margins, with reddish bases. Rare individuals are plain reddish brown without any banding or with the band being indistinct. The mouth has thick, fleshy lips. The lower pectoral fin rays are relatively short compared to other morwongs. The maximum total length recorded for this species is 100 cm (39 in).

== Distribution and habitat ==
The red moki is restricted to the southwestern Pacific Ocean in Australia and New Zealand. In Australia, where it is more commonly known as the banded morwong, it occurs from Seal Rocks, New South Wales, to Kangaroo Island in South Australia, it is also found around Tasmania and the islands of the Bass Strait. It may occurs as far west in South Australia as the Point Drummond on the western coast of the Eyre Peninsula. In New Zealand it is found from the Three Kings Islands to Foveaux Strait. It reaches its maximum abundance around Tasmania and off the northern part of New Zealand's North Island. This species is found around coastal reefs in shallow waters, especially in areas which are exposed to wave surges, for example reefs lying off exposed rocky headlands. They can be common where there is kelp and other seaweeds and close to caves, crevices and overhangs. The adults inhabit deeper waters than the juveniles. They can be found at depths between 1 and 50 m (3 ft 3 in and 164 ft 1 in).

== Biology ==
The red moki is carnivorous and it feeds on a variety of benthic invertebrates, such as gastropods, bivalves, crustaceans, polychaetes and small sea urchins. The predation on very small sea urchins by red mokis may play a role in controlling the urchin numbers and in preventing the creation of urchin barrens. It is a long lived species and slow growing species with a longevity of up to 90 years old. The banded morwang is highly territorial with complex spawning behaviour and low fecundity. The recruitment of new fish into the population shows wide annual variation.

== Utilisation ==
=== Fisheries ===
The red moki is targeted by commercial and recreational fisheries using large mesh gillnets in Tasmania. They are also caught to be sold on the Tasmanian live fish trade in Tasmania and Victoria. They are taken as bycatch in the pots used to catch rock lobsters and these fisher may keep the catch to use as bait. They form a minor proportion of the bycatch in scalefish and shark fisheries managed by the Australian Government. They are also taken regularly by spear fishers across its range, bit it is less frequently landed by recreational rod and line fishermen.

Since 1995 the stocks of banded morwong off Tasmania have been sampled in order to get information on their biology> This is to be used to inform assessments on the stock. Since the sampling programme began there has been a significant reduction in the size of the fish and a simplification of the age structures of the population. For example, despite the potential long life span, fish which are older than 15 years are now comparatively rare compared to the data from the late 1990s. This may mean that the stock's ability to replenish itself is reduced as an individual has fewer spawning seasons it is able to take part in. It has also been found that younger fish apparently grow more quickly than when the programme started and the females seem to be reaching sexual maturity at smaller sizes and at far younger ages than previously. This early maturity could also be a limiting factor on the population's capacity for growth because larger, older females usually have a higher fecundity with young that have higher survival than females breeding at younger ages. The 2023/2024 assessment did not indicate that the stock was subjected to overfishing and suggested that the "current level of fishing mortality is unlikely to cause the stock to become recruitment impaired".

=== Human consumption ===
Red moki has firm, flaky flesh which is said to have a medium flavour, it is also said that it can be dry. Cooking methods which retain any moisture should be used such as poaching or baking in foil.
