= Goniistius vittatus =

Scientific classification
- Kingdom: Animalia
- Phylum: Chordata
- Class: Actinopterygii
- Order: Centrarchiformes
- Family: Cheilodactylidae
- Genus: Goniistius
- Species: G. vittatus

Binomial name
- Goniistius vittatus (Garrett, 1864)

Species of fish

== Lead ==
Goniistius vittatus, also called the Hawaiian morwong, is a marine fish species in the family Cheilodactylidae. It is a reef-associated fish found in the Pacific Ocean.

== Description ==
The Hawaiian morwong or Goniistius vittatus is a medium-sized fish that can reach approximately 41 cm in length. It has a high, laterally compressed body characterized by two oblique black bands on the body and three on the head. The head displays two pairs of bony protrusions, with one pair on the forehead in adults and a second pair at the front of the snout. Its body structure and coloration may provide camouflage from predators within the reef. This species has strong pectoral fins that allow it to rest upright on the seafloor. It is characterized by its thick, reddish, fleshy lips and a small mouth adapted for feeding on small organisms in sandy habitats.

== Behavior ==
Goniistius vittatus is primarily nocturnal, feeding on small invertebrates at night and resting under reef ledges during the day.This species is a benthic feeder, meaning it searches for food along the reef bottom rather than swimming in open water. Goniistius vittatus feed by taking in mouthful of sands, filtering out small invertebrates, including crustaceans, mollusks, and worms.

== Distribution and habitat ==
The Hawaiian morwong is mainly found in the Pacific Ocean, including Hawai'i, New Caledonia, Lord Howe Island, and the Kermadec Islands. The species inhabits reef environments and is typically found at depths between 1 and 66 meters.
