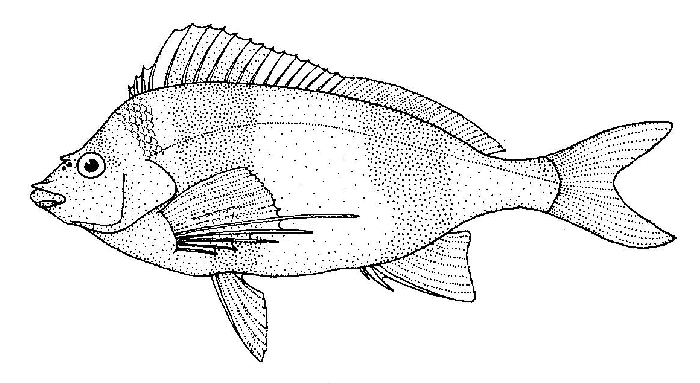

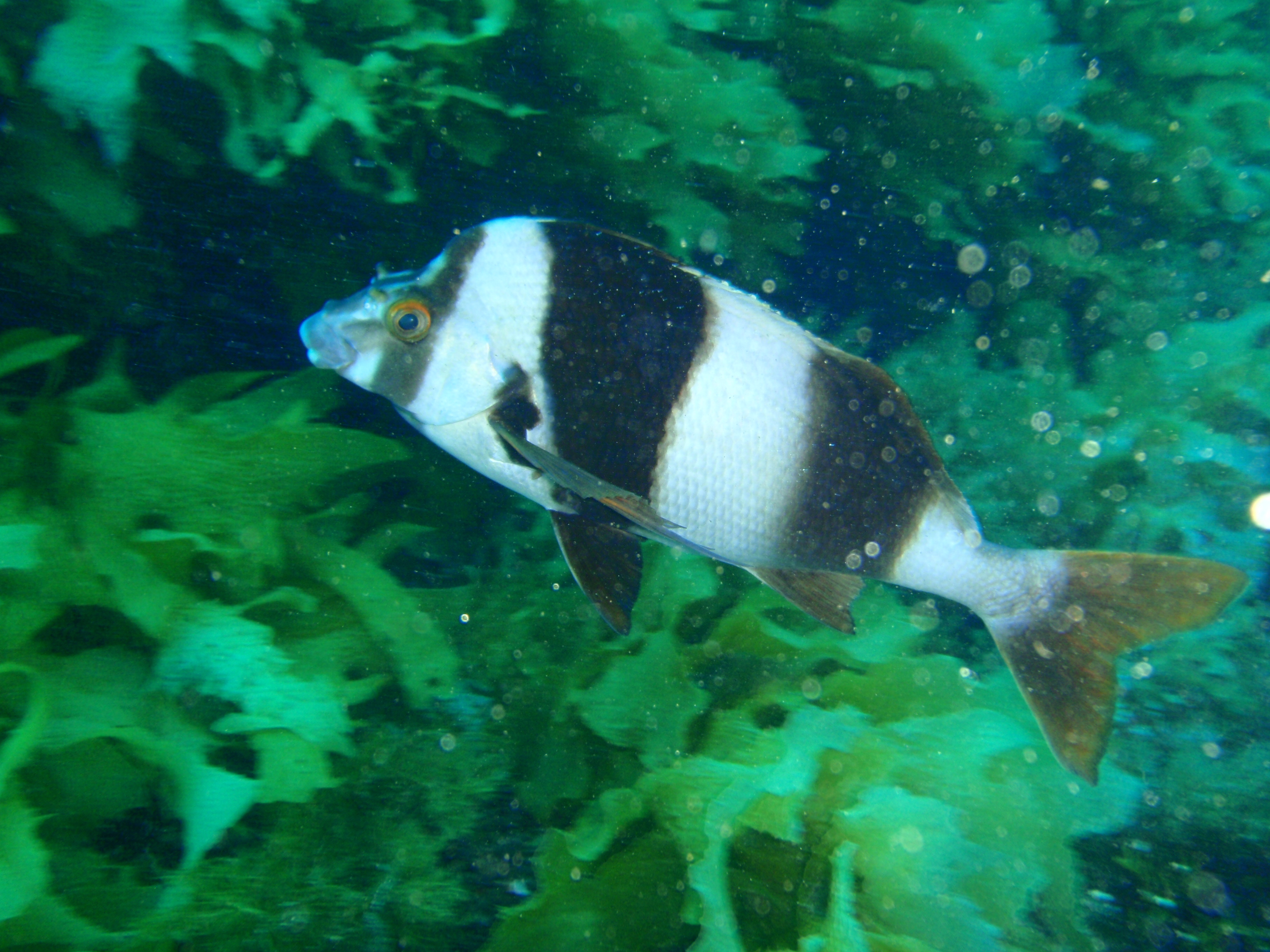

Conservation status
- Least Concern (IUCN 3.1)

Scientific classification
- Kingdom: Animalia
- Phylum: Chordata
- Class: Actinopterygii
- Order: Centrarchiformes
- Family: Latridae
- Genus: Pseudogoniistius; Ludt, Burridge & Chakrabarty, 2019
- Species: P. nigripes

Binomial name
- Pseudogoniistius nigripes (J. Richardson, 1850)

Synonyms
- Cheilodactylus (Pseudogoniistius) nigripes Richardson, 1850; Goniistius nigripes (Richardson, 1850); Goniistius vizonarius (Saville-Kent, 1887); Chilodactylus vizonarius Saville-Kent, 1888

= Magpie perch =

Species of fish

The magpie perch (Pseudogoniistius nigripes), magpie morwong or black-striped morwong, is a species of marine ray-finned fish, traditionally regarded as belonging to the family Cheilodactylidae, the members of which are commonly known as morwongs. It is found off southern Australia and northern New Zealand from shallow depths to 250 m (820 ft).

== Taxonomy ==
The magpie perch was first formally described in 1850 by the Scottish naval surgeon, arctic explorer and naturalist Sir John Richardson with the type locality given as King George Sound in Western Australia. The specific name nigripes means “black foot”, referring to the colour of the ventral fins on a dried specimen.

Although traditionally included in the genus Cheilodactylus in family Cheilodactylidae, genetic and morphological analyses strongly suggest that it belongs in its own genus, called Pseudogoniistius, which is placed in the family Latridae. The name of the genus is a compound of pseudo which means “false” and Goniistius, in reference to another clade traditionally placed in Cheilodactyus sensu lato to which this species bears a resemblance and to the confusion this taxon has wrought among taxonomists of morwongs.

== Description ==
The magpie perch has a robust, oval, compressed body The dorsal profile of the head is concave and there is a pair of small bony protuberances in front of the eyes. It has thick, fleshy lips. The ventral pectoral fin rays are robust and elongated. The dorsal fin contains 18 spines and 24-28 soft rays while the anal fin has 3 spines and 10 soft rays. The magpie perch attains a maximum total length of 41 cm (16 in).Thisfish is marked with three wide black bands, the first is on the head, the second girdles the body to the rear of the head and the third runs from the anal fin to the soft rayed part of the dorsal fin. In some individuals the central band is dark and in others it is pale grey. The juveniles have a reddish tail which darkens as they mature. The magpie morwong is able to change its appearance by "turning off" its central black band almost instantly.

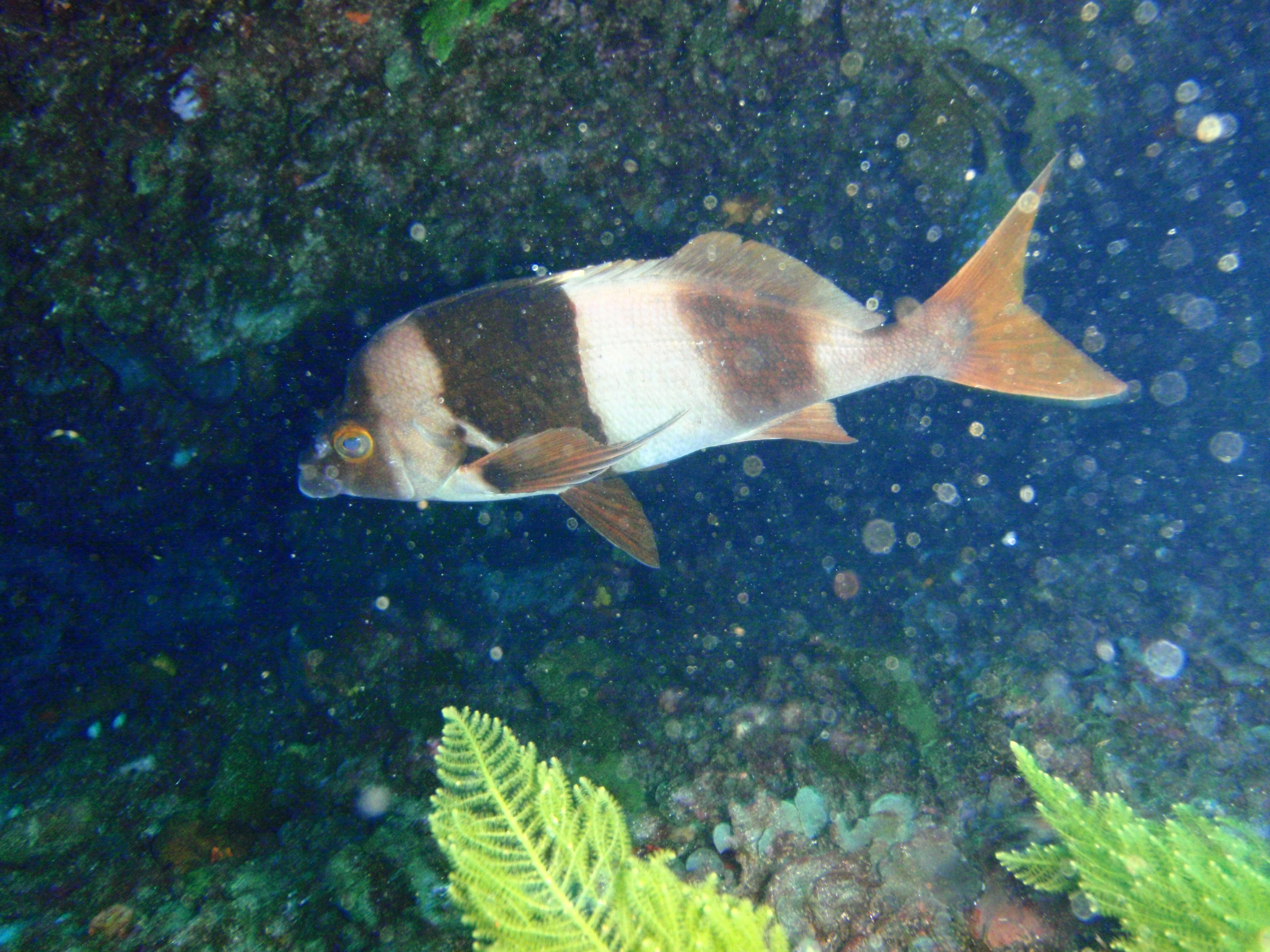
Juvenile

== Distribution and habitat ==
The magpie perch is found in Australia and New Zealand. In Australia is can be found from Albany, Western Australia along the southern coast and northwards on the eastern coast as far as Sydney, it can also be found off the islands in the Bass Strait and northern Tasmania. The epipelagic larvae and small juveniles drift with the currents from Australia across the Tasman Sea accounting for the infrequent records from northern and eastern New Zealand. It can be found on sheltered and exposed coastal reefs, often encountered in caves and below overhangs, at depths between 0 to 25 m (0 to 82 ft).

== Biology ==
The magpie perch feeds on benthic invertebrates which it draws through its mouth by sucking them up from the sediment and from algal turfs. They often use caves and overhangs to shelter in, frequently as small groups.
