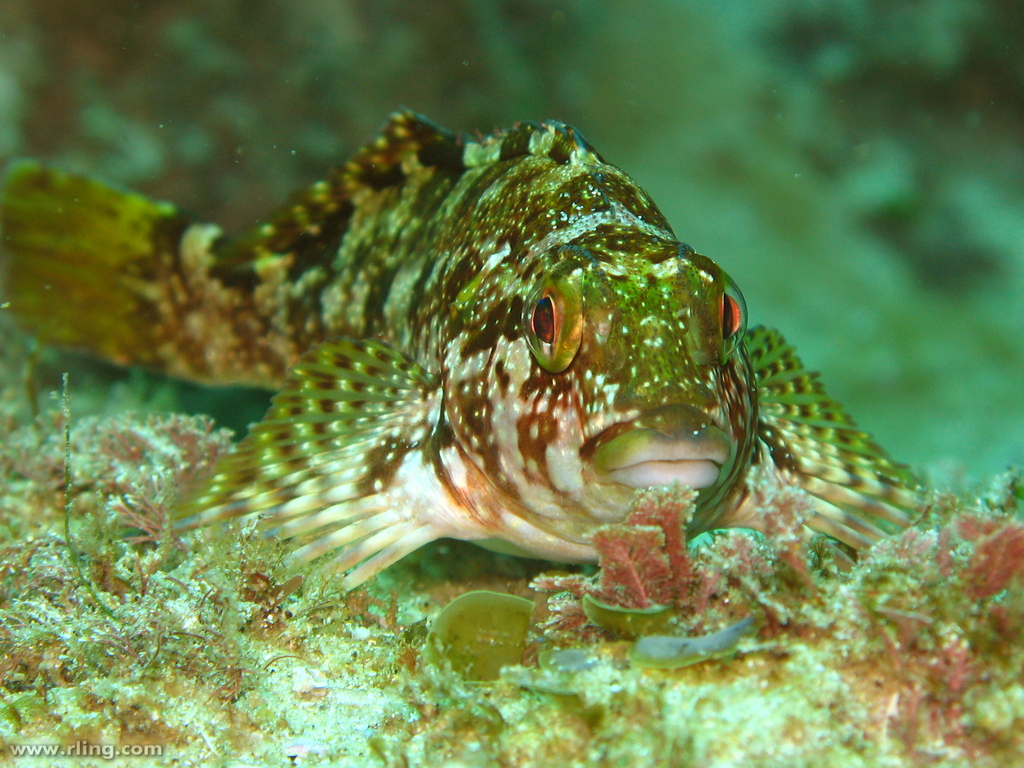
- Large kelpfish (C. marmoratus)

Scientific classification
- Kingdom: Animalia
- Phylum: Chordata
- Class: Actinopterygii
- Division: Teleostei
- Order: Centrarchiformes
- Suborder: Cirrhitoidei
- Family: Chironemidae; T. N. Gill, 1862
- Genus: Chironemus; G. Cuvier, 1829

Type species
- Chironemus georgianus G. Cuvier, 1829

Synonyms
- For genus: Threpterius J. Richardson, 1850

= Chironemus =

Kelpfishes

Genus of ray-finned fishes

Chironemus is a genus of marine ray finned fish, commonly known as kelpfishes, belonging to the family Chironemidae. They are found in the temperate waters of the Southern Pacific Ocean.

== Taxonomy ==
The Kelpfishes were placed in the monogeneric family Chironemidae in 1862 by the American ichthyologist Theodore Nicholas Gill. The genus had been described in 1829 by the French zoologist Georges Cuvier when he had described the type species Chironemus georgianus. The family is regarded as part of the superfamily Cirrhitoidea, which is placed within the order Perciformes in the 5th Edition of Fishes of the World, however other authorities place this clade within a new order within the wider Percomorpha, Centrarchiformes. The name of the genus is from Greek cheir meaning "hands" and nema meaning "thread".

== Species ==
The currently recognized species in this genus are:

- Chironemus bicornis (Steindachner, 1898)
- Chironemus delfini (Porter, 1914)
- Chironemus georgianus G. Cuvier, 1829 (tasselled kelpfish)
- Chironemus maculosus (J. Richardson, 1850) (silver spot)
- Chironemus marmoratus Günther, 1860 (large kelpfish)
- Chironemus microlepis Waite, 1916 (smallscale kelpfish)

== Characteristics ==
The fishes within the genus Chironemus have tubular nostrils which have tufts of cirri. They have moderately sized cycloid scales. The continuous dorsal fin has a long base and robust spines. The spiny part of the dorsal fin is separated from the soft rayed part by distinct incision. The anal fin has small with thick spines. The large pectoral fins have their upper fin rays branched and 6 the six lower rays are notably more robust and are unbranched. These high backed fishes resemble the morwongs belonging to the family Cheilodactylidae but they have a truncate caudal fin and fewer soft rays in the anal fin. They typically have a marbled colour pattern camouflaging them in their preferred rocky habitat. The dorsal dins of these fishes contain 14-16 spines and 15-21 soft rays while their anal fins contain 6-8 soft rays. They have vomerine teeth but there are no teeth on the palatine. They grow to a maximum of approximately 40 cm (16 in).

== Distribution and habitat ==
Chironemus kelpfishes are found in the southern Pacific Ocean off Australia, New Zealand and the western coast of South America off Peru and Chile. They are coastal fishes adapted to living in shallow waters where they are exposed to waves.

== Biology ==
Chironemus kelpfishes feed on benthic invertebrates. They lodge themselves into small niches or interstices in rocks holding their bodies in place with their large pectoral fins.
