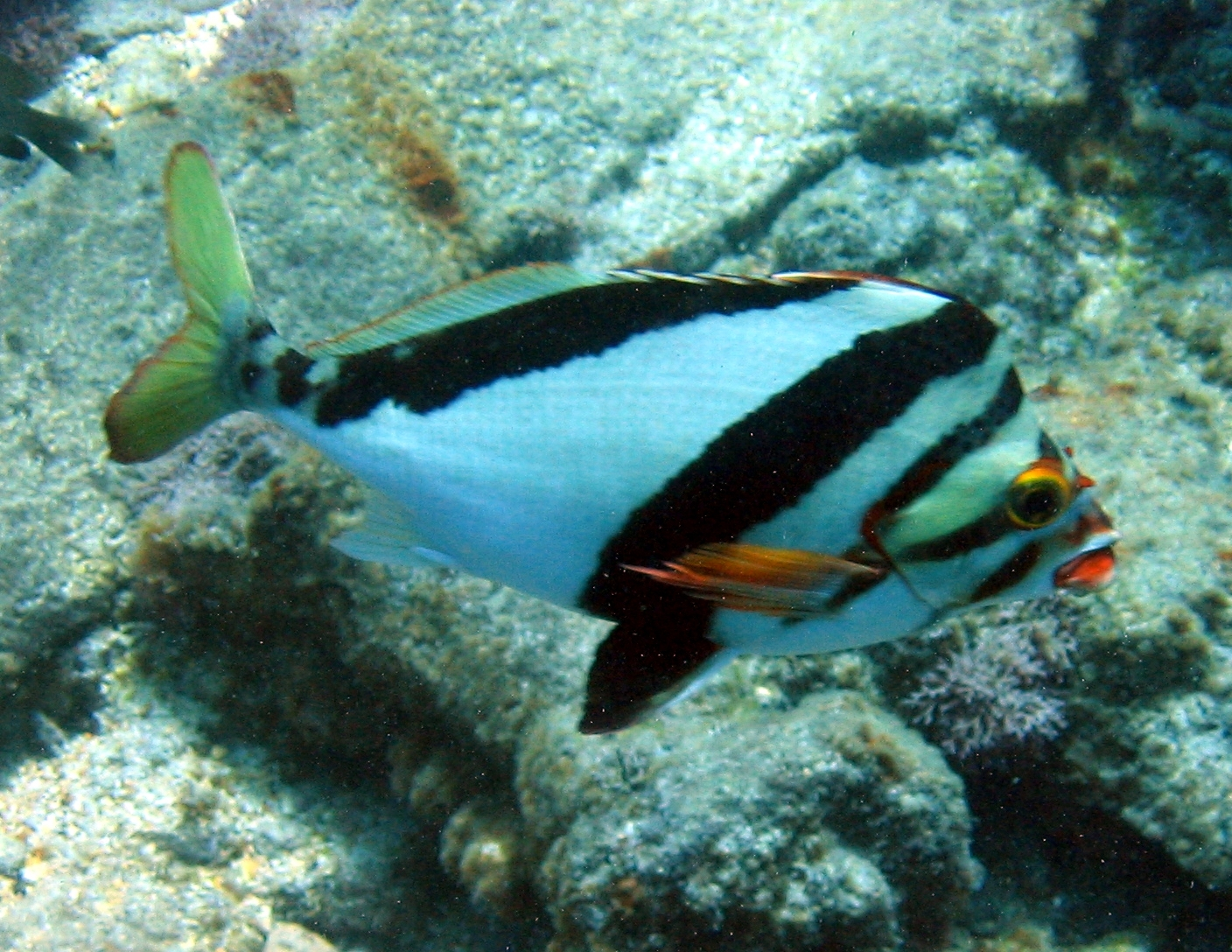

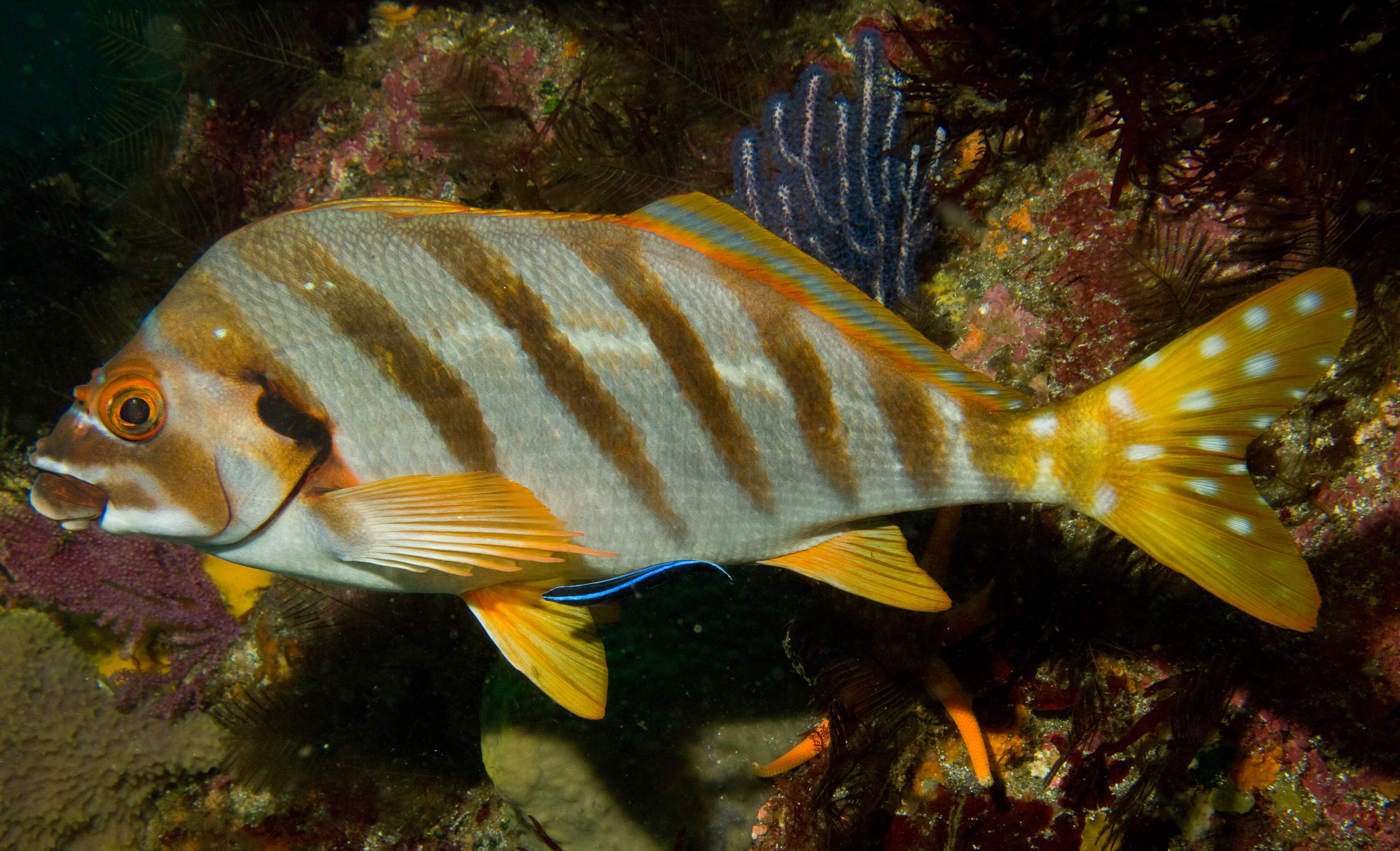
- Goniistius vittatus (above), Goniistius zonatus (below)

Scientific classification
- Kingdom: Animalia
- Phylum: Chordata
- Class: Actinopterygii
- Order: Centrarchiformes
- Family: Cheilodactylidae
- Genus: Goniistius; Gill, 1862

Type species
- Cheilodactylus zonatus G. Cuvier, 1830

Synonyms
- Gregoryina Fowler & Ball, 1924; Zeodrius Castelnau, 1879

= Goniistius =

Genus of Actinopterygii

Goniistius is a genus of marine ray-finned fishes, traditionally classified as being a subgenus within the genus Cheilodactylus and belonging to the family Cheilodactylidae, known as morwongs, although this name is not unique to this family and the true taxonomic placement of this taxon requires clarification. They are found in the Pacific Ocean and southeastern Indian Ocean.

== Taxonomy ==
Goniistius was created as a subgenus of Cheilodactylus in 1862 by the American ichthyologist Theodore Nicholas Gill with Cheilodactylus zonatus designated as its type species. The name of the subgenus is a compound of gonio meaning “angle” and istios which means “sail”, Gill did not explain what his name alluded to but he may have been referring to the deep incision between spiny and soft-rayed parts of the dorsal fin of the type species.

Genetic and morphological analyses of the family Cheolodactylidae have found that the family as traditionally arranged is polyphyletic. These analyses suggest that the a monophyletic Cheilodactylidae would contain only two species, the southern African C. fasciatus and C. pixi. Goniistius is then proposed to be a valid genus and would be placed in the family Latridae.

== Species ==
The following species belong in this genus:

- Goniistius francisi (C. P. Burridge, 2004) (Blacktip morwong)
- Goniistius gibbosus J. Richardson, 1841 (Western crested morwong)
- Goniistius plessisi J. E. Randall, 1983 (Plessis' morwong)
- Goniistius quadricornis Günther, 1860
- Goniistius rubrolabiatus G. R. Allen & Heemstra, 1976
- Goniistius vestitus (Castelnau, 1879) (Crested morwong)
- Goniistius vittatus A. Garrett, 1864 (Hawaiian morwong)
- Goniistius zebra Döderlein, 1883 (Redlip morwong)
- Goniistius zonatus (G. Cuvier, 1830) (Spottedtail morwong)

== Characteristics ==
Goniistius is characterised by having an oval, compressed body. The mouth has thick, fleshy lips, In most species there is a bony processes on the frontal bone in line with the centre of the eye or it is in the front of the mouth in two species while in G. rubrolabiatus and G. zonatus it is absent. All species have a steep dorsal profile to the head and a deep body, other than G. rubrolabiatus There are 14-17 spines and 29-35 soft rays in the dorsal fin while the anal fin contains 3 spines and 8-12 soft rays, There are 14 pectoral fin rays, of these the lowermost 6 are simple and robust, and the fin does not extend to the anal fin. The pattern of the body is typically that there are a number of black and white diagonal bars along the body and head, except for G. rubrolabiatus, in which the black is replaced by reddish brown, and in G. zonatus in which yellow replaces the black. The maximum total length of the species within Goniistius ranges from 22.1 cm (8.7 in) in G. zebra and 45 cm (18 in) in G. zonatus.

== Distribution and habitat ==
The species in Goniistius are mainly found in the Pacific Ocean in both the northern Pacific and southern Pacific. This genus contains the only morwongs found in the northern hemisphere. Two species reach the eastern Indian Ocean. They are found in rocky areas.

== Biology ==
Goniistius morwongs feed on benthic invertebrates which they pick from the substrate.
