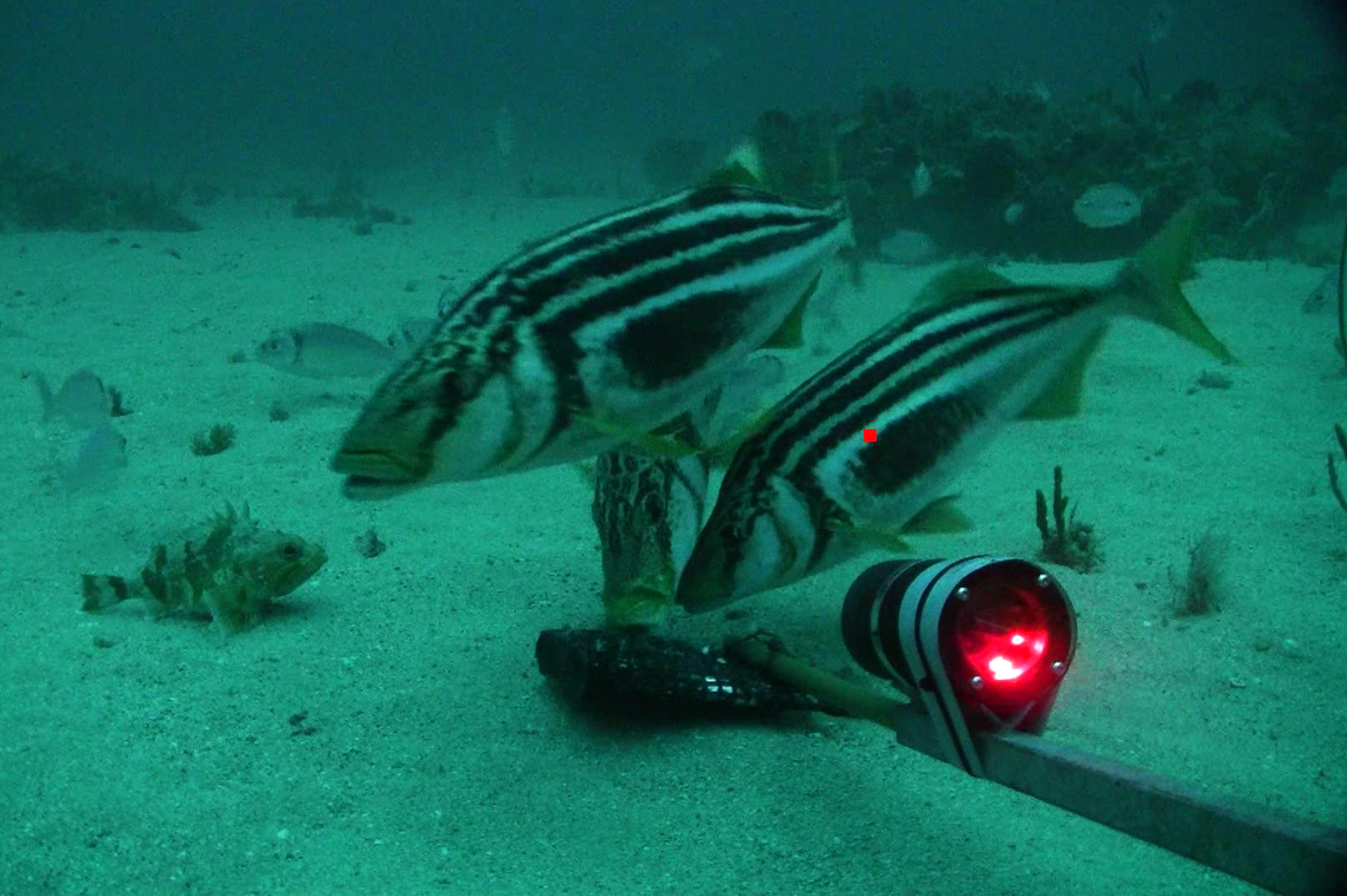
- Striped Trumpeter, (Latris lineata), on a deep reef in the Flinders Commonwealth Marine Reserve, northeast Tasmania - depth 160 m

Scientific classification
- Kingdom: Animalia
- Phylum: Chordata
- Class: Actinopterygii
- Order: Centrarchiformes
- Suborder: Cirrhitoidei
- Family: Latridae; T. N. Gill, 1862

Genera
- see text

= Latridae =

Family of fishes

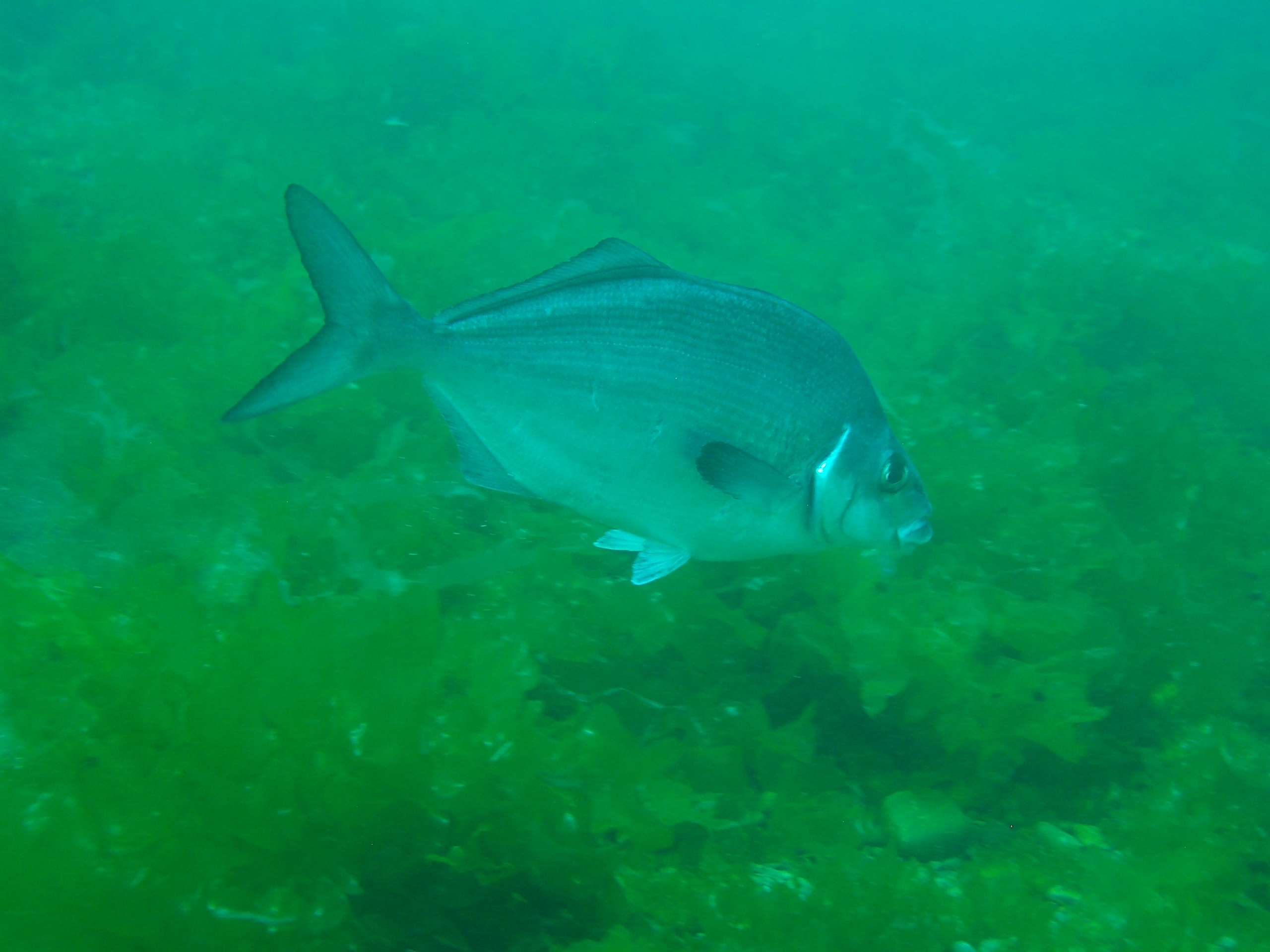
New Zealand Blue Moki (Latridopsis ciliaris)

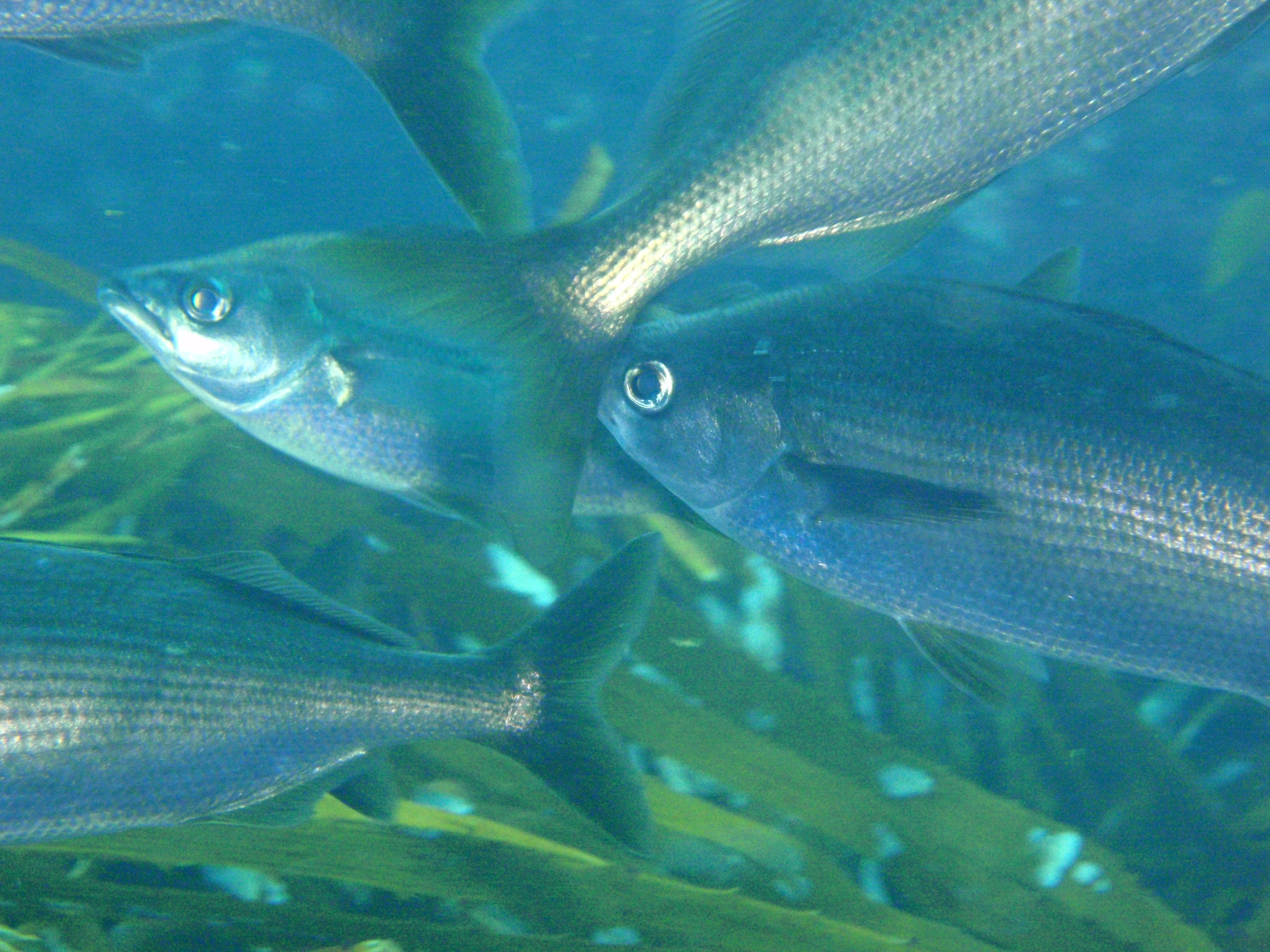
Telescope fish (Mendosoma lineatum)

Latridae commonly called trumpeters, is a family of marine ray-finned fish. They are found in temperate seas in the Southern Hemisphere. The classification of the species within the Latridae and the related Cheilodactylidae is unclear.They are fished commercially and for sport.

== Taxonomy ==
Latridae is classified within the superfamily Cirrhitoidea, under the suborder Percoidei of the large order Perciformes. Molecular studies have also placed the superfamily within the order Centrarchiformes, although the Cirrhitoidea is confirmed as a monophyletic clade. The 5th Edition of Fishes of the World does not recognise Centrarchiformes and retains the superfamily within the order Perciformes. The family has three genera according to the 5th Edition of Fishes of the World, however the authors of that book admit that further studies need to be carried out to resolve the true relationships of all the taxa within the Cirrhitoidea. Latridae was first formally desecrribed as a family in 1862 by Theodore Nicholas Gill.

The traditional delimitation of this family and Chaeilodactylidae is based on morphological differences, but the reliability of these differences has been questioned, and genetics do not support this treatment, either, leading some to suggest the majority of species traditionally classified as Cheilodactylidae should be placed within Latridae. Based on this, the only species that should remain in the family Cheilodactylidae are the relatively small Cheilodactylus fasciatus and C. pixi from southern Africa. This also means the broader definition of the genus Cheilodactylus is polyphyletic. All other species traditionally placed within the genus "Cheilodactylus" clearly do not, according to these analyses, belong with these two in Cheilodactylus and instead appear to belong in several different genera within Latridae, but how many and their exact delimitation is not clear at present.

=== Genera ===
The traditional classification places the following three genera in the family Latridae:

- Latridopsis Gill, 1862
- Latris Richardson, 1839
- Mendosoma Guichenot, 1848

The revised classification sensu Ludt, Burridge and Chakrabarty 2019 is:

- **Chirodactylus Gill, 1862
- Dactylophora De Vis, 1883
- *Goniistius Gill, 1862
- Latridopsis Gill, 1862
- Latris Richardson, 1839
- Mendosoma Guichenot, 1848
- *Morwong Whitley, 1957
- Nemadactylus Richardson, 1839
- *Pseudogoniistius Ludt, Burridge & Chakrabarty, 2019

* means at least one member, the red moki (C. spectabilis) was traditionally classified in Chelidactylus sensu lato
** means traditionally classified in Chelidactylus sensu lato

== Characteristics ==
Latridae Fishes have somewhat elongate bodies, small mouths and sharp teeth. They have a continuous dorsal fin which has an incision separating the spiny part and the soft-rayed part. They have small pectoral and pelvic fins and a forked caudal fin. There are 14–24 spines in the dorsal fin and 24–30 soft rays while the anal fin has 18–35 soft rays. The lowest pectoral fin rays of the Latridae species in the traditional classification are not thickened or extended.

== Distribution and habitat ==
The Latridae are found in the temperate South Atlantic, South Pacific and southern Indian Oceans where they tend to be associated with reefs and rock substrates.

== Fisheries ==
The Latridae contains species which are important species for game fisheries.
