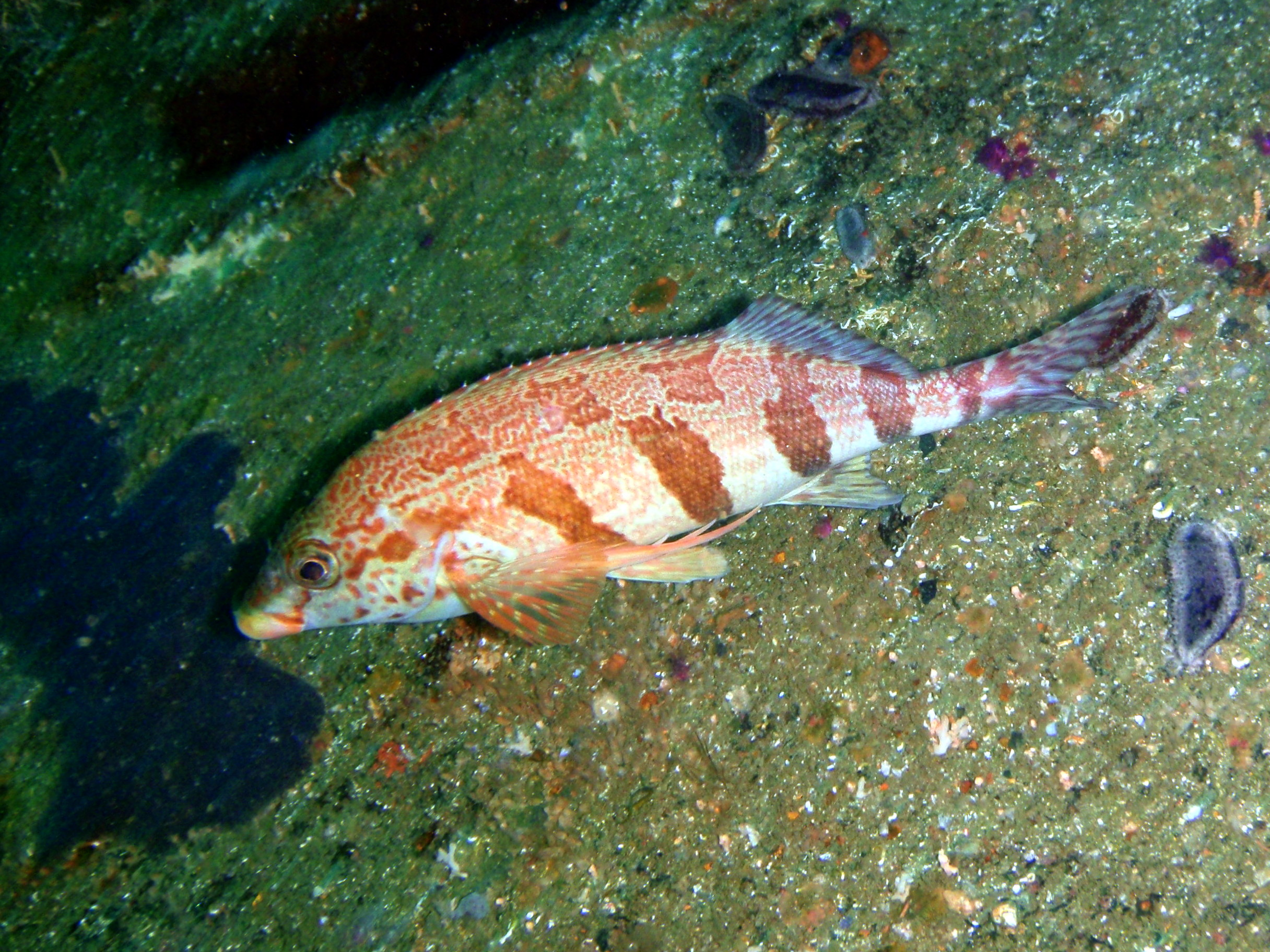
- Cheilodactylus fasciatus

Scientific classification
- Kingdom: Animalia
- Phylum: Chordata
- Class: Actinopterygii
- Order: Centrarchiformes
- Suborder: Cirrhitoidei
- Family: Cheilodactylidae; Bonaparte, 1850

Genera
- See text

= Cheilodactylidae =

Family of fishes

Cheilodactylidae, commonly called morwongs but also known as butterfish, fingerfins, jackassfish, sea carp, snappers, and moki, is a family of marine ray-finned fish. They are found in subtropical oceans in the Southern Hemisphere. The common name "morwong" is also used as a name for several unrelated fish found in Australian waters, such as the painted sweetlips (Diagramma pictum). The classification of the species within the Cheilodactylidae and the related Latridae is unclear.

== Taxonomy ==
Cheilodactylidae is classified within the superfamily Cirrhitoidea, under the suborder Percoidei of the large order Perciformes. Molecular studies have also placed the superfamily within the order Centrarchiformes, although the Cirrhitoidea is confirmed as a monophyletic clade. The 5th Edition of Fishes of the World does not recognise Centrarchiformes and retains the superfamily within the order Perciformes. The family has four genera according to the 5th Edition of Fishes of the World, however the authors of that book admit that further studies need to be carried out to resolve the true relationships of all the taxa within the Cirrhitoidea.

The traditional delimitation of this family and Latridae is based on morphological differences, but the reliability of these differences has been questioned, and genetics do not support this treatment, either, leading some to suggest the majority should be in Latridae. Based on this, the only species that should remain in the family Cheilodactylidae are the relatively small Cheilodactylus fasciatus and C. pixi from southern Africa. This also means the broader definition of the genus Cheilodactylus is polyphyletic. All other "Cheilodactylus" species clearly do not belong with these two in Cheilodactylus and instead appear to belong in several different genera (only one of which is Goniistius), but how many and their exact delimitation is not clear at present.

== Genera ==
The following genera are classified within the Cheilodactylidae:

- Cheilodactylus Lacépède, 1803
- Chirodactylus Gill, 1862
- Dactylophora De Vis, 1883
- Nemadactylus Richardson, 1839

== Characteristics ==
Cheilodactylids have a continuous dorsal fin which may have the anterior spiny part almost separated from the soft rayed posterior part, the spiny part contains 14–22 spines and the soft rayed part has 19–39 rays. The anal fin has 3 spines. although the third may be small and quite be difficult to see. and 7–19 soft rays. there are no teeth on the roof of or at the sides the mouth. The lowermost 4-7 pectoral fin rays of adults are normally robust, elongated, and not attached to the main part of the pectoral fin. The largest species is Dactylophora nigricans which attains a maximum total length of 120 cm (47 in).

== Distribution and habitat ==
Cheilodactylids are fishes of near-shore rocky reefs to depths of about 300 m (980 ft). They are found mainly in temperate waters in the southern hemisphere but some species classified in the subgenus Goniistius, of the genus Cheilodactylus sensu lato extend into the North Pacific.

== Biology ==
Cheilodactylids are nocturnal foragers and are carnivorous, feeding on benthic invertebrates such as crustaceans, molluscs and echinoderms. They do not guard their eggs.

== Fisheries ==
Cheilodactylids are generally regarded as important food fish and at least one species is targeted by commercial fisheries in Australia.
