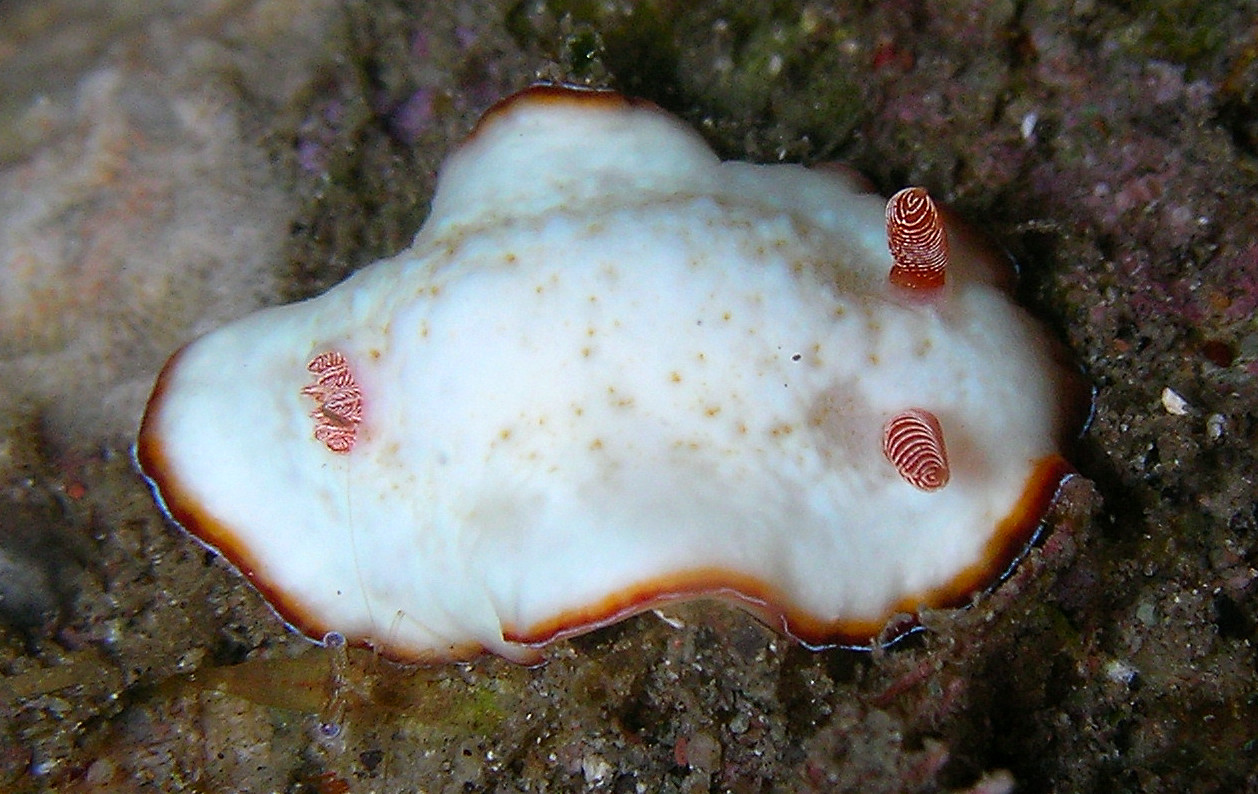

Scientific classification
- Kingdom: Animalia
- Phylum: Mollusca
- Class: Gastropoda
- Order: Nudibranchia
- Family: Chromodorididae
- Genus: Goniobranchus
- Species: G. preciosus

Binomial name
- Goniobranchus preciosus (Kelaart, 1858)

Synonyms
- Chromodoris preciosa (Kelaart, 1858); Doris preciosa Kelaart, 1858 (basionym)

= Goniobranchus preciosus =

Species of gastropod

Goniobranchus preciosus is a species of colourful sea slug, a dorid nudibranch, a marine gastropod mollusc in the family Chromodorididae.

== Distribution ==
The type locality for this species is Ceylon (Sri Lanka). It has been reported widely in the subtropical and tropical Indo-Pacific oceans.

The records Gosliner et al. 2008 cites from New Caledonia, Tonga, Fiji, Vanuatu, and Australia are in fact of G. fabulus. G. preciosus exists mostly North and West of the Philippines, and G. fabulus exists mostly South and East.

== Description ==
The Goniobranchus preciosus species complex, including G. preciosus, G. albonares, G. verrieri, G. sinensis, G. fabulus, andG. rubrocornutus, has long been difficult to differentiate for both hobbyists and researchers. In 2022, Soong and Gosliner performed an exhaustive study analyzing molecular and morphological differences in these species. It was found that species within this complex exhibit polymorphism. The study defined four distinct morphotypes for G. preciosus.

Diagnostics consistent across all four morphotypes: an ovular white body, that often has low tubercles on the notum. The mantle bears 3 submarginal bands, in this order: an outer blue band, a red submarginal band, and a yellow inner submarginal band. The retractile gills are reddish brown with outer white lines, and are held rather tight and erectly. The perfoliate rhinophores are reddish brown with white-edged lamellae. The reddish pigment that colours the club always extends onto the translucent rhinophoral stalk; this detail in particular is an important diagnostic feature when distinguishing more cryptic individuals, as the rhinophoral stalks of G. verrieri, G. fabulus, and G. rubrocornutus morphotypes are all strictly translucent without pigment. G. preciosus holds its gills more erect than G. verrieri and G. fabulus also.

== Known Misidentifications ==
With such a nuanced species complex, misidentifications and outdated IDs can be common even in current texts. Below is a short list of known misidentifications, with the purpose of easing research and reducing confusion.

In Rudman 1985, Figs. 12B, 13B, and 17 of Chromodoris preciosa (=Goniobranchus preciosus) are in fact G. fabulus.

On Bill Rudman's The Sea Slug Forum, the photo provided for the G. preciosus factsheet as well as the slug labeled "B" in the lower image is in fact G. fabulus. Throughout the forum's messaging in regards to C. preciosa (=G. preciosus), images of G. fabulus and G. verrieri are mixed in.

In Gosliner et al.'s 2008 field guide on page 219, the "upper right" photo is G. fabulus. Additionally, the records Gosliner et al. cites from New Caledonia, Tonga, Fiji, Vanuatu, and Australia are also of G. fabulus.

In Gosliner et al.'s 2018 field guides, First edition on 222 and Second Edition on page 152 there are multiple pictures for G. preciosus. In the first edition the "lower middle right" photo and in the second edition the upper right photo are of G. fabulus.
