= P. graveolens =

P. graveolens may refer to:

- Pelargonium graveolens, a plant species found in southern Africa
- Peperomia graveolens, a plant species endemic to Ecuador
- Plectranthus graveolens, a shrub species native to New South Wales and Queensland in Australia
- Psilocybe graveolens, a mushroom species discovered in the salt marshes of Hackensack, New Jersey
