= North Solitary Island Light =

Lighthouse in New South Wales, Australia

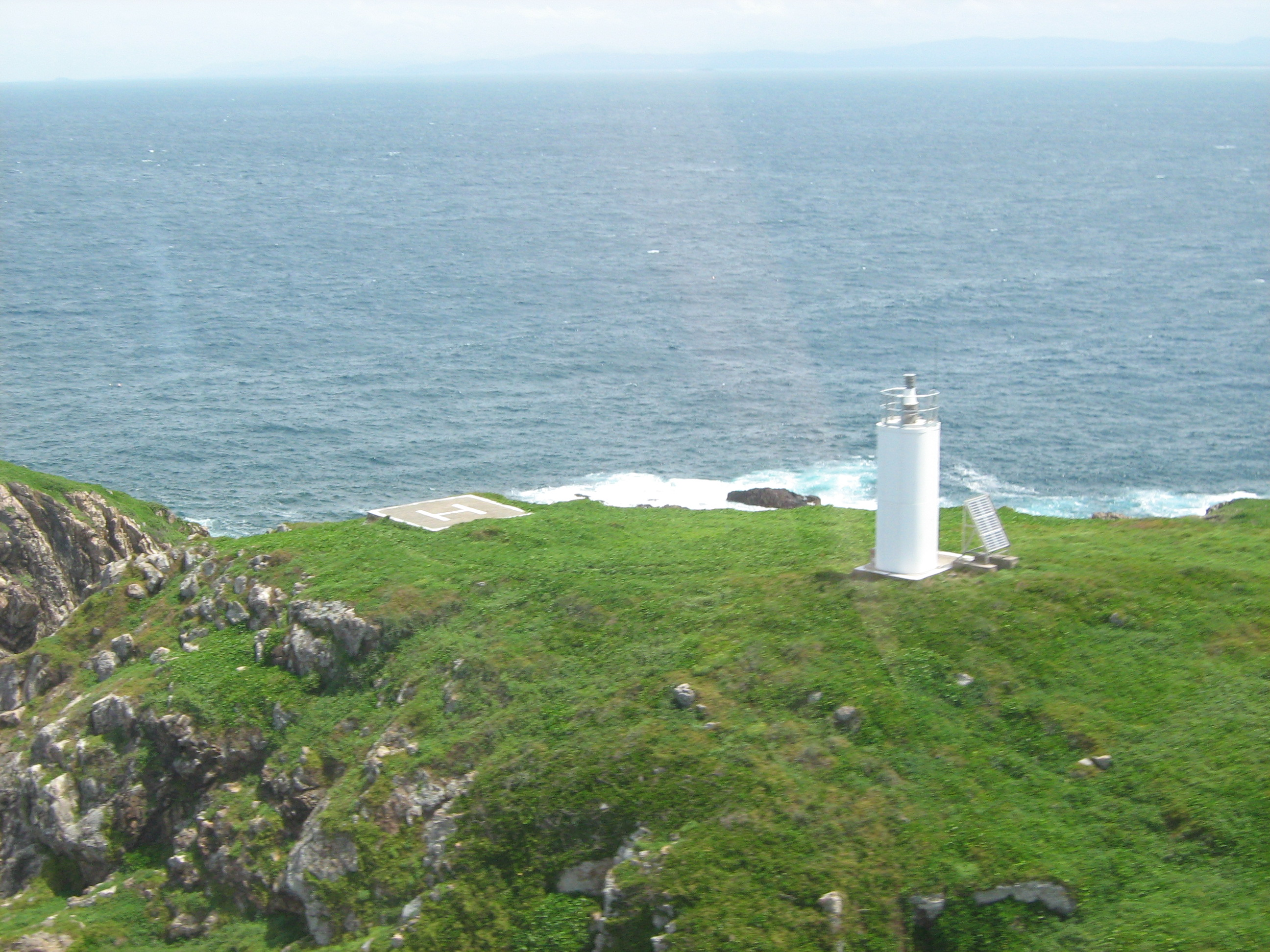
- North Solitary Island Light
- Location: North Solitary Island; New South Wales; Australia
- Coordinates: 29°55′28.56″S 153°23′22.92″E

Tower
- Constructed: 1975
- Construction: fiberglass tower
- Height: 13 feet (4.0 m)
- Shape: cylindrical tower with balcony and no lantern
- Markings: white tower
- Operator: Australian Maritime Safety Authority

Light
- Focal height: 190 feet (58 m)
- Range: 9 nautical miles (17 km)
- Characteristic: Fl (2) W 10s.

North Solitary Island Light is an active lighthouse on North Solitary Island, a large island off the coast of New South Wales, Australia. The light is located on the summit of the island which is on the northern section of the island.

The light shows two white flashes every ten seconds, emitted from a lamp on top of a fiberglass hut with no lantern. It is solar powered and totally automated.

The light is operated by the Australian Maritime Safety Authority, while the site is managed by the New South Wales Maritime Parks Authority as part of the Solitary Islands Marine Park. It is inaccessible to the public.

== See also ==
- List of lighthouses in Australia
