= South Solitary Island Light =

Lighthouse near Coffs Harbour in New South Wales, Australia

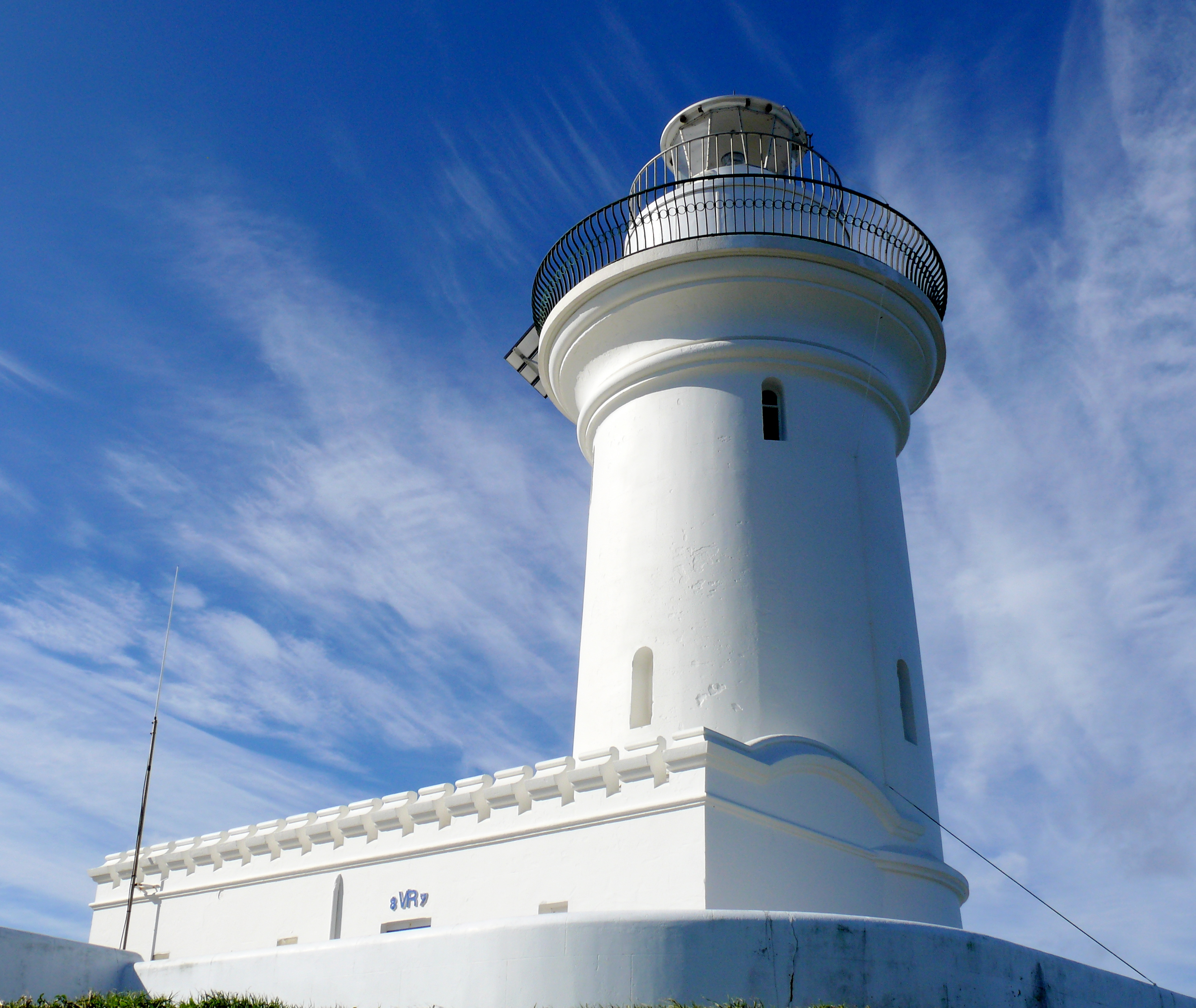
- South Solitary Island Light, 2009
- Location: South Solitary Island; New South Wales; Australia
- Coordinates: 30°12′24.33″S 153°16′2.52″E

Tower
- Constructed: 1880
- Construction: concrete tower
- Automated: 1975
- Height: 66 feet (20 m)
- Shape: cylindrical tower with double balcony and lantern
- Markings: white tower and lantern
- Power source: solar power
- Operator: Australian Maritime Safety Authority
- Heritage: listed on the Register of the National Estate

Light
- Focal height: 190 feet (58 m)
- Lens: 1st order dioptric Fresnel lens
- Intensity: 38,000 cd
- Range: 15 nautical miles (28 km; 17 mi)
- Characteristic: Fl.W. 5s

South Solitary Island Light is an active lighthouse on South Solitary Island, an island within the Solitary Islands Marine Park, about 15 kilometres (9.3 mi) northeast of Coffs Harbour, New South Wales, Australia. The lighthouse is located at the summit of the island. It is considered the most isolated lighthouse on the New South Wales coast. It was first in New South Wales to use kerosene over colza oil, and the last to do so before converting to electric power.

== History ==
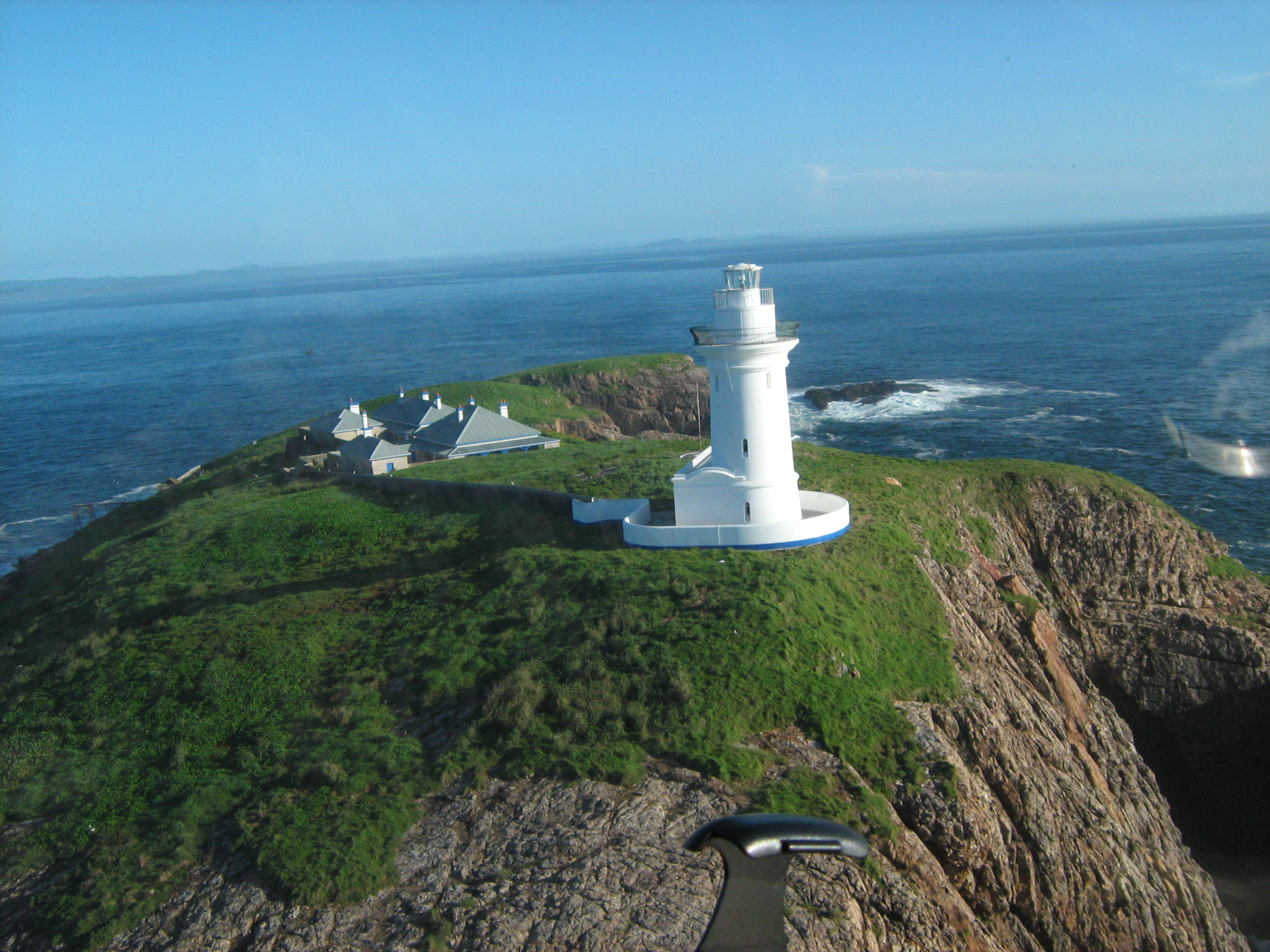
The South Solitary Island Lightstation

Suggestions for a lighthouse near Coffs Harbour were made as early as 1856, with locations proposed on either North Solitary Island or South Solitary Island. It was the shipmasters' preference that set the location to be South Solitary.

The lighthouse was designed by Colonial Architect James Barnet, and it is one of three concrete lighthouses built during that period, the others being Smoky Cape Lighthouse and Green Cape Lighthouse. Barnet had visited the island in October 1877, to determine the best locations for the buildings and the sources for materials. Cement and sand for the construction were transported to the island at harsh conditions, while broken stone was quarried on the island itself. Timber came in small vessels from Bellingen. Though construction was expected to finish by 1879, as the carving "18VR79" on the keystone over the entry doorway suggests, it was first exhibited on 18 March 1880.

The original lens was a Chance Brothers first-order dioptric Fresnel lens, the second of its type to be used in Australia. It is now on display at the Coffs Harbour Jetty.

The original light source was a kerosene burner, the first of its kind in New South Wales, rather than the colza oil ones used by other lighthouses of that period. As other lighthouses upgraded to kerosene, then to carbide lamps, and finally to electricity, South Solitary remained kerosene-operated until 1975, therefore also being the last to use kerosene in New South Wales. The light was displayed at a focal height of 192 feet (59 m) and was visible for 16 nautical miles (30 km; 18 mi).

As of 1934, the intensity of the light was 205,000 candela and the light characteristic was one flash every 30 seconds (Fl W 30s).

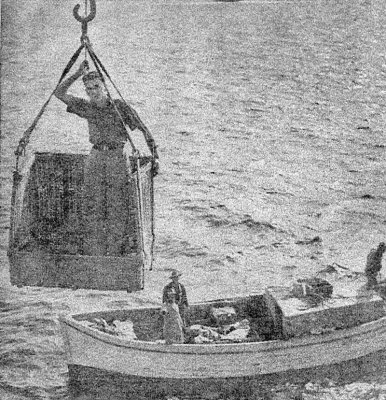
People and supplies being hauled from a launch, 1946

Conditions at the location were harsh due to both the island's isolation and to weather conditions. Originally supplies were sent from Sydney by steamer every fortnight, weather permitting. Later, they arrived more regularly by launch from Coffs Harbour. Due to the slopes, supplies were taken off the launch in a basket lowered by a crane, then hauled up a steep concrete path. The living quarters were lit by kerosene until the 1950s, and coal was used for heating and cooking.

Communication with the mainland was originally by a signal lamp or heliograph. A pedal radio was installed in 1937, enabling communication with the Norah Head Lightstation. That was later replaced by a Bendix radio. Keepers children were taught at first by a governess, who was employed by the keepers, and later by correspondence.

In May 1942, during the Second World War, the lighthouse was extinguished for the only time in its life, because several vessels were torpedoed by enemy submarines near the island.

In 1974, the flagstaff was removed and a helipad was constructed. On 22 August 1975, the lighthouse was electrified, using solar power, and automated, and was officially de-manned on 28 December of that year. The lens was replaced with a modern one, and a workshop-designed fibreglass and aluminium lantern replaced the previous structure. The change lowered the focal height of the light to the current 190 feet (58 m). The old lantern was transported to the Coffs Harbour Regional Museum with a RAAF Chinook helicopter on 7 September 1977. The lighthouse was converted to solar power in 1975.

=== 21st century ===
In 2000, the station was transferred to the National Parks and Wildlife Service. In 2004, the Department of Environment, Climate Change and Water spent $440,000 AUD restoring the buildings, making them weatherproof, secure and better protected from the elements, although not suitable for accommodation.

In 2020, the crumbling cement is being restored and paintwork renewed, in a facelift by the Australian Maritime Safety Authority, costing A$1.5 million.

== Current display ==
The current light source is a solar powered, 12 V 3 amp lamp with an intensity of 38,000 candela. It displays a light characteristic of one white flash every five seconds (Fl.W. 5s) and is visible for 15 nautical miles (28 km; 17 mi). The light is maintained by helicopter.

== Structures ==
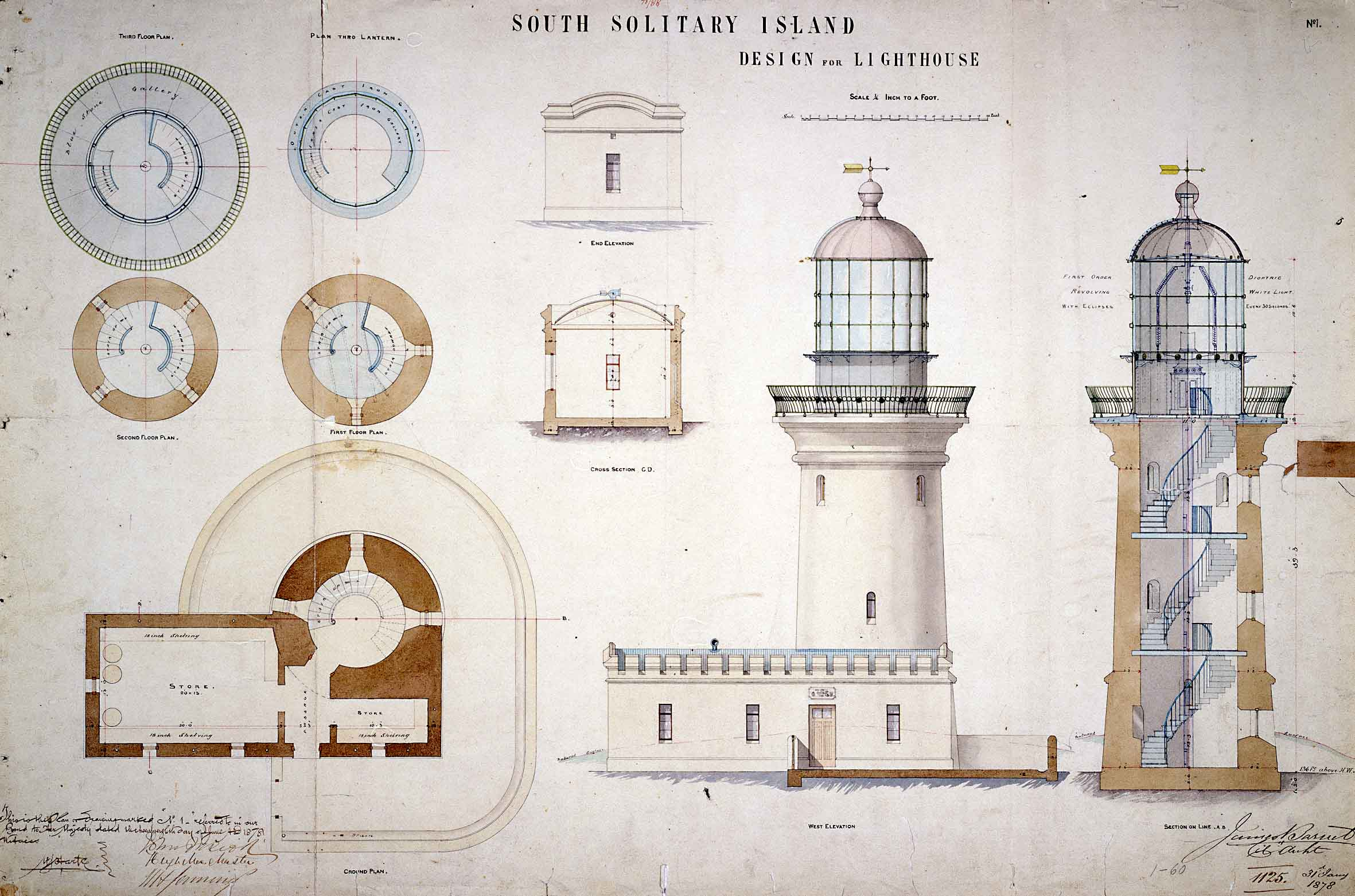
Plans for the lighthouse, 1878

=== The lighthouse ===
The tower is 40 feet (12 m) from the ground to the lantern, made of mass concrete. Its external plan is round, a unique feature as the later two lighthouses of the same series, at Smoky Cape and Green Cape, used an octagonal profile. The internal well is 40 feet (12 m) in diameter. The walls taper from 4 feet 6 inches (1.37 m) at the base to 2 feet 3 inches (0.69 m) at the top. The tower is topped by a concrete oversailing cornice which is capped by the gallery itself, made of sixteen basalt blocks, each weighing 30 long hundredweight (3,400 lb; 1,500 kg), which were shipped from Melbourne. The gallery is surrounded by a gunmetal handrail. Three levels of cast-iron stairs lead to the lantern room on top of the tower. Attached to the tower is a stores annexe.

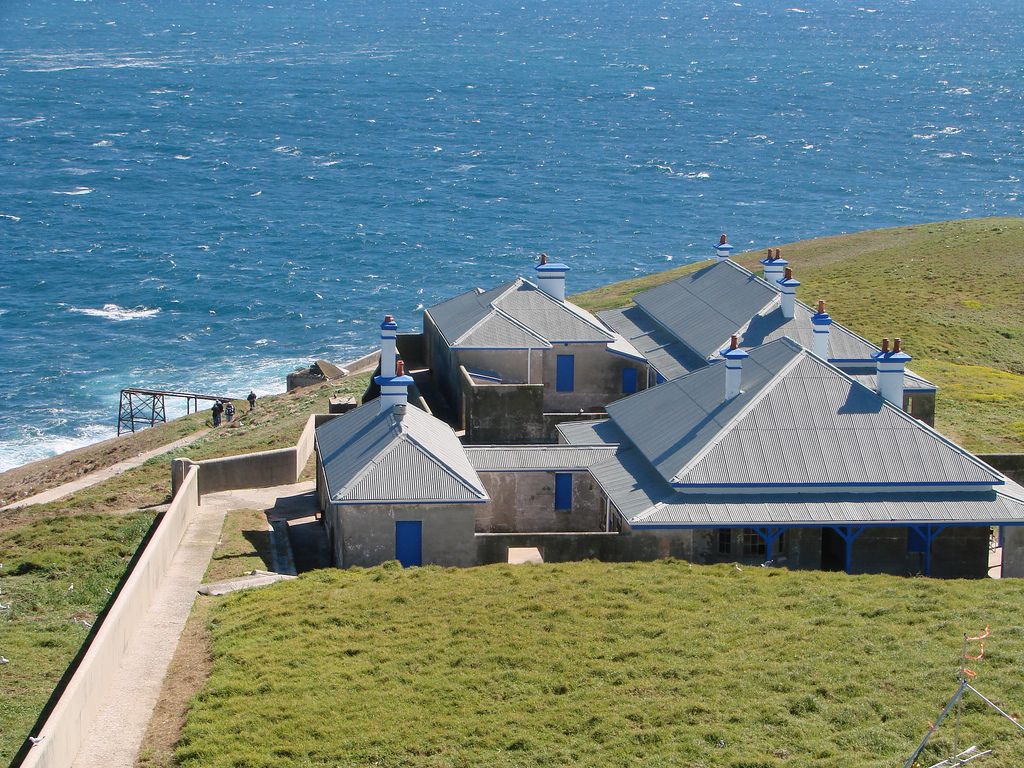
Keepers' cottages, 2008. The jetty and the storehouse are visible on the left

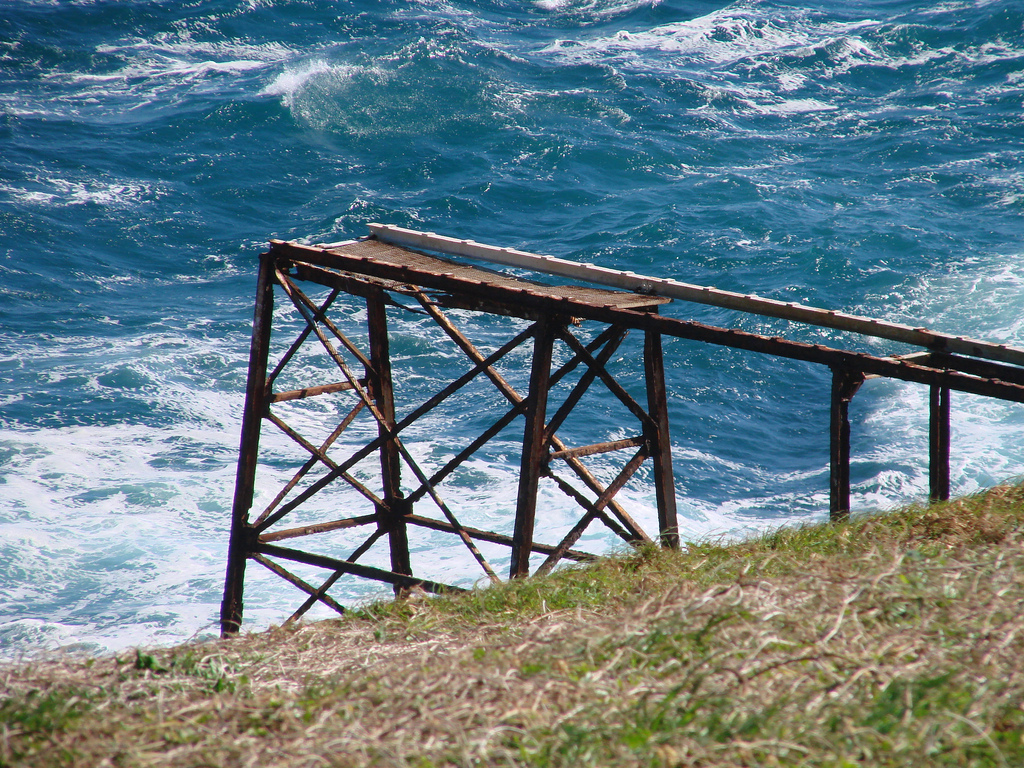
Remains of the jetty, 2008

=== Other structure ===
The lighthouse keepers' residence consists of one chief keeper cottage and two semidetached assistant keeper cottages. They are made of mass concrete, rendered and painted. The residence is surrounded by high stone walls as protection from weather conditions. A high stone wall also runs from the houses to the lighthouse. There is also a room near the residence which served as a little schoolhouse, with a governess teaching the children of the keepers.

Also at the premises are the remains of a 13 metres (43 ft) above sea level jetty, the third to be constructed. The first jetty was constructed in 1878 during the construction of the lighthouse, and was only 5 metres (16 ft) high. It was destroyed in 1904 and a larger jetty was built. This second jetty was repaired and reconstructed multiple times, in 1913–1915 and 1932. Finally, the third jetty was built in 1959. The shore end of the jetty was demolished in 1986. As of 2008 the jetty still stands, though most of it has rusted and fallen into the sea. A small storehouse in poor shape stands next to the jetty. The storehouse is the oldest building on the island, being constructed in 1879–1880.

== Site operation and visiting ==
The light is operated by the Australian Maritime Safety Authority, while the site is managed by the New South Wales Maritime Parks Authority as part of the Solitary Islands Marine Park. It is usually inaccessible to the public, though it can be seen by boat tours from Coffs Harbour. The island is open for tours two weekends every year. Travel is by helicopter only, and the tours are guided by National Parks and Wildlife rangers.

== See also ==
- List of lighthouses in Australia
- South Solitary, a film set on the island and lighthouse
