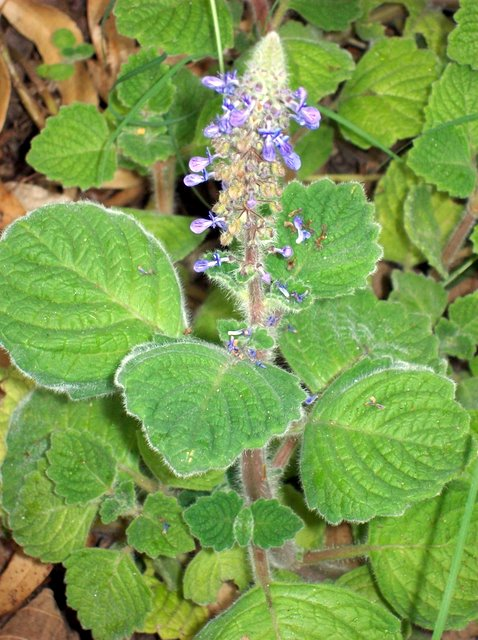
- At the Royal Botanic Gardens, Sydney, Australia

Conservation status
- Endangered (EPBC Act)

Scientific classification
- Kingdom: Plantae
- Clade: Tracheophytes
- Clade: Angiosperms
- Clade: Eudicots
- Clade: Asterids
- Order: Lamiales
- Family: Lamiaceae
- Genus: Coleus
- Species: C. cremnus

Binomial name
- Coleus cremnus (B.J.Conn) A.J.Paton

Synonyms
- Plectranthus cremnus B.J.Conn

= Coleus cremnus =

Species of flowering plant

Coleus cremnus, synonym Plectranthus cremnus, is a rare herb only found in a few sites in the north coast of New South Wales. It occurs in shallow sandy soils in rocky coastal headlands, although in recent years, its habitat is under threat from the invasive species bitou bush. Visually, C. cremnus can be easily confused with its relatives Coleus graveolens and Coleus australis.

== Description ==
C. cremnus is a herbaceous plant whose stems and leaves grow low, rather than stand upright. The body and leaves are covered in a thin layer of hairs. When touched or crushed, the plant omits a Geranium-like smell. It can grow to a total of 30 cm in height and spread to 2 m across.

Plectranthus cremnus seedling

The petioles can be 15–25 mm long, and the leaves can be 35–40 mm long and 45–50 mm wide. The leaf's shape is blunt and its edges have a scalloped pattern. Inflorescence can be up to 150 mm long.

C. cremnus can appear similar to other plants in its genus Coleus. For instance, it can be confused with Coleus australis, but can be distinguished from C. australis by its odor; when crushed, C. australis has a medicinal scent. In addition, it can appear close to Coleus graveolens, but can be distinguished by its pleasant odor and having less scalloping on the leaf edges.

C. cremnus can flower throughout the year, but it does so most commonly in warmer months. Its flowers are light blue or purple.

Plectranthus cremnus flowerhead

== Distribution ==
C. cremnus is a rare herb, found only in the northern coastal portion of New South Wales. It has been found in communities such as Evans Head, Lennox Head, South Solitary Island, and Sawtell. C. cremnus prefers to grow in shallow, sandy soil, and it has been found in sand dunes.

C. cremnus's conservation status is uncertain. It is most common at Lennox Head, but it is vulnerable throughout New South Wales. It has been cultivated at the Royal Botanic Gardens in Sydney. C. cremnus has a ROTAP code of 3k, which means it exists in a wide region but in small populations.

=== Threats ===
In 2006, it was determined that C. cremnus is one of the native plants at risk due to the spread of bitou bush. The bitou bush stabilizes the sand, reducing the amount of wind-blown soil that can land in rocky areas and provide a place for C. cremnus to grow. Other major threats to C. cremnus include Australian beach goers who may trample on the plant, and the aerial application of herbicides.

== History ==
C. cremnus was first described in 1992, under the name Plectranthus cremnus. The species name "cremnus" comes from the Ancient Greek for "cliff" and refers to the plant's tendency to grow on coastal rocky cliffs. It was later renamed to be under the genus Coleus, after a phylogenetic study.
