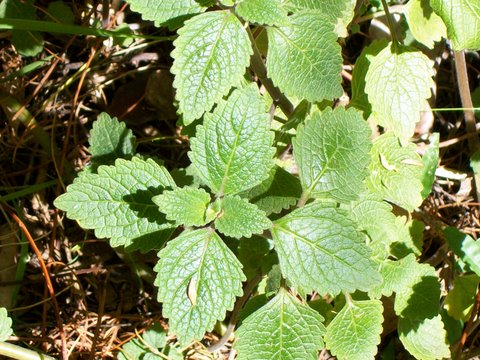
- At Eastwood, New South Wales, Australia

Scientific classification
- Kingdom: Plantae
- Clade: Tracheophytes
- Clade: Angiosperms
- Clade: Eudicots
- Clade: Asterids
- Order: Lamiales
- Family: Lamiaceae
- Genus: Coleus
- Species: C. australis

Binomial name
- Coleus australis (R.Br.) A.J.Paton

Synonyms
- Plectranthus australis R.Br; Plectranthus parviflorus var. australis (R.Br.) Briq.; Plectranthus parviforus Willd., non Coleus parviflorus Benth.

= Coleus australis =

Species of flowering plant

Coleus australis, synonyms Plectranthus australis and Plectranthus parviflorus, known as little spurflower or cockspur flower, is a shrub, occurring in Polynesia and Australia. Non aromatic, between 10 and 70 cm high. The habitat is shady moist areas, including eucalyptus forest and rainforest. A widespread species, in rocky areas and beside streams. Attractive blue and white flowers may occur throughout the year.

== Names ==
Coleus australis has many names, both scientific and those used by the cultural communities it is used by. In Hawaii, the plant is called ʻAlaʻala wai nui wahine, where ʻAlaʻala refers to a cephalopod's ink sac, wai to water, and nui to largeness. It has been assumed this refers to the plant's medicinal usage.

It has also been called Swedish ivy.

== Description ==
Coleus australis grows wide and low, spreading up to 4 feet long. It has partially woody stems. The leaves and stems are covered in soft hairs. The leaves are scalloped on the edges.

The flowers can be light blue, white, or purple and look characteristic of the flowers of the Lamiaceae family. It produces a brown nut-like fruit with seeds inside. The flowers have a citrus odor.

Coleus australis can be confused with its relative C. cremnus. They can be distinguished by odor; when crushed, C. australis has a medicinal scent, but C. cremnus has a floral Geranium-like smell.

Plectranthus australis

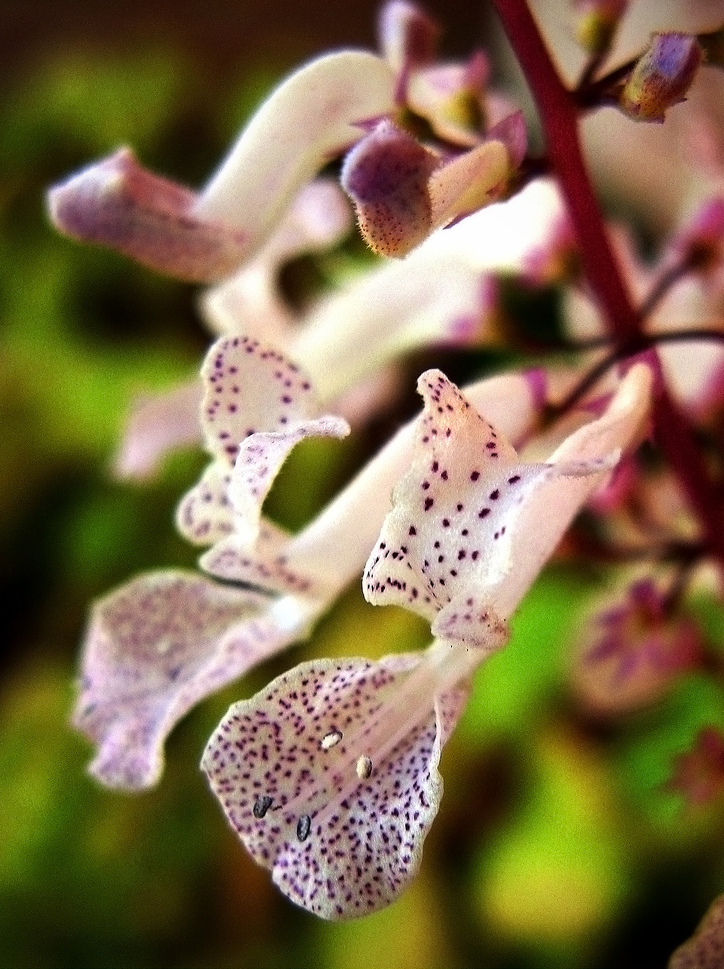
Flowers

Seed heads

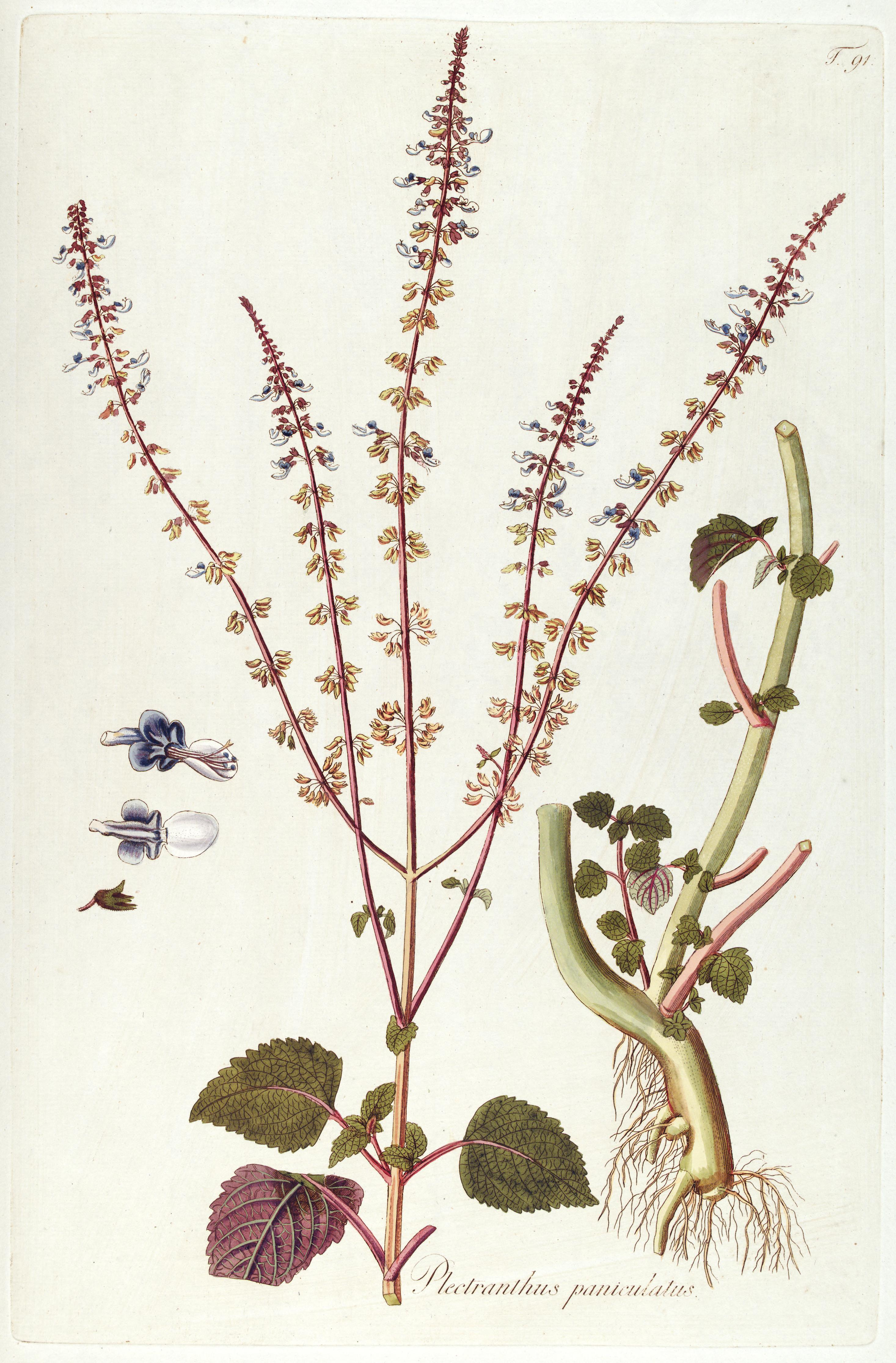
Botanical illustration

Leaves

Cliffside habitat

== Distribution ==
Habitat in Maui

C. australis is found in a wide distribution, across Australia, Papua New Guinea, and Polynesia. C. australis prefers to grow in dry, rocky areas. It tolerates drought, frost, and heat well. Within Hawaii, it is found on every island except Kahoʻolawe.

== Uses ==
C. australis is used as an ornamental plant. It lives for a long time and can be easily grown as a ground cover plant, or in a hanging container. The plant will attract pollinator insects like bees and butterflies. It can be used in traditional Hawaiian leis due to its long-lasting flower and citrus smell.
