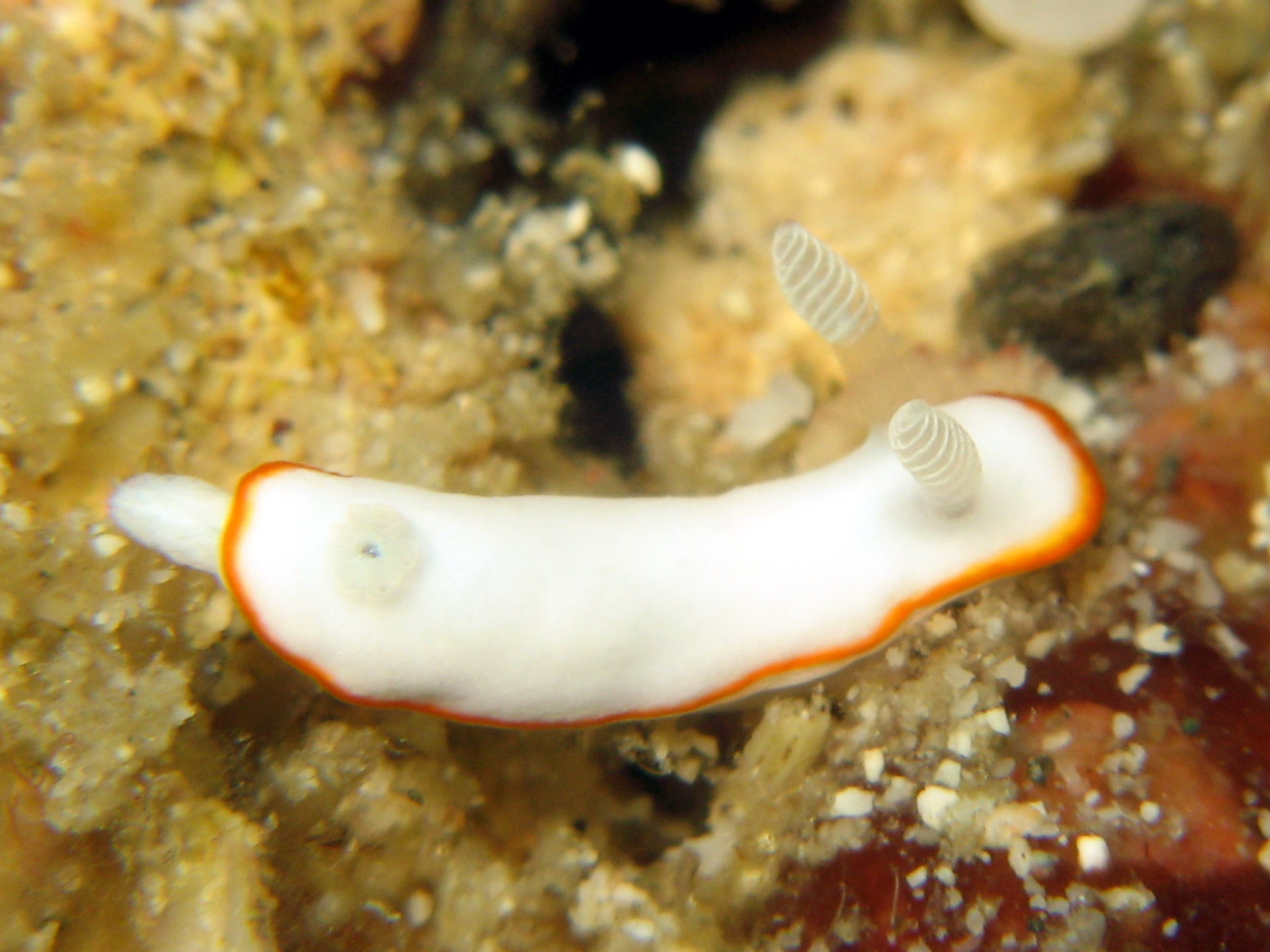

Scientific classification
- Kingdom: Animalia
- Phylum: Mollusca
- Class: Gastropoda
- Order: Nudibranchia
- Family: Chromodorididae
- Genus: Goniobranchus
- Species: G. albonares

Binomial name
- Goniobranchus albonares (Rudman, 1990)

Synonyms
- Chromodoris albonares Rudman, 1990 (basionym)

= Goniobranchus albonares =

Species of gastropod

Goniobranchus albonares is a species of colourful sea slug, a dorid nudibranch, a marine gastropod mollusc in the family Chromodorididae.

== Distribution ==
This species was described from North West Solitary Island, Coffs Harbour, New South Wales, Australia. It has been reported from New Caledonia, Bali and Japan and the Marshall Islands.
