= Muttonbird Island Nature Reserve =

Nature reserve in Australia

Coordinates: 30°18′19″S 153°09′06″E

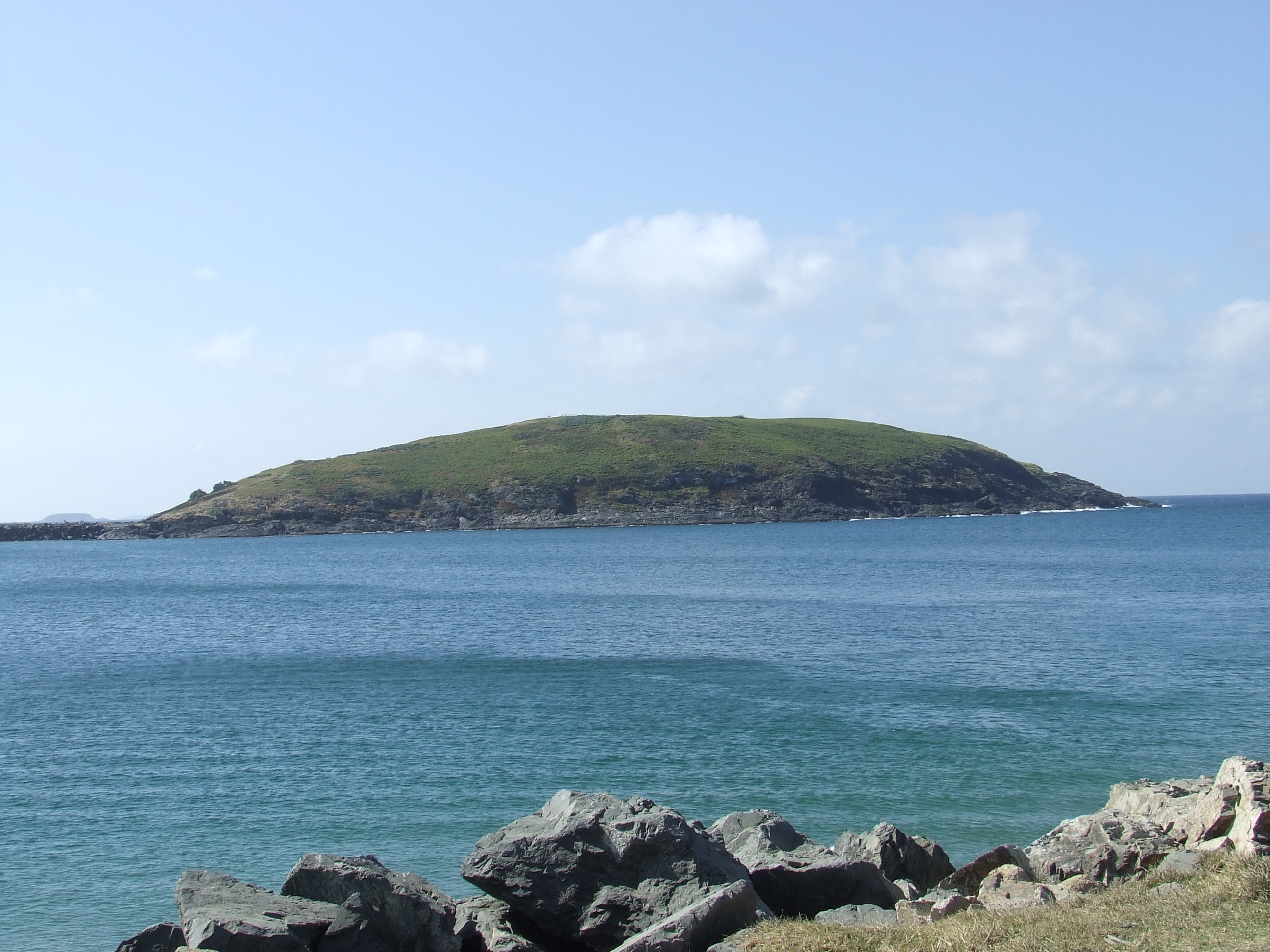

Muttonbird Island Nature Reserve is a nature reserve off the shore of Coffs Harbour, New South Wales, Australia, on the southern boundary of the Solitary Islands Marine Park. It is linked to the mainland by a causeway, which acts as the northern breakwater for the harbour. With over 5,500 breeding pairs, it is a major breeding ground for wedge-tailed shearwaters (Ardenna pacifica), known locally as muttonbirds, which migrate annually to the Philippines but return to breed on the island.
