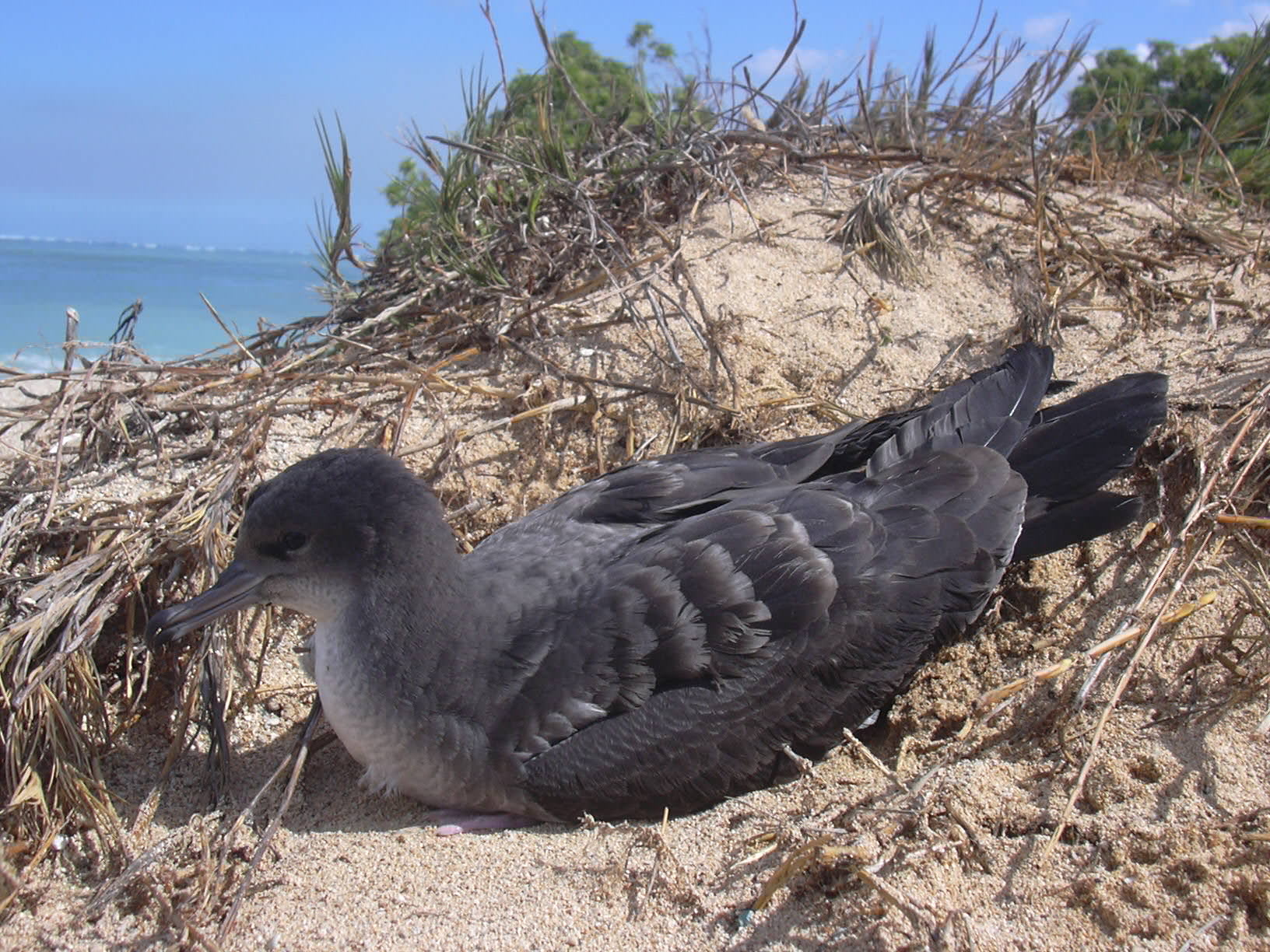

Conservation status
- Least Concern (IUCN 3.1)

Scientific classification
- Kingdom: Animalia
- Phylum: Chordata
- Class: Aves
- Order: Procellariiformes
- Family: Procellariidae
- Genus: Ardenna
- Species: A. pacifica

Binomial name
- Ardenna pacifica (Gmelin, JF, 1789)
- Nonbreeding Breeding

Synonyms
- Procellaria pacifica (protonym) Puffinus pacificus

Audio
- Pair "singing", Lady Elliot Island, Queensland, Australia

= Wedge-tailed shearwater =

Species of bird

The wedge-tailed shearwater (Ardenna pacifica) (Uau Kani or Koto in Hawaiian) is a medium-large shearwater in the seabird family Procellariidae. It is one of the shearwater species that is sometimes referred to as a muttonbird, like the sooty shearwater of New Zealand and the short-tailed shearwater of Australia. It is found throughout the tropical Pacific and Indian Oceans, roughly between latitudes 35°N and 35°S. It breeds on the islands off Japan, on the Islas Revillagigedo, the Hawaiian Islands, the Seychelles, the Northern Mariana Islands, and off Eastern and Western Australia.

Its Hawaiian name "Uau Kani" reflects the sound of their bird call. Native Hawaiians had sometimes named birds after the nature of their melody.

== Taxonomy ==
The wedge-tailed shearwater was formally described in 1789 by the German naturalist Johann Friedrich Gmelin in his revised and expanded edition of Carl Linnaeus's Systema Naturae. He placed it with the petrels in the genus Procellaria and coined the binomial name Procellaria pacifica. Gmelin based his description on the "Pacific petrel" that had been described in 1785 by the English ornithologist John Latham in his book A General Synopsis of Birds. The type locality was designated as the Kermadec Islands by Gregory Mathews in 1912. The wedge-tailed shearwater is now one of seven species placed in the genus Ardenna that introduced in 1853 by Ludwig Reichenbach. The species is monotypic: no subspecies are recognised. A molecular phylogenetic study published in 2022 found that the wedge-tailed shearwater was sister to Buller's shearwater.

== Description ==
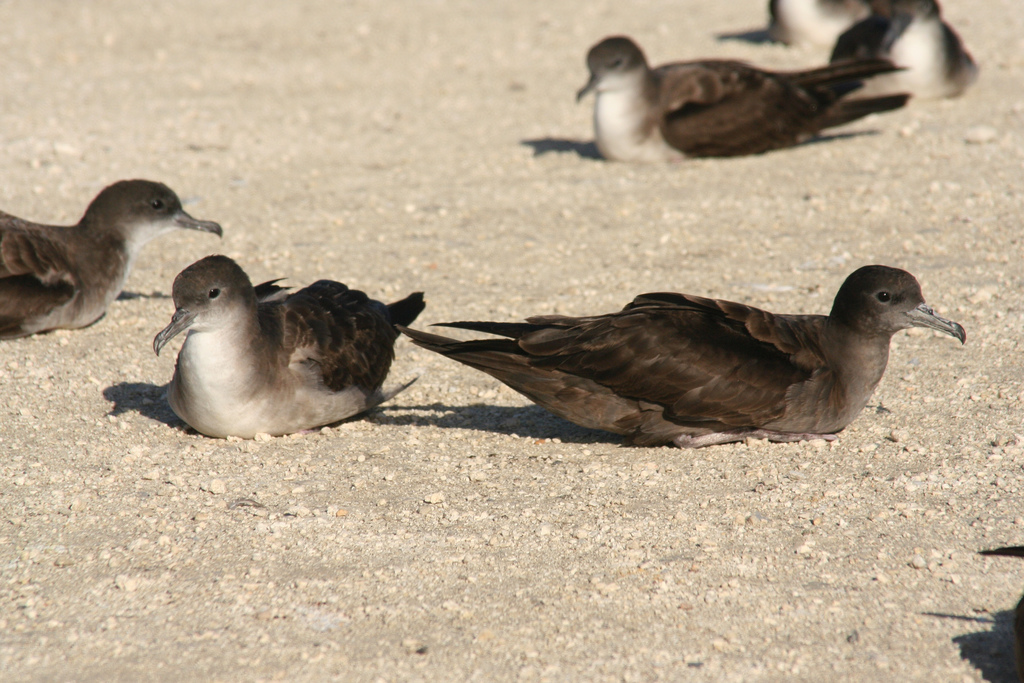
The pale morph and dark morphs side by side

The wedge-tailed shearwater is the largest of the tropical shearwaters. The two colour morphs of the species are dark and pale; the pale morphs predominate in the North Pacific, the dark morph elsewhere. However, both morphs exist in all populations, and bear no relation to sex or breeding condition. The pale morph has grey-brown plumage on the back, head, and upper wing, and whiter plumage below. The darker morph has the same dark grey-brown plumage over the whole body. The species' common name is derived from the large, wedge-shaped tail, which may help the species glide. The bill is dark and legs are salmon pink, with the legs set far back on the body (in common with the other shearwaters) as an adaptation for swimming.

This species is related to the pan-Pacific Buller's shearwater, which differs much in colour pattern, but also has a wedge tail and a thin, black bill. They make up the Thyellodroma group, a superspecies of the large shearwaters that were for a long time included in the genus Puffinus.

== Behaviour and ecology ==
=== Food and feeding ===
Wedge-tailed shearwaters feed pelagically on fish, squid, and crustaceans. Their diet is 66% fish, of which the most commonly taken is goatfish. The species was thought to mostly take food from surface feeding, but observations of feeding wedge-tails suggested that contact-dipping, where birds flying close to the surface snatch prey from the water was the most commonly used hunting technique. However, a 2001 study which deployed maximum depth recorders found that 83% of wedge-tails dived during foraging trips with a mean maximum depth of 14 m (46 ft) and that they could achieve a depth of 66 m (217 ft).

=== Breeding ===
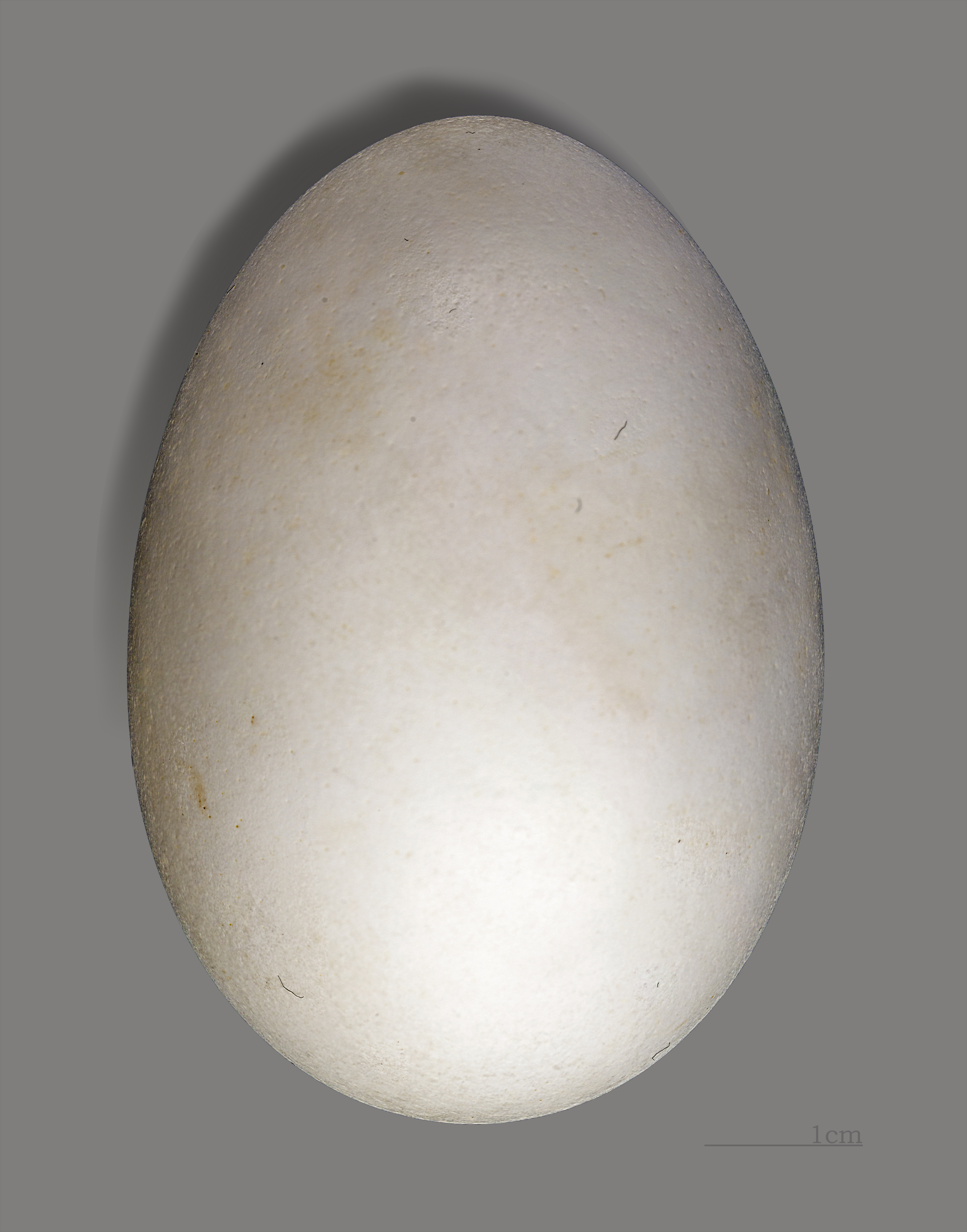
Egg, Muséum de Toulouse)

The wedge-tailed shearwater breeds in colonies on small tropical islands. Breeding seasons vary depending on location, with synchronised breeding seasons more common at higher latitudes. Northern Hemisphere birds begin breeding around February, and Southern Hemisphere birds begin around September. Wedge-tailed shearwaters display natal philopatry, returning to their natal colony to begin breeding at the age of four.

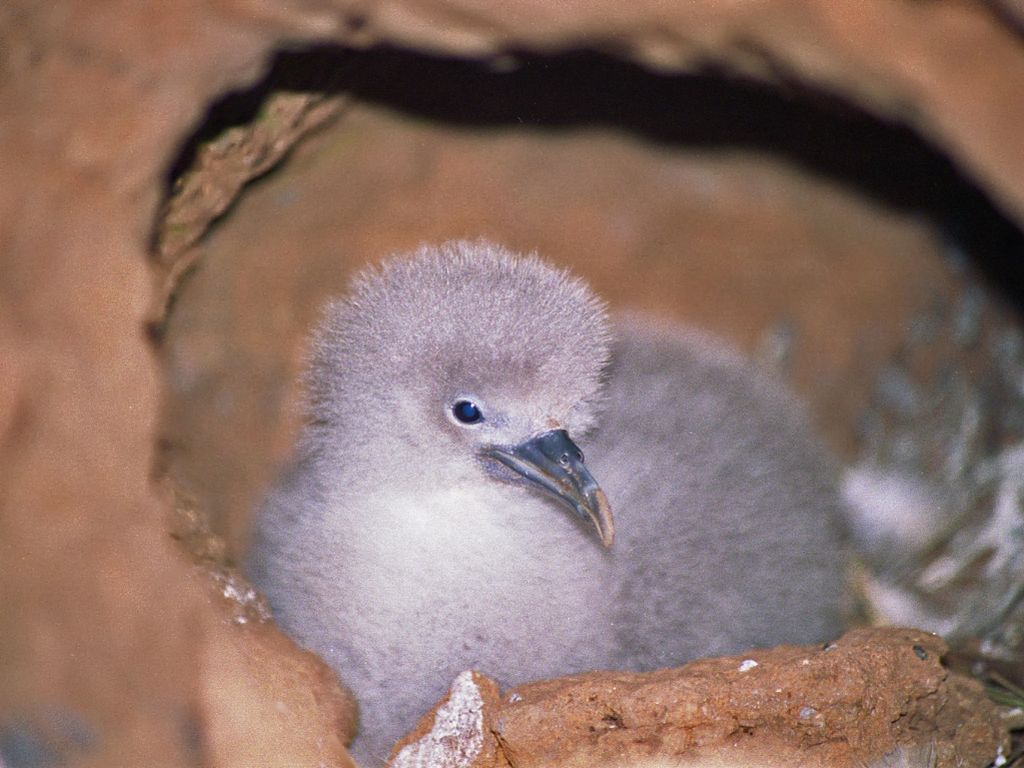
Chick in burrow, Kilauea Point National Wildlife Refuge

Wedge-tailed shearwaters are monogamous, forming a pair bond that lasts for several years. Divorce between pairs occurs after breeding seasons that end in failure. Nesting occurs either in burrows or sometimes on the surface under cover. Pairs call frequently as a pair, both to reinforce the pair bond and warn intruders away from their territory. Parents also call to their chicks. The call is long, with an inhaling component (OOO) and exhaling component (err); their Hawaiian name 'ua'u kani means moaning petrel. Both sexes participate in digging a burrow, or repairing the burrow from last year. Nesting burrows of other species are also used. The breeding season of the Bonin petrel in Hawaii is timed to avoid that of the wedge-tail; in years where Bonin petrel chicks are still in burrows when wedge-tails return to begin breeding, these chicks are killed or evicted. It attends these colonies nocturnally, although nonbreeding wedge-tails are often seen at the surface throughout the day and breeding birds rest outside their burrows before laying.

Both sexes undertake a prelaying exodus to build up energy reserves; this usually lasts around 28 days. A single egg is laid, if that egg is lost, then the pair will not attempt another that season. After laying, the male usually undertakes the first incubation stint. Both sexes incubate the egg, in stints that can last up to 13 days. Incubation takes around 50 days. After hatching, the chick is brooded for up to 6 days, until it is able to thermoregulate, after which it is left alone in the nest while both parents hunt for food. It is initially fed with stomach oil, an energy-rich, waxy oil of digested prey created in the parent's gut; later, it is fed both solids and stomach oil. Like many procellariids, wedge-tailed shearwater parents alternate long and short trips to provide food, with the parents alternating between short foraging trips (1–4 days) and long trips (about 8 days), the two parents coordinating their feeding effort. Chicks increase in size to 560 g (20 oz) (larger than the adults), then drop to around 430 g (15 oz) before fledging. Fledging occurs after 103–115 days, after which the chick is independent of the adult.

Known breeding colonies include:

- Pacific Missile Range Facility, Kauai, Hawaii
- Heron Island, Australia
- Lady Elliot Island, Australia
- Lady Musgrave Island, Australia
- Lord Howe Island, Australia
- Montague Island, Southern New South Wales, Australia
- North West Island, Australia
- Muttonbird Island, Coffs Harbour, Northern New South Wales, Australia
- Mānana Island, Hawaii, United States
- Maui, Hawaii, United States
- Mokuauia Island, Hawaii, United States
- Kupikipiki'o Pt., Hawaii, United States
- Ilot Maitre, Noumea, New Caledonia
- Round Island, Mauritius
- Ka'ena Point, Oahu, Hawaii
- Mañagaha, Saipan, CNMI
- San Benedicto Island, Revillagigedo Islands, Mexico
- Alphonse Island, Republic of Seychelles
- Bijoutier Island, Republic of Seychelles

== Gallery ==
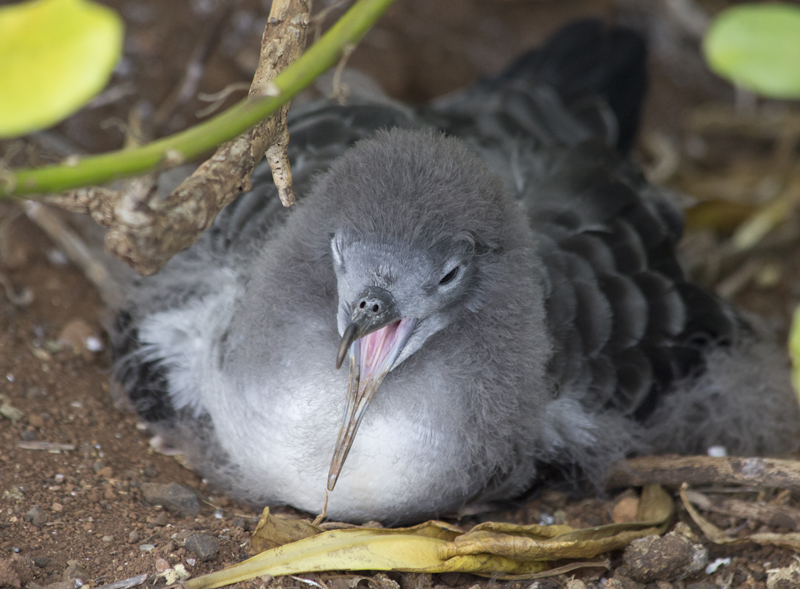
Juvenile, Kilauea, Kauai, Hawaii

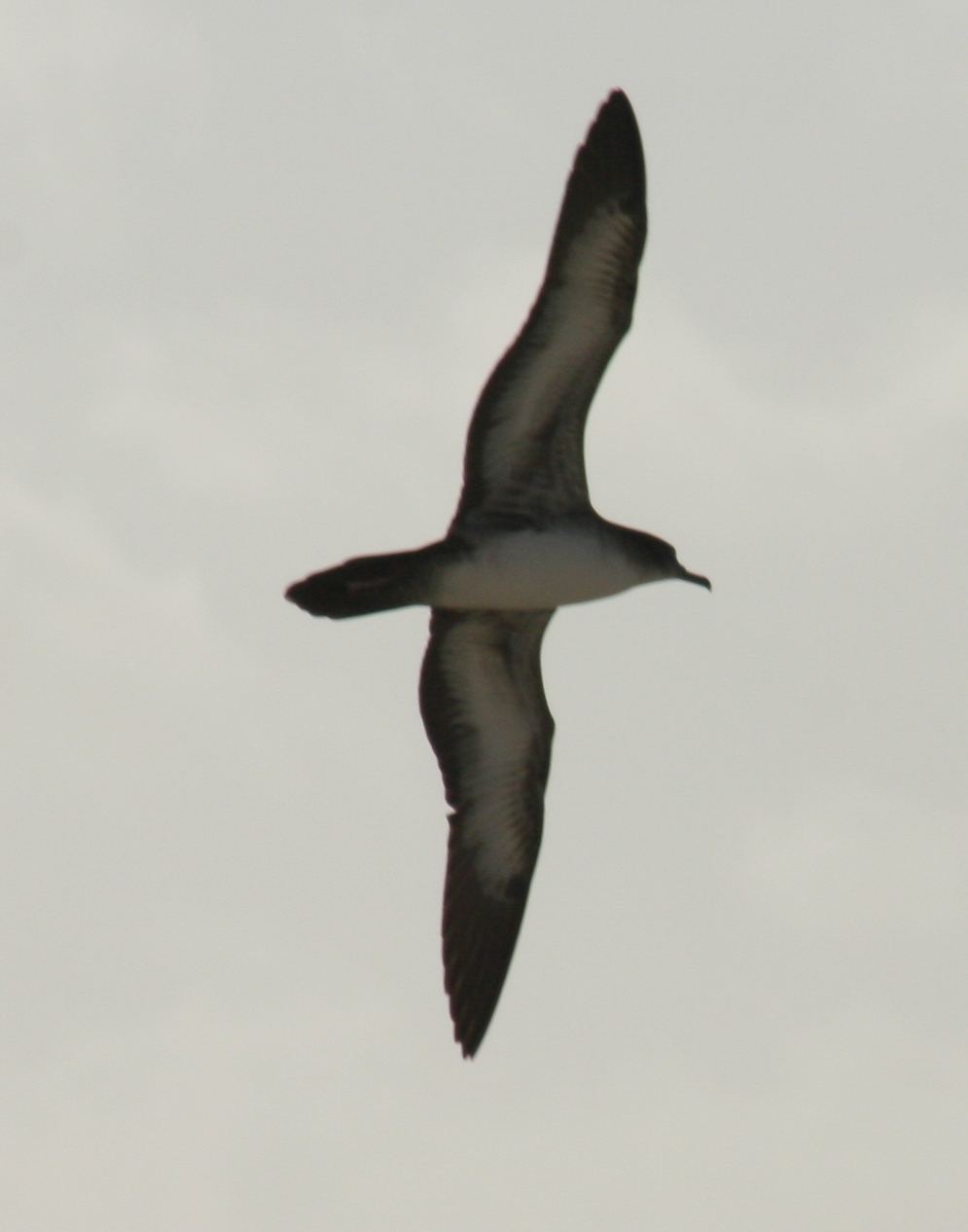
Profile in flight, Hawaiian Islands
