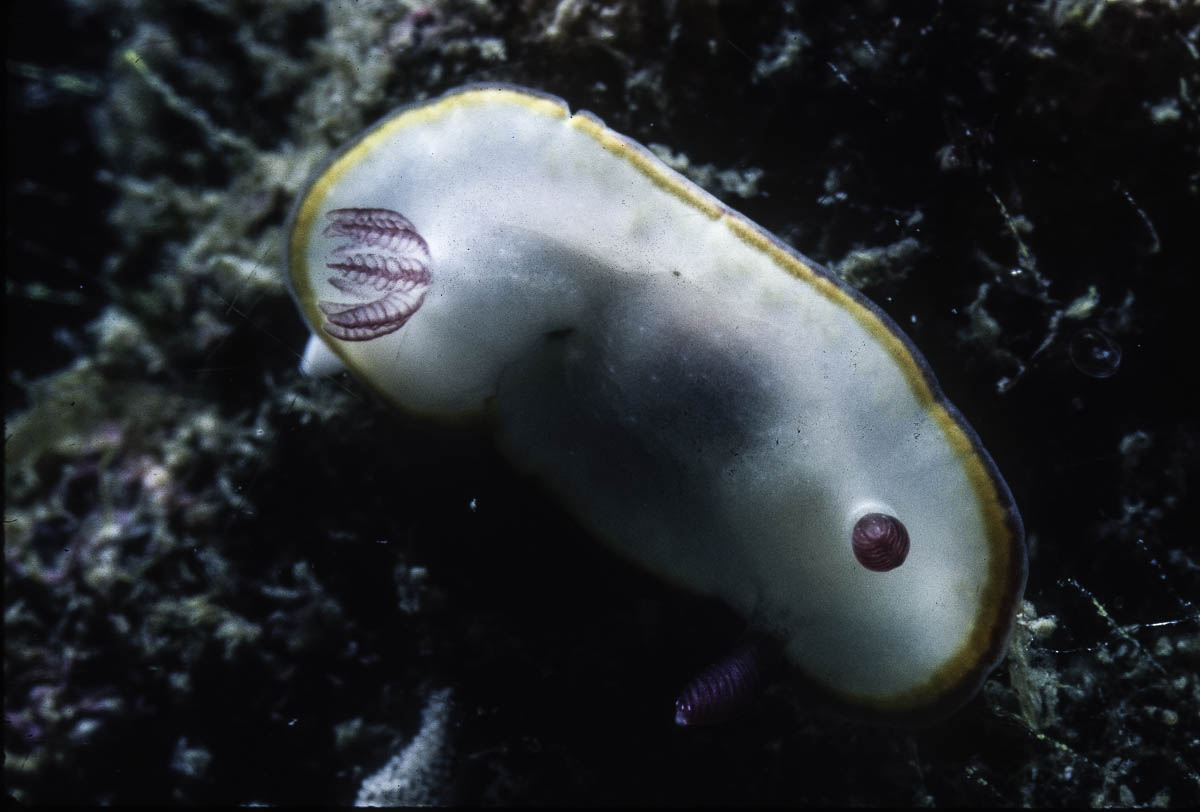
- The nudibranch Goniobranchus sinensis, Mirs Bay, Hong Kong.

Scientific classification
- Kingdom: Animalia
- Phylum: Mollusca
- Class: Gastropoda
- Order: Nudibranchia
- Family: Chromodorididae
- Genus: Goniobranchus
- Species: G. sinensis

Binomial name
- Goniobranchus sinensis (Rudman, 1985)

Synonyms
- Chromodoris sinensis Rudman, 1985 (basionym)

= Goniobranchus sinensis =

Species of gastropod

Goniobranchus sinensis is a species of colourful sea slug, a dorid nudibranch, a marine gastropod mollusc in the family Chromodorididae.

== Distribution ==
This marine species was described from Hong Kong. It also occurs in Japan and has been reported from Indonesia and Malaysia.

== Description ==
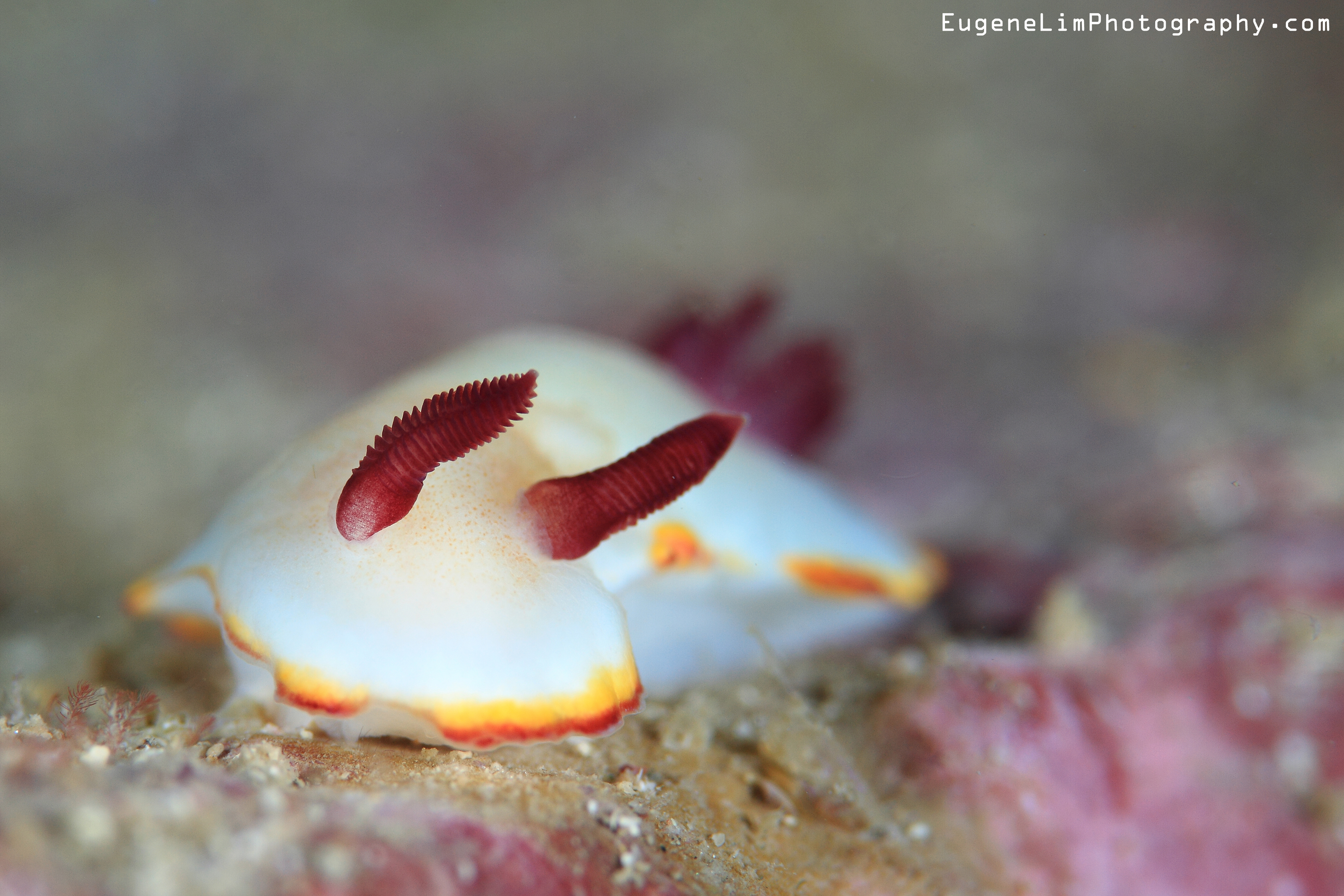
Head of Goniobranchus sinensis showing cherry red rhinophores.

Goniobranchus sinensis is a chromodorid nudibranch with a semi-translucent white mantle and coloured margin. In this species there is a yellow band, then a red marginal band with a narrow opaque white band at the very edge of the mantle. The rhinophores and gills are cherry red. The body reaches a length of 20 mm.
