= North Solitary Island =

Island in New South Wales, Australia

Coordinates: 29°55′43″S 153°23′28″E

North Solitary Island is one of the largest islands found off the New South Wales coast and inside the continental shelf. It is located 40 km north-east of Coffs Harbour and about 13 km east-south-east of Wooli. The island is divided into two sections by a channel. An automated lighthouse is found on the northern section of the island.

Around 500 metres north of the island is North West Rock which is home to the fish aggregation site called Fish Soup.

The island is part of the Solitary Islands Marine Park established 2 January 1998 and managed by the NSW Maritime Parks Authority.

Rocks on North Solitary Island consist of mudstone and a light green brittle sillicaceous argillite. The argillite probably formed from volcanic ash falls. The strike of the beds is between 120° and 170° with steep dipping to the west. Some beds show graded bedding. Rocks are frequently folded, and there are also several small faults. Tectonically it is part of the Coffs Harbour Block which in turn is part of the New England Orogen.
