= South West Solitary Island =

Island in New South Wales, Australia

Coordinates: 30.161°S 153.227°E

South West Solitary Island or Groper Island is an island found off the New South Wales North coast and inside the continental shelf. It is located 18 km north-east of Coffs Harbour and about 18 km south-south-east of Woolgoolga.

The island is part of the Solitary Islands Marine Park established 2 January 1998 and managed by the NSW Maritime Parks Authority.

Rocks on South West Solitary Island consist of repeating beds of mudstone and sandstone. The sandstone is medium to coarse grained. Some beds are 5 to 10 cm thick, whereas others are up to 3 m thick. The strike of the beds is between 350° and 60° with dipping at 41° to 67°. There is an anticline with syncline on the southwest of the island. Tectonically it is part of the Coffs Harbour Block which in turn is part of the New England Orogen.
