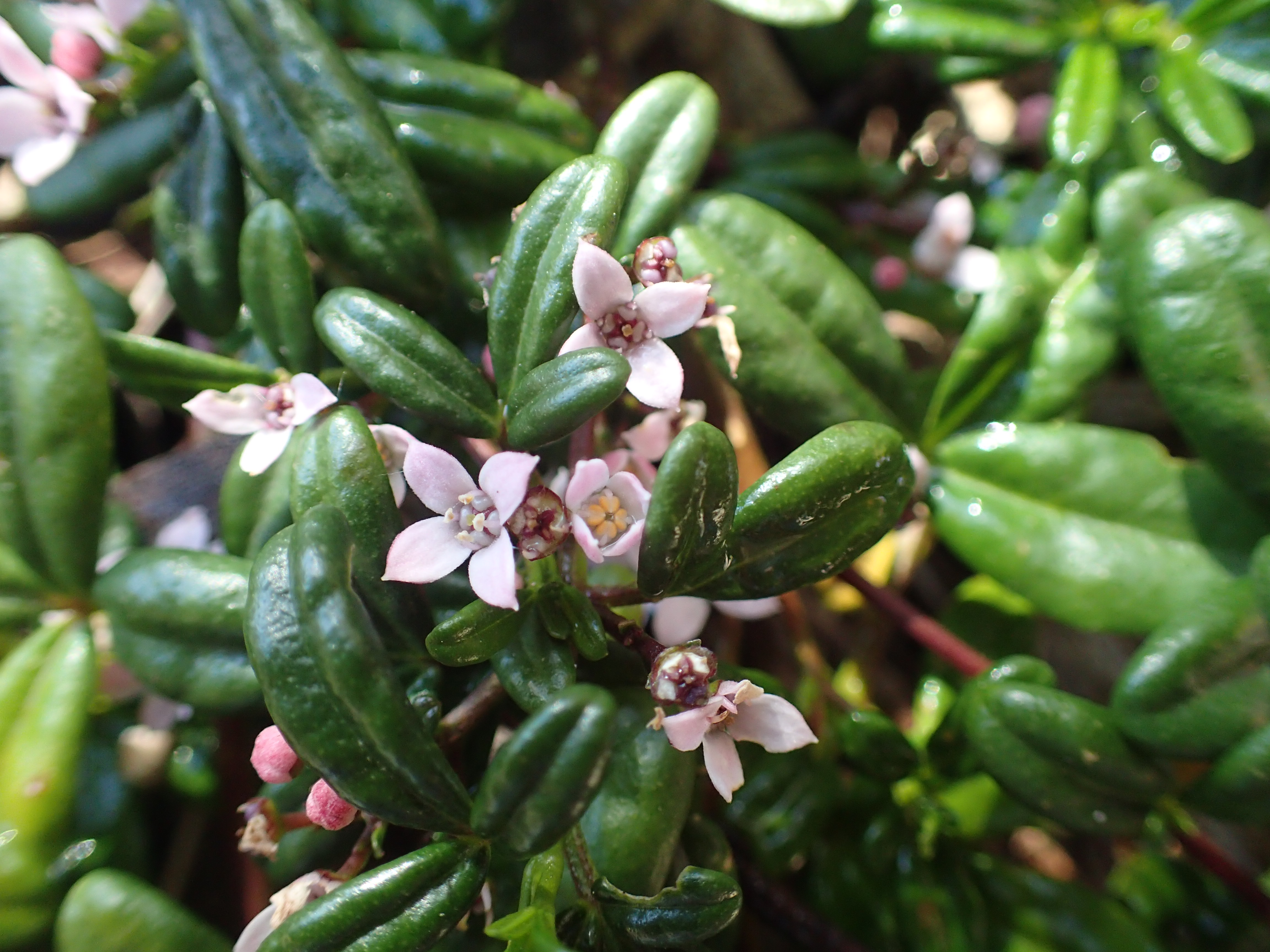
- In the Australian National Botanic Gardens

Conservation status
- Endangered (EPBC Act)

Scientific classification
- Kingdom: Plantae
- Clade: Tracheophytes
- Clade: Angiosperms
- Clade: Eudicots
- Clade: Rosids
- Order: Sapindales
- Family: Rutaceae
- Genus: Zieria
- Species: Z. prostrata

Binomial name
- Zieria prostrata J.A.Armstr.

= Zieria prostrata =

Headland zieria

Species of flowering plant

Zieria prostrata commonly known as headland zieria, is a plant in the citrus family Rutaceae. It is endemic to the Coffs Harbour district in New South Wales (Australia). It is a prostrate shrub with leaves composed of three leaflets, and flowers with four pink to white petals. It is only known from four headlands and is classified as an endangered species.

== Description ==
Zieria prostrata is a prostrate or low, scrambling shrub with glabrous, ridged branches and which grows to a height of 0.5–1 m (2–3 ft). Its leaves are composed of three narrow oval leaflets with the middle leaflet 10–16 mm (0.4–0.6 in) long and 4–6 mm (0.16–0.24 in) wide and the others smaller. Both surfaces of the leaf are the same colour, dotted with oil glands and glabrous, with a stalk 3–4 mm (0.1–0.2 in) long.

The flowers are pink in the bud stage but turn white as they open. They are arranged in groups of mostly 3 to 7 (sometimes up to 32) in leaf axils and the groups are usually much shorter than the leaves. The four sepal lobes are about 0.5 mm (0.02 in) long, the four petals are 2–2.5 mm (0.08–0.1 in) long and in common with other zierias, there are only four stamens. Flowering mainly occurs from late August to late September or October and is followed by fruit which is a follicle composed of up to four sections joined at the base and which burst open to release their seeds when ripe.

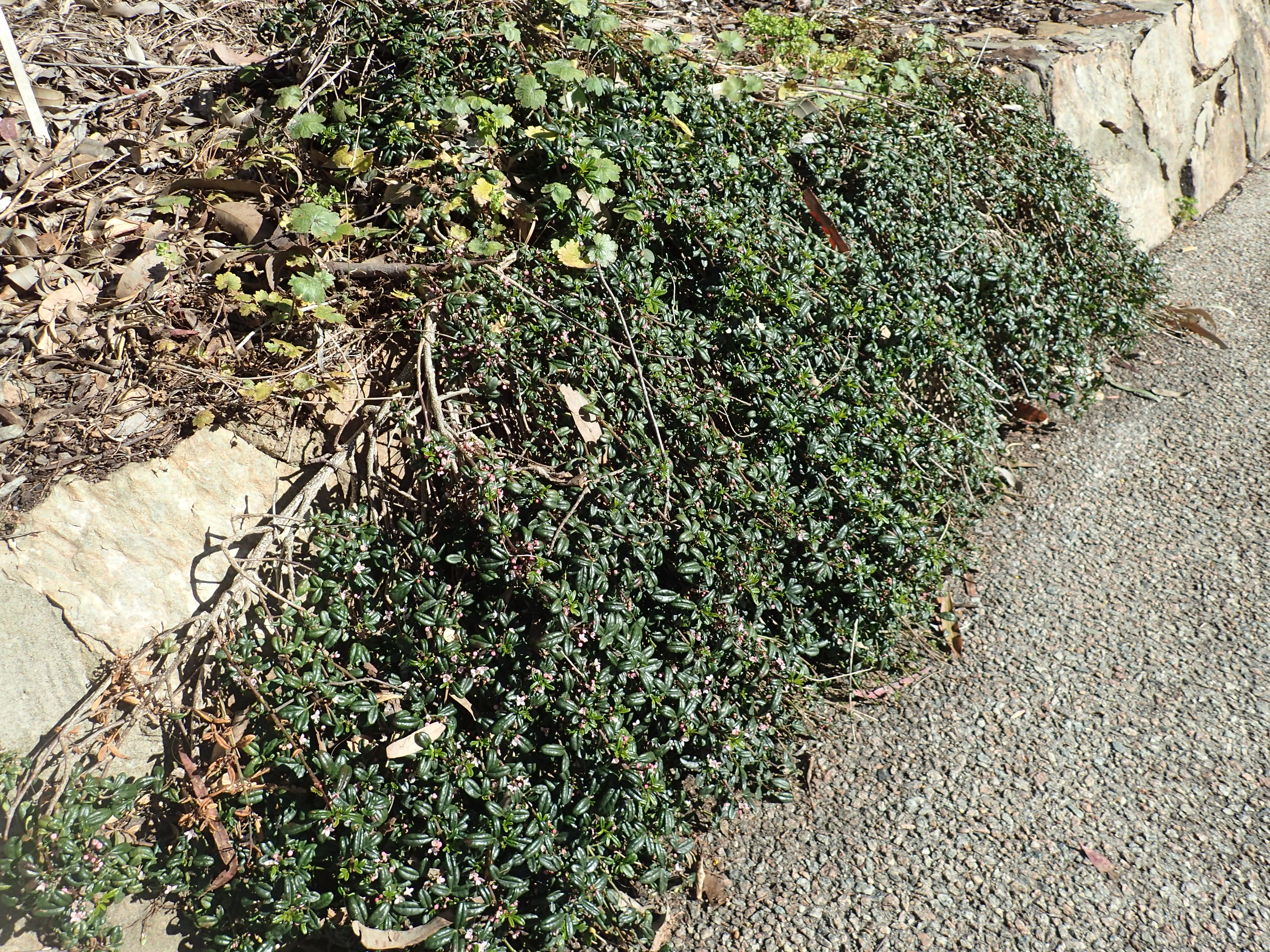
Habit

== Taxonomy and naming ==
Zieria prostrata was first formally described in 2002 by James Andrew Armstrong. However, the name had already been introduced in 1996 but without a valid description. The specific epithet (prostrata) is a Latin word meaning "down flat" or "laid low" and refers to its procumbent habit.

== Distribution and habitat ==
This zieria grows in low coastal heathland on headlands in a single nature reserve near Coffs Harbour. It is difficult to count the population size but the National Parks and Wildlife Service estimated about one thousand individuals in 1998. Other headlands along the New South Wales coastline have similar zierias and it is possible that other populations of this species may yet be discovered.

== Conservation ==
Zieria prostrata is classified as "Endangered" under the Commonwealth Government Environment Protection and Biodiversity Conservation Act 1999 (EPBC) Act. The main threat to its survival is invasion by introduced species, especially kikuyu (Pennisetum clandestinum), bitou bush (Chrysanthemoides monilifera) and lantana (Lantana camara).
