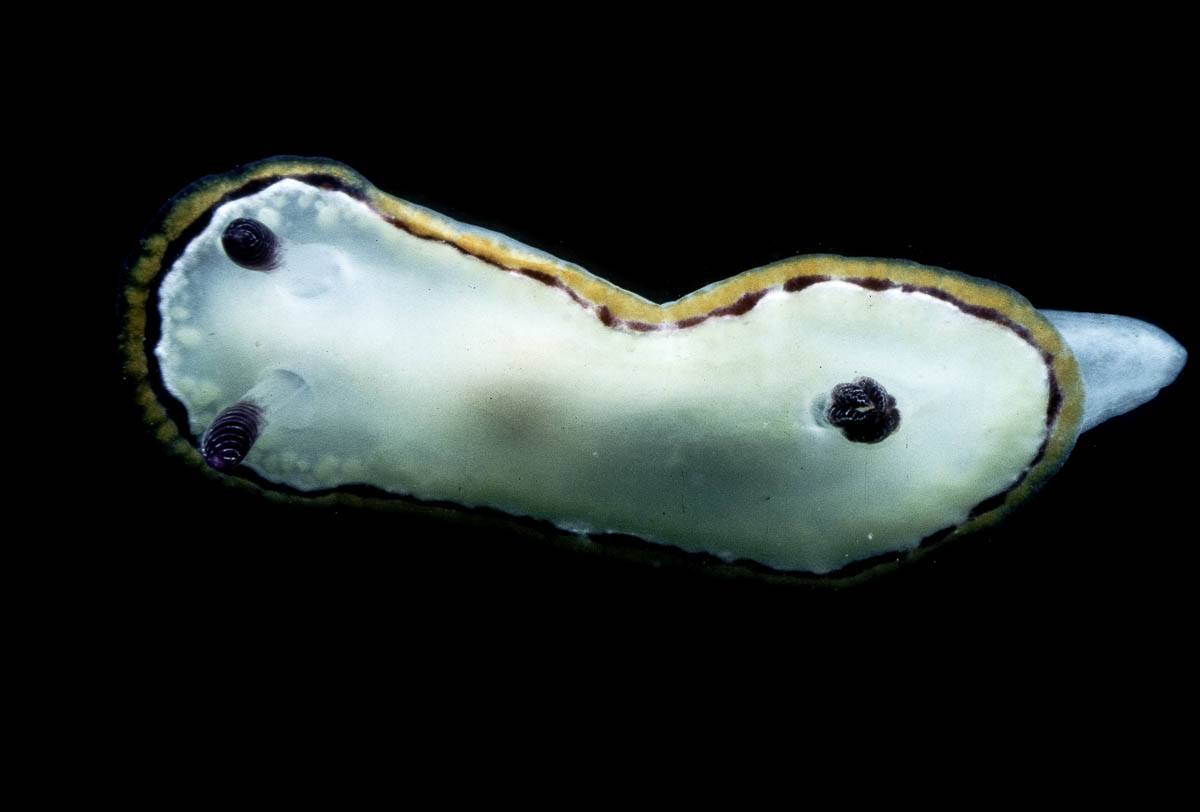
- The nudibranch Goniobranchus rubrocornutus, Mirs Bay, Hong Kong.

Scientific classification
- Kingdom: Animalia
- Phylum: Mollusca
- Class: Gastropoda
- Order: Nudibranchia
- Family: Chromodorididae
- Genus: Goniobranchus
- Species: G. rubrocornutus

Binomial name
- Goniobranchus rubrocornutus (Rudman, 1985)

Synonyms
- Chromodoris rubrocornuta Rudman, 1985 (basionym)

= Goniobranchus rubrocornutus =

Species of gastropod

Goniobranchus rubrocornutus is a species of colourful sea slug, a dorid nudibranch, a marine gastropod mollusc in the family Chromodorididae.

== Distribution ==
This marine species occurs in the Western Pacific. It was described from Hong Kong. It has been reported from American Samoa, the Marshall Islands and the Philippines.

== Description ==
Goniobranchus rubrocornutus is a chromodorid nudibranch with a semi-translucent white mantle and coloured margin. In this species there is an irregular white band, then a broken red marginal band and a broad yellow band at the edge of the mantle. The rhinophores and gills are translucent red. The body reaches a length of 15 mm.
