= Coleus graveolens =

Scientific classification
- Kingdom: Plantae
- Clade: Tracheophytes
- Clade: Angiosperms
- Clade: Eudicots
- Clade: Asterids
- Order: Lamiales
- Family: Lamiaceae
- Genus: Coleus
- Species: C. graveolens

Binomial name
- Coleus graveolens (R.Br.) A.J.Paton

Synonyms
- Plectranthus graveolens R.Br.; Plectranthus parviflorus var. graveolens (R.Br.) Briq.

Species of flowering plant

Coleus graveolens, synonym Plectranthus graveolens, commonly called the Fragrant Spur-Flower or bush basil, is a shrub in the family Lamiaceae. It is native to New South Wales and Queensland in Australia.

== Description ==
C. graveolens is a shrub that has partially woody stems and can grow up to 1 m high. The leaves and branches are covered in small hairs that secrete substances, smelling medicinal when crushed.

The petiole is typically 0.25 to 0.7 times the length of the leaf. The leaf itself is generally oval shaped and 15–110 mm long and 15–80 mm wide. The leaf edges are scalloped, with 10–19 pairs of teeth around the circumference. It can appear close to Coleus cremnus but can be distinguished by having more scalloping on the leaf edges.

Comparison of C. graveolens and C. cremnus leaves

C. graveolens

C. cremnus

The inflorescence can be 150–250 mm long. The plant flowers between August and May.

== Distribution ==
C. graveolens is found across eastern Australia, from Hunter Valley to the Rockhampton Region. It grows on cliff sides or rocky ledges.

== Usage ==
A shrub of Plectanthus graveolens in the Australian Botanic Garden Mount Annan

C. graveolens has been used for medical purposes. It has been found to contain ethanolic compounds. For instance, the Dharawal peoples use it for respiratory issues.
