= North West Solitary Island =

Island in New South Wales, Australia

Coordinates: 30°01′04″S 153°16′17″E

North West Solitary Island is an island found off the New South Wales coast and inside the continental shelf. It is located 30 km north-east of Coffs Harbour and about 18 km south of Wooli.

The island is part of the Solitary Islands Marine Park established 2 January 1998 and managed by the New South Wales Maritime Parks Authority.

Rocks on North West Solitary Island consist of repeating beds of sillicaceous argillite, mudstone and sandstone. The argillite probably formed from volcanic ash falls. The beds are 5 to 10 cm thick. The strike of the beds is between 0° and 20° with overturned beds dipping to the east. The mudstone shows cleavage at an angle steeper than the bedding planes by 20°. Tectonically it is part of the Coffs Harbour Block which in turn is part of the New England Orogen.
