= Macdonald seamount =

Seamount in Polynesia, southeast of the Austral Islands

- Location within Pacific Ocean
- Summit depth: 40 m (130 ft)
- Height: Varies

Location
- Location: South Pacific Ocean
- Coordinates: 28°58.7′S 140°15.5′W

Geology
- Type: Seamount
- Last eruption: 1987-89

History
- Discovery date: 1967

Macdonald seamount (named after Gordon A. Macdonald) is a seamount in Polynesia, southeast of the Austral Islands and in the neighbourhood of a system of seamounts that include the Ngatemato seamounts and the Taukina seamounts. It rises 4,200 metres (13,800 ft) from the seafloor to a depth of about 40 metres (130 ft) and has a flat top, but the height of its top appears to vary with volcanic activity. There are some subsidiary cones such as Macdocald seamount. The seamount was discovered in 1967 and has been periodically active with gas release and seismic activity since then. There is hydrothermal activity on Macdonald, and the vents are populated by hyperthermophilic bacteria.

Macdonald seamount is the currently active volcano of the Macdonald hotspot, a volcanic hotspot that has formed this seamount and some other volcanoes. Eruptions occurred in 1967, 1977, 1979–1983 and 1987–1989, and earthquakes were recorded in 2007. The activity, which has produced basaltic rocks, has modified the shape of the volcano and may lead to the formation of an island in the future.

== Discovery and name ==
Macdonald seamount was discovered in 1967, when hydrophones noted earthquake activity in the area. The seamount was named in 1970 after Gordon A. Macdonald. It is also known as Tamarii, while MacDonald appears to be an incorrect capitalization.

== Geography and geology ==
=== Regional setting ===
The Pacific Ocean is characterized by long island chains, which typically extend from the southeast to the northwest in direction of the motion of the Pacific Plate. Often, such chains begin in the southeast with volcanoes such as Hawaii that become progressively more eroded northwestward and eventually end as series of atolls. This has led to the suggestion that they are formed by deep sources over which the Pacific Plate drifts and eventually carries the volcano away from its magma source. These sources are known as "hotspots", and their total number has been estimated to be between 42 and 117. Hotspots may also be formed by cracks propagating in the crust, and such hotspots would not necessarily show an age progression. In the particular case of the current location of the Macdonald hotspot the activity is likely also tectonically to be related to the South Pacific superswell.

=== Local setting ===
Macdonald seamount is located off the southeastern end of the Austral Islands. The Austral Islands extend away from the southern Cook Islands to Îles Maria and eventually Marotiri southeastward, including the islands Rimatara, Rurutu, Tubuai, Raivavae and Rapa. A relatively large gap separates Marotiri from the Macdonald volcano. The Ngatemato seamounts and Taukina seamounts lie north of Macdonald, they are considerably older and appear to have a very different origin. Even farther southeast lies the Foundation seamount chain, and the associated hotspot may have generated some of the seamounts close to Macdonald.

The seamount lies close to the southeastern end of an area of shallower ocean, which extends northwestward towards Marotiri, and includes Annie seamount, Simone seamount and President Thiers Bank. The 3,000 metres (9,800 ft) high Ra seamount (named after Polynesian term for "sun") rises 100 kilometres (62 mi) northwest of Macdonald to a depth of 1,040 metres (3,410 ft); it is apparently an extinct volcano and may have once emerged above sea level. A smaller seamount, Macdocald, rises from the southern foot of Macdonald 850 metres (2,790 ft) to depths of 3,150 metres (10,330 ft). Additional small seamounts that appear to have formed at the East Pacific Rise are also found in the area. The crust beneath Macdonald is of Eocene age, and away from the area of shallower ocean it is covered with hills and sediment.

Macdonald seamount rises 4,200 metres (13,800 ft) from the seafloor to a depth of about 40 metres (130 ft) below sea level; surveys in 1979 found a pinnacle reaching to a depth of 49 metres (161 ft) below sea level and a 150 by 100 metres (490 ft × 330 ft) wide summit plateau with small (6 metres (20 ft) high and 3 metres (9.8 ft) wide) spatter cones. Other sources indicate a surface area of 2.4 square kilometres (0.93 sq mi) for the summit plateau. Ongoing volcanic activity may have modified the topography of the summit of Macdonald between surveys in 1975 and 1982, forming another elliptical pinnacle reaching a depth of 29 metres (95 ft) at the northwestern margin of the plateau and raising the summit plateau to depths of 50–34 metres (164–112 ft). By the time of a new survey in 1986, the pinnacle had been replaced by a pile of rocks which only reached a depth of 42 metres (138 ft).

The upper parts of the edifice are covered by 50 centimetres (20 in) thick lapilli with lava flows underneath. Some hydrothermal alteration products are also found, and a thick ash cover occurs to depths of 2,000 metres (6,600 ft). Aside from these lapilli deposits, scoriaceous lava flows are exposed on the edifice as well. Farther down, lava flow fronts form scarps which become particularly noticeable at depths of 620–1,000 metres (2,030–3,280 ft), except on the northern flank. Even deeper, pillow lavas predominate.

Below the summit area, the slopes fall down steeply to a depth of 600 metres (2,000 ft) and then flatten out. Save for a debris-covered ridge to the northwest, Macdonald has a circular shape, with a width of 45 kilometres (28 mi) at a depth of 3,900 metres (12,800 ft). The slopes of Macdonald display radial ridges which may reflect tectonically-controlled rift zones, as well as isolated parasitic cones. The volume of the whole edifice has been estimated to be 820 cubic kilometres (200 cu mi). Macdonald seamount bears traces of landslides, including collapse scars up on the edifice and smooth terrain formed by debris on its lower slopes; collapses have been inferred on the eastern, southern, western and northwestern flank. The seafloor further shows evidence of turbidity currents, including ripples.

Geomagnetic analysis of the edifice has demonstrated the existence of a normally magnetized structure at the base of the volcano and an additional anomaly which seems to be the magma chamber at a depth of 2 kilometres (1.2 mi) within the edifice, close to the northern flank. Data obtained in gabbroic rocks expelled by the volcano during its eruptions also suggest that another magma reservoir exists at depths of 5 kilometres (3.1 mi), that is within the crust beneath Macdonald.

=== Composition ===
Macdonald has principally erupted basalt. This basalt contains phenocrysts of clinopyroxene, olivine and especially plagioclase. Additional rocks are basanite, mugearite, picrite and tephrite. The overall composition is alkaline and nephelinic. Rock debris found on Macdonald seamount includes intrusive rocks such as gabbro, metadolerite, picrite and pyroxenite; the gabbros appear to originate from slow crystallization of basaltic magma within a magma reservoir, followed by low temperature alteration. Such rocks were uprooted by explosive activity. In addition, hydrothermal and thermal alteration has formed amphibole, chlorite, epidote, phyllosilicates, pyrite, quartz and smectite, with additional components including albite, biotite, labradorite, leucodiorite and orthopyroxene.

The vulcanites are typical ocean island basalts, whose alkaline nature is unlike the tholeiite that is found on other hotspot volcanoes such as Hawaii, Iceland and Reunion. In these volcanoes alkaline lavas are erupted in the post-shield stage but Macdonald is clearly a developing volcano, and further research is needed to explain the chemical history of Macdonald. These magmas in the case of Macdonald were derived from the partial melting of spinel-lherzolite and further influenced by fractional crystallization and carbon dioxide, but with no influence of the overlying plate.

== Eruptions ==
Macdonald is the only known active volcano in the Cook Islands and Austral Islands, unlike in the Society Islands where active volcanism is spread over several volcanoes. The first recorded eruptions at Macdonald occurred in 1967 and was followed by additional activity in 1977, although pumice rafts observed in 1928 and 1936 could have been formed by the seamount as well. These eruptions were recorded with hydrophones; further such activity occurred 1979–1983. Some eruptions, especially eruptions on the southern flank or within a crater, would have passed unnoticed. Additional eruptions at Macdonald occurred between June 1987 – December 1988, and a seismic swarm probably unassociated with eruptions occurred in 2007.

Eruptions at Macdonald include phreatic and phreatomagmatic activity which led to the formation of lapilli and lava bombs and also to the hydrophone signals, but also effusive eruptions forming lava flows. Volcanic activity is not steady, with prolonged pauses observed between eruptions. Macdonald seamount is among the most active submarine volcanoes in the world, and the most active on the floor of the Pacific Ocean.

Radiometric dating of rocks dredged from Macdonald has yielded two separate clusters of ages, one less than two million years old and the second about 30 million years.

=== 1989 events ===
Several eruptions occurred in 1989 when a scientific expedition was underway on the seamount. These eruptions were accompanied by the discolouration of the water over 1.6 kilometres (1 mile) of length, the release of burning hydrogen and hydrogen sulfide accompanied by the formation of a plume of hydrothermally altered water. The submarine Cyana observed activity directly in one summit crater in the form of intense bubbling, while steam and water fountains were seen on the ocean surface.

Grey-coloured slicks developed on the ocean surface, which were formed by pyrite, sulfur and volcanic glass plus smaller amounts of cinnabar, cubatine and quenstedtite. The events caused changes in the pH of the water on the seamount and increased methane concentrations.

=== Future birth of an island ===
Macdonald likely formed as an island during the Last Glacial Maximum when sea level was lower, and future eruptions at Macdonald may lead to the birth of an island even with present-day sea levels. Such an eruption would have to be fairly large and continuous, otherwise the resulting island will likely be eroded away quickly. Depending on how quickly erosion and other factors reduce its size, such an island will likely be temporary.

=== Hydrothermal system ===
Macdonald seamount is hydrothermally active, with several hydrothermal vents inferred to exist on the western flank. A 2–3 metres (6 ft 7 in – 9 ft 10 in) wide eruption fissure was observed to be hydrothermally active in 1989. Further, the volcano releases gases including carbon dioxide, methane and sulfur dioxide. Such release occurs in the summit area in the so-called "Champagne Field", but also from a second crater at 2,000 metres (6,600 ft) depth in the southeastern flank. Macdonald volcano may be a major source of heavy metals for the area. The methane appears to be partially of biological origin and partly abiogenic.

== Biology ==
Hyperthermophilic bacteria have been found on Macdonald, including Archaeoglobus, Pyrococcus, Pyrodictium and Thermococcus as well as previously undescribed species. These bacterial communities contain both hydrogen- or sulfur- consuming autotrophs and heterotrophs and appear to be capable of long-range propagation, considering that relatives of the species found are known from Vulcano in Italy.

Aside from hyperthermophiles, craniids, corals, polynoids and sponges have been found in the summit area of Macdonald.
