= Foundation Seamounts =

Series of seamounts in the southern Pacific Ocean

- Location within Pacific Ocean

Location
- Location: South Pacific Ocean

Geology
- Age of rock: Miocene–Pleistocene

History
- Discovery date: 1992

The Foundation Seamounts are a series of seamounts in the southern Pacific Ocean. Discovered in 1992, these seamounts form a 1,350-kilometre-long (840 mi) chain which starts from the Pacific-Antarctic Ridge. Some of these seamounts may have once emerged from the ocean.

They were probably formed by a now-weakening mantle plume called the Foundation hotspot that is located close to the Pacific-Antarctic Ridge. It is possible that this hotspot generated additional volcanoes, such as the Ngatemato and Taukina seamounts farther west. The oldest volcanism of the Foundation Seamounts occurred 21 million years ago, while the youngest volcanism appears to be hydrothermal venting and the eruption of a lava flow between 1997 and 2001 where the Foundation Seamounts intersect the Pacific-Antarctic Ridge.

== Name and discovery ==
The Foundation Seamounts were discovered in 1992 through satellite altimetry observations. They are named after the National Science Foundation, a name-giving inspired by the naming of the Society Islands after the British Royal Society. Both toponyms were given in honour of the role that both groups played in science, mapping and navigation.

== Geography ==
Foundation seamounts with selected naming for clarity. Click on the rectangle to access descriptions which gives more detail. The East Pacific Rise and Pacific-Antarctic Ridge plate boundaries are shown as a white line.
Legend for igneous rock types from samples
- Key:
- Basaltic andesite
- Trachyandesite
- Alkalic basalt
- Quartz tholeiite
- Olivine tholeiite
- Unknown

The Foundation Seamounts are located in a part of the Pacific Plate where major tectonic events have occurred. The breakup of the Farallon Plate was accompanied by a reorganization of plate movements 26–11 million years ago, causing a change in the trend of local fracture zones. A microplate formed at that time and was eventually attached to the Pacific plate when the spreading zone between the Pacific Plate and the microplate became inactive. Part of the Foundation Seamounts lie on this ex-microplate, which is called the Selkirk microplate. The passage of this microplate above the hotspot has altered its volcano-building activity, which generated more discrete seamounts while beneath the thicker microplate, and conversely the interaction between the Foundation system and plate boundaries may be responsible for the formation of the Selkirk microplate.

The Foundation Seamounts form a 1,350-kilometre-long (840 mi) and 180-kilometre-wide (110 mi) band of seamounts within the coordinates 34°9′15.1″S 124°0′0″W to 36°0′0″S 132°0′0″W, that extend northwestward away from the Pacific-Antarctic Ridge towards the Resolution (32°30′S 132°30′W) and Del Cano (34°30′S 130°00′W) fracture zones. A small ridge continues from there to the Macdonald seamount, but the relation of this ridge to the Foundation Seamounts appears to be questionable at best, and there are no other clear bathymetric features in between Foundation and Macdonald. Close to the western end of the Foundation Seamounts lie the "Old Pacific Seamounts", which may have the same origin. On the other end of the chain, the seamounts become short ridges decorated by volcanic cones; the Pacific-Antarctic Ridge is migrating northwestward and approaching the hotspot, and the younger crust close to the ridge results in the morphology of developing volcanoes being altered. The Foundation chain eventually becomes a set of three ridges close to the Pacific-Antarctic Ridge, the northern two of which are the more voluminous ones. These northern ridges are probably the main ones; the southern one may have formed through cracks in the crust induced by the northern ridge, but it might also be a "paired" expression of a hotspot similar to the Kea and Loa trends in Hawaii.

The seamounts reach depths of 2,000–180 metres (6,560–590 ft) beneath sea level (the highest seamount is located at 35.90°S 116.04°W), and contain typical volcanic features such as smaller volcanic cones, calderas, and individual rift zones. Some of the seamounts close to the ridge have flat tops and show evidence of having formed islands above sea level in the past. On the other end of the ridge, Buffon Seamount rises to a depth of 470 metres (1,540 ft) and likewise shows evidence of having emerged above sea level, as well as of extensive erosion. The seamounts were originally named after letters of the alphabet A-Z followed by Aa-Hh; later 41 of them were numbered through from west to east and names based on scientists such as Ampere proposed.. Only a few of these names have been accepted to prevent dublication, with accepted GEBCO names being only Gerasimov Seamount (Newton Seamount, Foundation Seamount 31), Komarov Seamount (Mercator Seamount, Foundation Seamount 30), Druzhinin Seamount (Linné B Seamount, (Foundation Seamount 27b) and Baranov Seamount.

The seamount named Hh in 1992 rises to a depth of 579 metres (1,900 ft); however, its closeness to a minor ridge might indicate that it is not part of the Foundation Seamounts. The seamounts on the far western end of the Foundation chain have morphologies that differ from those of the main chain and were probably created by a different process.

The Foundation Seamounts appear to be continuous with the Macdonald seamount, Austral Islands, and Cook Islands; the Ngatemato seamounts and Taukina seamounts could be a connection between the Foundation chain and these chains, an impression bolstered by their dates and their strike direction. The absence of seamounts between the Ngatemato and Foundation chains might reflect discontinuous volcanism. The President Thiers Bank close to Raivavae may also be linked to the Foundation hotspot, and the 135-million-years-old Magellan Rise may be an oceanic plateau formed by the Foundation hotspot and thus its oldest volcano. Between 50 and 25 million years ago the hotspot might have been located below the Farallon Plate. There, it could have given rise to the Iquique Ridge, a submarine ridge now found on the Nazca Plate off northern Chile.

== Geology ==
Foundation Seamounts Bathymetry
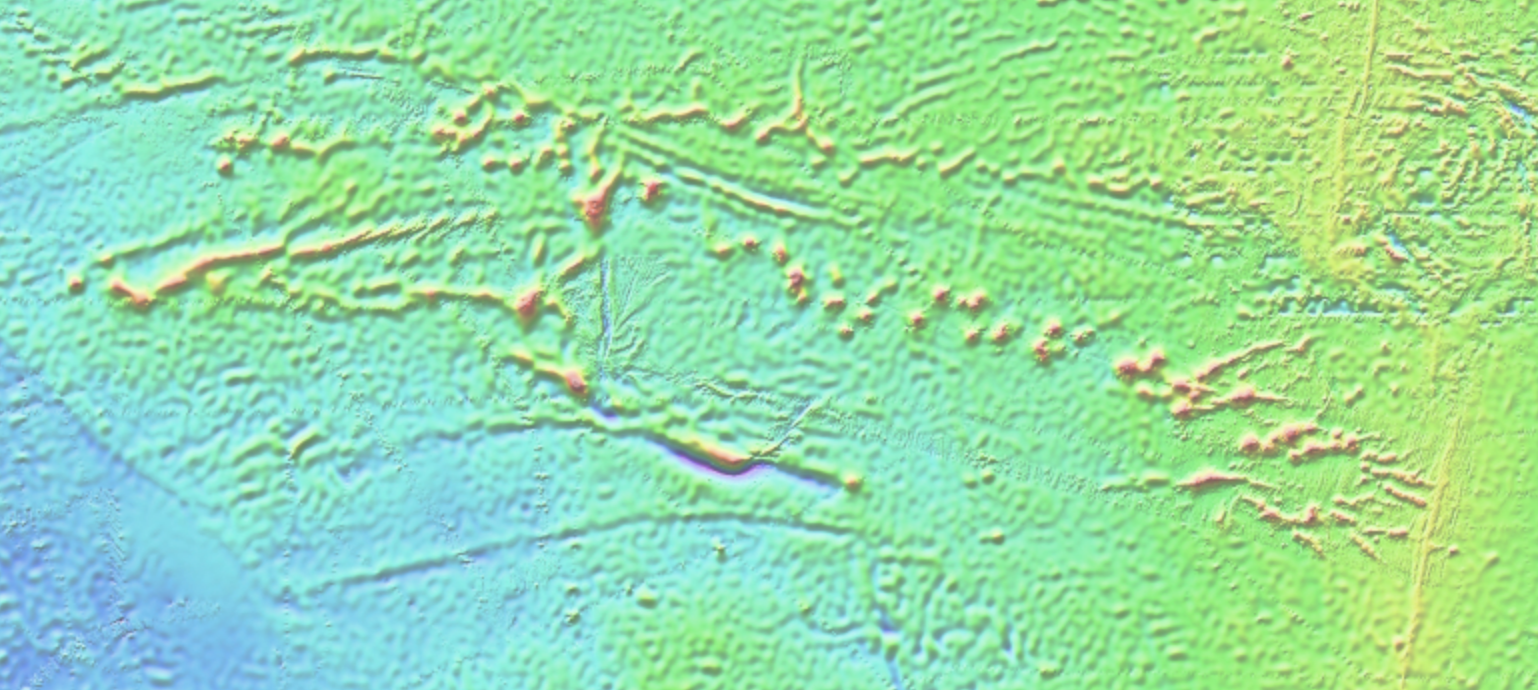
Features labelled black are of the Foundation Seamounts (NR is North Ridge, SR is South Ridge) and those labelled white are nearby. Ages for possible locations in time of the Foundation hotspot are shown in red. For more detail on dredged rock samples age see descriptions in the interactive map on this page.

The Pacific-Antarctic Ridge is unusually shallow (1,500–1,700 metres (4,900–5,600 ft) depth instead of 2,300–2,600 metres (7,500–8,500 ft)) at the point where the Foundation seamounts intersect the ridge; this thickening of the ridge also alters the chemistry of erupted magmas there, leading to the occurrence of andesite and dacite which are formed within the thickened crust. This area of silicic volcanism extends southward from the point where the Pacific-Antarctic Ridge intersects the Foundation Seamounts. There is no indication of volcanism on the other side of the ridge.

The Foundation Seamounts appear to originate from a hotspot, with the neon and helium isotope ratios suggesting that the hotspot is a mantle plume, which is interacting with the spreading ridge. The Foundation hotspot is considerably weaker than many other hotspots such as the Society hotspot or the Hawaii hotspot, and its volcanoes were constructed in shorter timespans than the Hawaiian ones. Because an age progression was not found at first (Macdonald seamount is active in its own right), a "hot line" origin was proposed at first; argon-argon dating performed later on rocks dredged from the seamounts has clearly demonstrated age progressive volcanism.

The plume may be located either directly underneath the spreading ridge, or about 360–400 kilometres (220–250 mi) west of it; geoid anomalies are centered on the volcanic ridges and indicate a distance of 36 kilometres (22 mi) but with some large uncertainty. It is possible that the Pacific-Antarctic Ridge is "sucking" away hotspot mantle flow towards the ridge, influencing its magma output, the interaction eventually resulting in the formation of the volcanic ridges that occur between the eastern Foundation Seamounts and the Pacific-Antarctic Ridge. These ridges started to form by 7.7 ± 0.1 million years ago and continued until 0.5 ± 0.1 million years ago, which is the youngest date obtained on these ridges.

=== Composition ===
The Foundation Seamounts are constructed by various types of alkalic magmas, including alkali basalt, trachyandesite, and trachydacite. Dredge samples have found rocks consisting of aphyric basalt with plagioclase phenocrysts and olivine. Manganese crusts and palagonite are also found.

=== Eruption history ===
Volcanic activity of the Foundation hotspot appears to have been steady throughout 23–5 million years ago, but may have weakened dramatically since then. Radiometric dating performed on the Foundation Seamounts shows that their age decreases from 21 million years on their western end to present on their eastern end. On average, age progression along the chain is about 91 ± 2 millimetres per year (3.583 ± 0.079 in/year), comparable to that of the Hawaii hotspot.

Close to the intersection between the Foundation chain and the Pacific-Antarctic Ridge, a lava flow field was emplaced between 1997 and 2001 on a bathymetric high. Hydrothermal communities and thermal anomalies have been observed in the same area, suggesting ongoing hydrothermal venting there. This volcanic activity is almost certainly forced by the interaction between the Pacific-Antarctic Ridge and the Foundation hotspot. The main Foundation Seamounts appear to be aseismic; if earthquake activity occurs at the intersection of the Foundation chain with the Antarctic Pacific Ridge, then it is drowned out by the general ridge seismicity.

== Biology ==
Among the animals found on the Foundation Seamounts are the seaperch Helicolenus lengerichi, the striped trumpeter, decapods including the genus Paralomis and the species Shinkaia crosnieri, and the spiny lobster Jasus caveorum. The Foundation Seamounts are a candidate for an Ecologically or Biologically Significant Area.

The intersection of the Foundation and Pacific-Antarctic Ridges is the first-known deep-sea hydrothermal system in the Southern Hemisphere. Hydrothermal communities found at the active hydrothermal venting sites include Bathymodiolus, bythograeids, Munidopsis, Neolepas, polychaetes, snails, and zoarcid fish. Filter feeders are found as well and include crinoids and hexactinellid sponges. Actinians, coryphaenid fish, and serpulids round out the local fauna.
