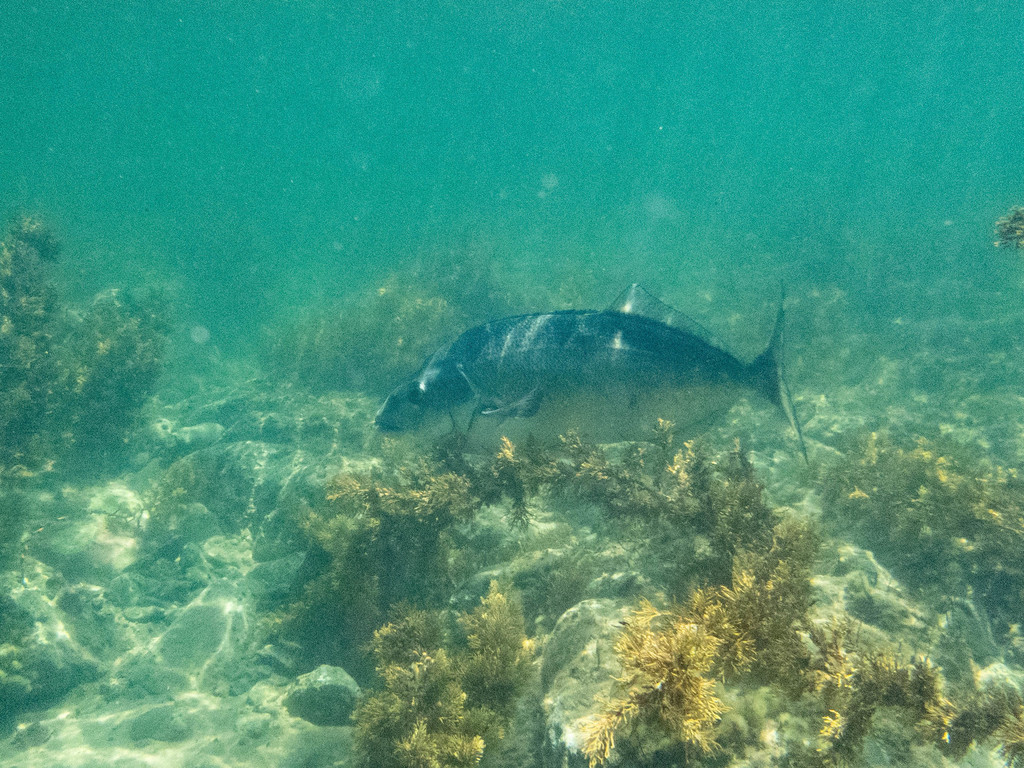
- Blue moki (Latridopsis ciliaris)

Scientific classification
- Kingdom: Animalia
- Phylum: Chordata
- Class: Actinopterygii
- Division: Teleostei
- Order: Centrarchiformes
- Family: Latridae
- Genus: Latridopsis; T. N. Gill, 1862

Type species
- Anthias ciliaris J. R. Forster, 1801

Synonyms
- Evistius T. N. Gill, 1893; Melbanella Whitley, 1937; Micropus Kner, 1868; Orqueta Jordan, 1919

= Latridopsis =

Genus of fishes

Latridopsis is a genus of marine ray finned fish belonging to the family Latridae, the trumpeters. They are found in the southwestern Pacific Ocean and the southeastern Indian Ocean.

== Taxonomy ==
Latridopsis was described in 1862 by the American ichthyologist Theodore Nicholas Gill who designated J.R. Forster's Anthias ciliaris as its type species, the genus was also monotypic when Gill described it. The name of the genus Latridopsis means "resembling Latris.

== Species ==
There are currently two recognized species in this genus:

- Latridopsis ciliaris (J. R. Forster, 1801) (Blue moki)
- Latridopsis forsteri (Castelnau, 1872) (Bastard trumpeter)

== Characteristics ==
Latridopsis is distinguished from Latris and Mendosoma using the following combined characters. They have a somewhat oval and compressed body with a pointed snout and a terminal mouth, which does not have thick, fleshy lips with a slim caudal peduncle. The dorsal fin contains 16-18 relatively uniform sized spines and 37-43 soft rays while the long anal fin contains 3 spines and 31-37 soft rays, a deep incision separates the spiny and soft rayed part of the dorsal fin. The pectoral fins have 16-19 rays, the upper rays are longer than the lower rays with none being very elongated and the tips of the fins are rounded. Their overall colour is grey. They are relatively large fish with maximum total lengths being 65 cm (26 in) for L. forsteri and 80 cm (31 in) for L. ciliaris.

== Distribution and habitat ==
Latridopsis trumpeters are found in the south eastern Indian Ocean and the southwestern Pacific Ocean in southern Australia, including Tasmania, and New Zealand. They are found up to 160 m (520 ft) in depth on rocky reefs.

== Biology ==
Latridopsis species prey on diverse taxa of benthic invertebrates. They are normally solitary, or in small aggregations but will form large schools for migration.

== Fisheries ==
Latridopsis species are targeted by commercial fisheries in some parts of their range.
