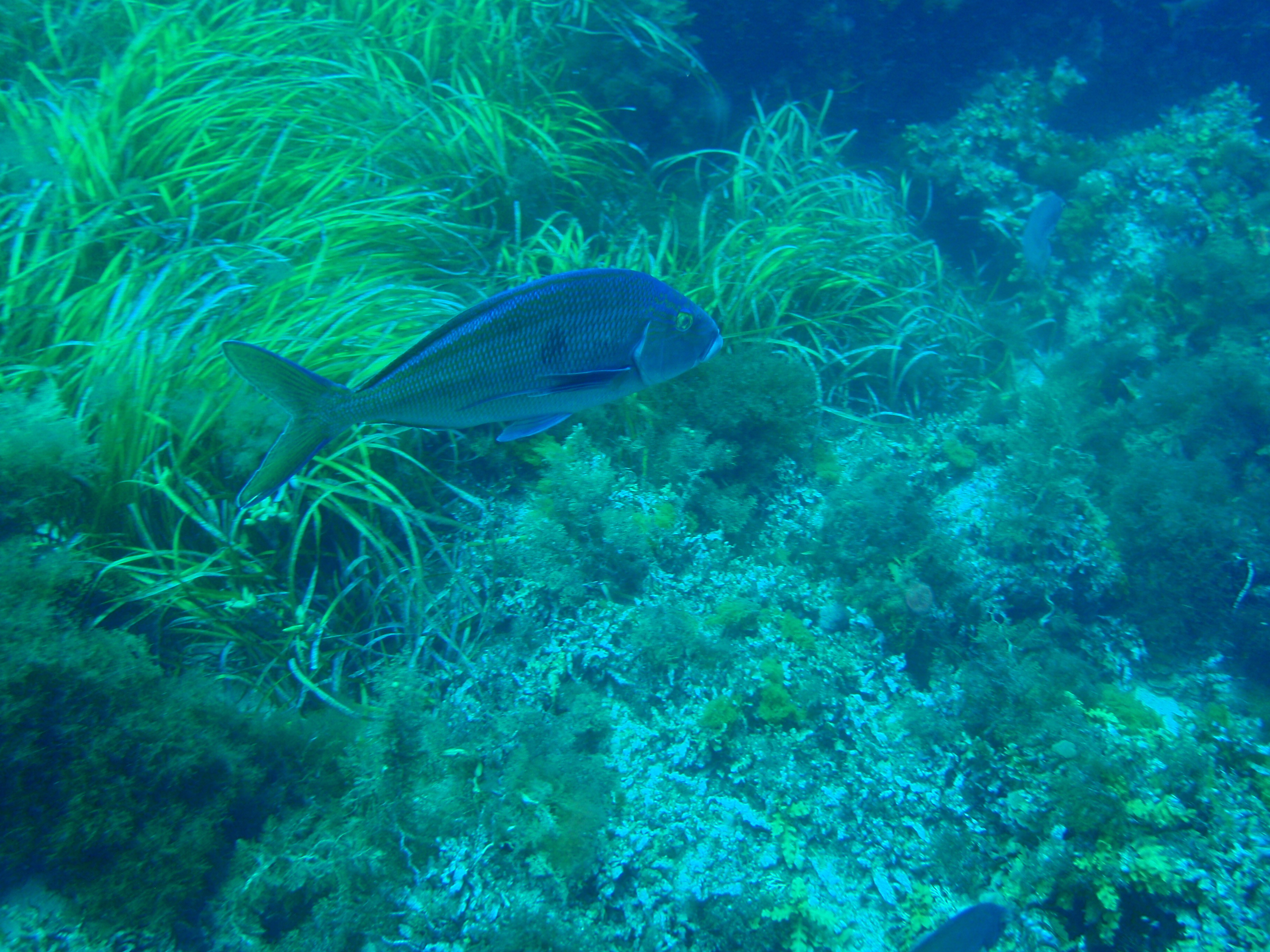

Scientific classification
- Kingdom: Animalia
- Phylum: Chordata
- Class: Actinopterygii
- Order: Centrarchiformes
- Family: Latridae
- Genus: Nemadactylus
- Species: N. valenciennesi

Binomial name
- Nemadactylus valenciennesi Whitley, 1937

Synonyms
- Sciaenoides valenciennesi Whitley, 1937

= Nemadactylus valenciennesi =

Species of fish

Nemadactylus valenciennesi (common names include blue morwong, queen snapper, the queen fish, sea carp or southern blue morwong), is a species of marine ray-finned fish, traditionally regarded as belonging to the family Cheilodactylidae, the members of which are commonly known as morwongs. It is endemic to southern Australia.

== Taxonomy ==
Nemadactylus valenciennesi was first formally described in 1937 as Sciaenoides valenciennesi by the Australian ichthyologist Gilbert Percy Whitley with the type locality given as King George Sound in Western Australia. The specific name honours Achille Valenciennes, who originally described this species as Cheilodactylus carponemus in 1830, but that name is a synonym of N. macropterus. Genetic and morphological analyses strongly support the placement of Nemadactylus in the family Latridae, alongside almost all of the other species formerly classified in the Cheilodactylidae.

== Description ==
Nemadactylus valenciennesi is a large species of morwong which attains a maximum total length of 90 cm (35 in). The overall colour is silvery blue with yellow tints on the flanks. There is a pattern of bright blue and yellow lines around the eyes. It has thick, fleshy lips and there is a very elongated pectoral fin ray. The juveniles are marked with a number of yellow horizontal lines on the body with a black blotch on the flank, these markings fade and in larger individuals they are vague. The maximum recorded weight for this species is 11.36 kg (25.0 lb).

== Distribution and habitat ==
Nemadactylus valenciennesi Is endemic to the waters of southern Australia from Lancelin, Western Australia to Wooli, New South Wales, including northern Tasmania. It is found on offshore rocky reefs at depths between 40 and 240 m (130 and 790 ft).

== Biology ==
Nemadactylus valenciennesi has a relatively poorly understood biology. It is thought that they breed in inshore waters and move into deeper waters following breeding. It is a shorter lived species than other morwongs, which are smaller than this species, living for up to 21 years. However, it attains sexual maturity at the same young age of 3 to 7 years as its smaller congeners.

== Fisheries ==
Nemadactylus valenciennesi is the main species by weight landed by demersal gill net and longline fisheries in southern Western Australia where it is also one of the species most often kept by recreational anglers.
