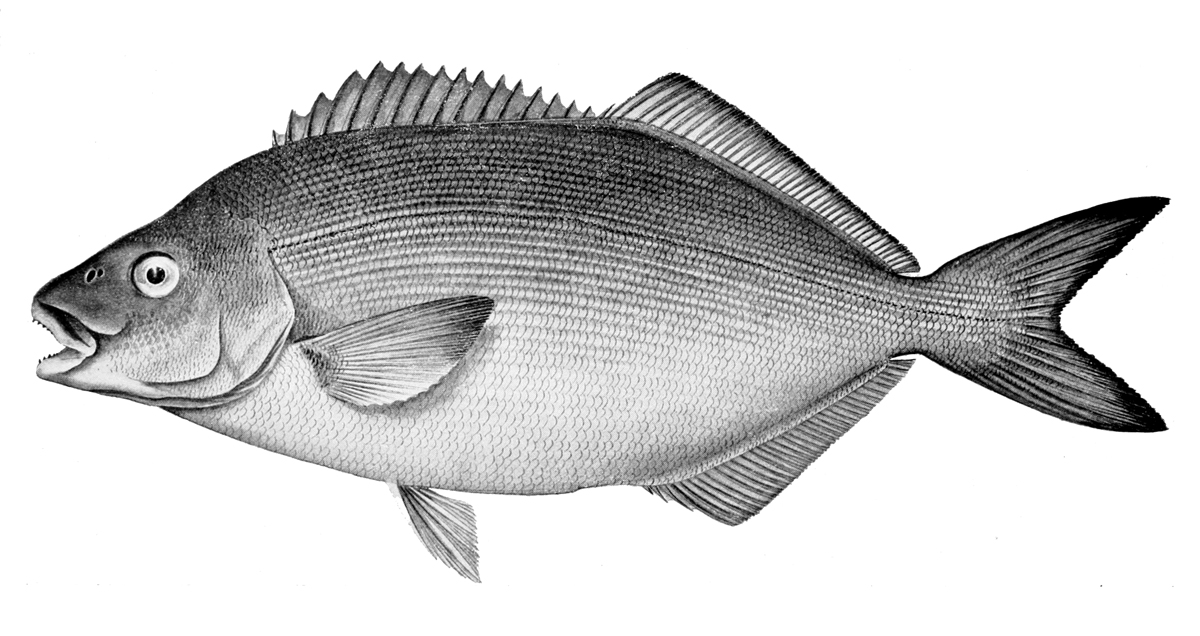

Scientific classification
- Kingdom: Animalia
- Phylum: Chordata
- Class: Actinopterygii
- Division: Teleostei
- Order: Centrarchiformes
- Family: Latridae
- Genus: Latridopsis
- Species: L. forsteri

Binomial name
- Latridopsis forsteri (Castelnau, 1872)

Synonyms
- Latris forsteri Castelnau, 1872; Platystethus huttonii Günther, 1876

= Latridopsis forsteri =

Bastard trumpeter

Species of fish

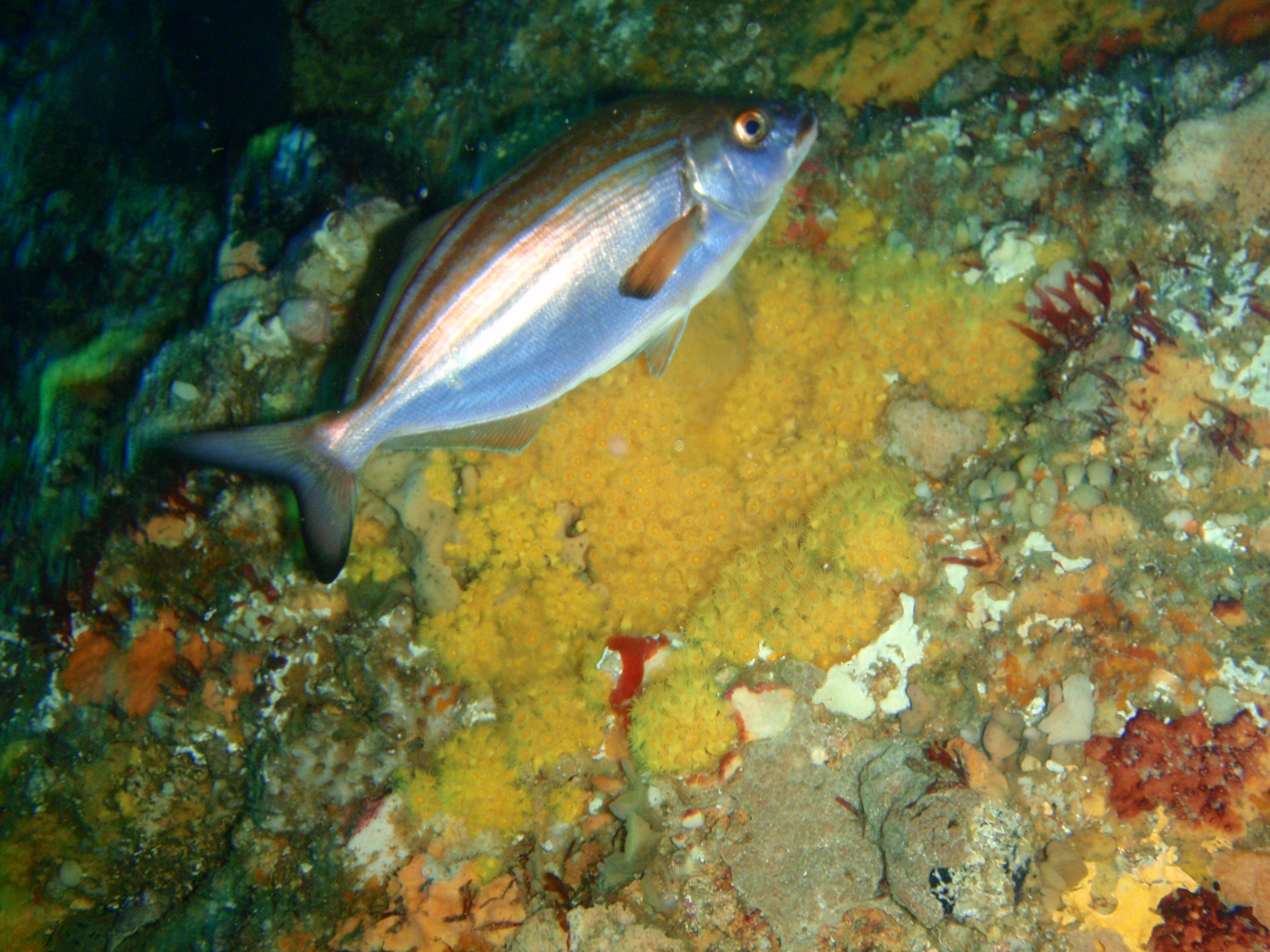
Bastard trumpeter Latridopsis forsteri at Ile des Phoques, Tasmania

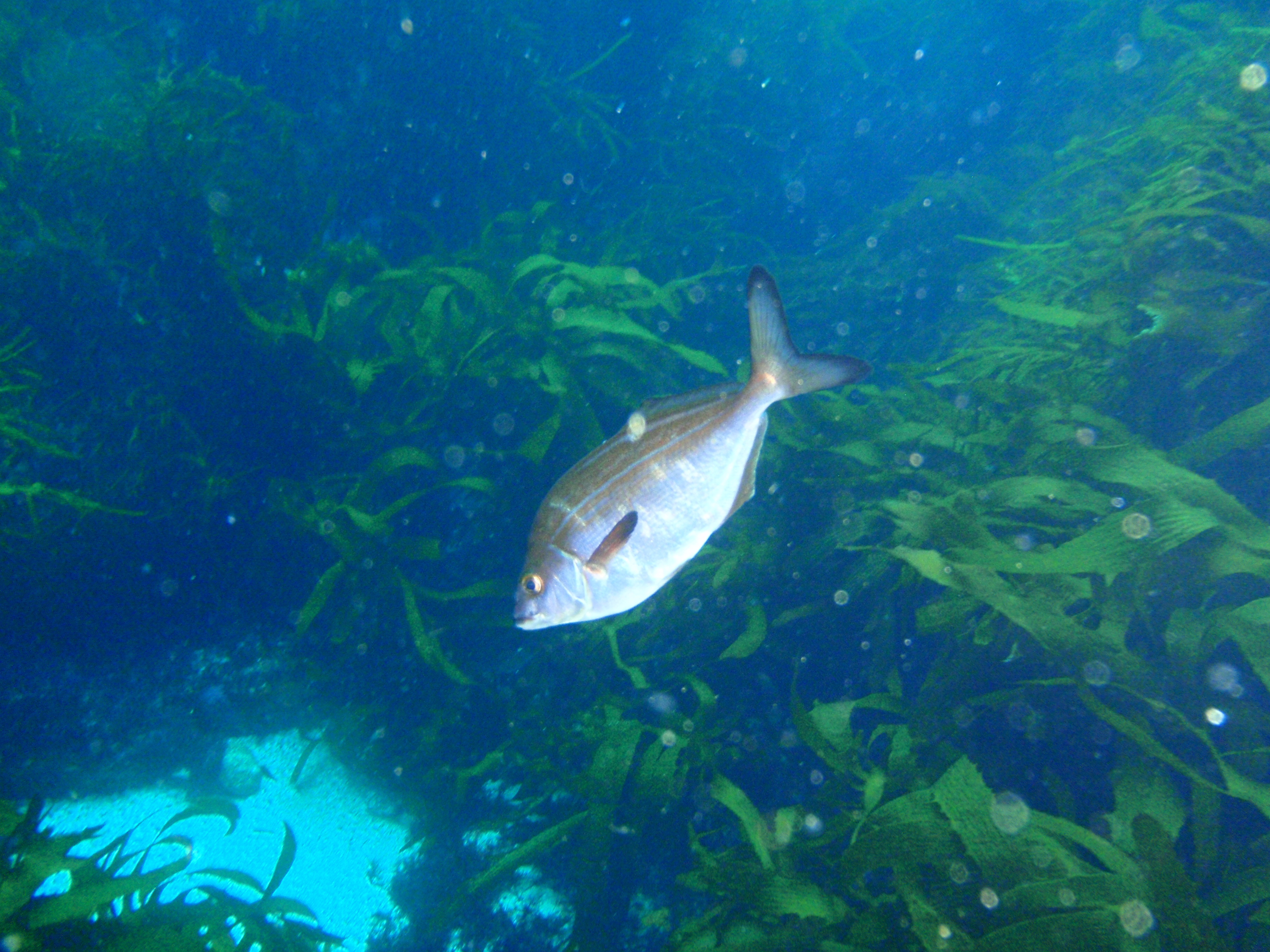
Latridopsis forsteri at Ile des Phoques

Latridopsis forsteri, the bastard trumpeter, copper moki, red bastard trumpeter, red, white and silver bastard trumpeter, silver bastard trumpeter, silver trumpeter or white bastard trumpeter, is a species of marine ray finned fish belonging to the family Latridae, the trumpeters. It is native to the eastern Indian Ocean and southwestern Pacific Ocean. This species is commercially important.

== Taxonomy ==
Latridopsis forsteri was first formally described in 1872 as Latris forsteri by the French naturalist Francis de Laporte de Castelnau with the type locality given as the Gipps Land coast in Victoria. The specific name honours the German naturalist Johann Reinhold Forster who was the naturalist aboard Captain Cook’s second voyage on HMS Resolution. Forster's manuscript description of Latridopsis ciliaris was published by Bloch & Schneider in their 1801 work Systema Ichthyologiae.

== Description ==
Latridopsis forsteri has a rather elongated, compressed and moderately deep body with a shallow caudal peduncle. The dorsal and anal fins are low, the continuous dorsal fin has a deep incision between the spiny and the soft rayed parts. The dorsal fin has 17 spines and 37-42 soft rays while the anal fin has 3 spines and 31-37 soft rays. The blunt pectoral fin has 16-19 rays with the upper rays being longer than the lower. The caudal fin is markedly forked. This species attains a maximum total length of 65 cm (26 in). The overall colour of this species is silver-grey marked with short, irregular brown or greenish-brown longitudinal lines on the upper flanks. The adults have a dark margin to the caudal fin. The pectoral fin also has a black margin and the eye is yellowish-white.

== Distribution and habitat ==
Latridopsis forsteri is native to the eastern Indian Ocean and southwestern Pacific Ocean around Australia from Victor Harbor, South Australia, to Port Stephens, New South Wales, and around Tasmania. In New Zealand it is found from Stewart Island in the south north to the Three Kings Islands and east to the Chatham Islands. This species inhabits coastal waters down as deep as approximately 60 m (200 ft). It is typically found swimming above sandy bottoms in the vicinity of rocky reefs. The larger adults normally aggregate in small schools over deeper, less sheltered reefs. The juveniles are small thin and transparent, this stage is termed 'paper fish', are found in schools over rocky reefs in shallower waters.

== Biology ==
Latridopsis forsteri is a predatory species which feeds on a variety of benthic invertebrates such as gastropods, bivalves, crustaceans, polychaetes and brittle stars.

== Fisheries ==
Latridopsis forsteri is a desirable target species for both commercial and recreational fisheries. It is caught using gill nets on commercial fisheries and is sometimes taken using rod and line. The flesh is highly regarded as food fish.

== In culture ==
Latrodopsis forsteri is known as the “bastard trumpeter” in Australia, about which the Australian ichthyologist Gilbert Percy Whitley said "These endearing terms are given to distinguish them from the so-called Real Trumpeter (Latris lineata), another fine fish, which grows to 4 ft. and 60 lb., also to suggest that the two may hybridize and also because fishermen think the immature ones are sterile.”
