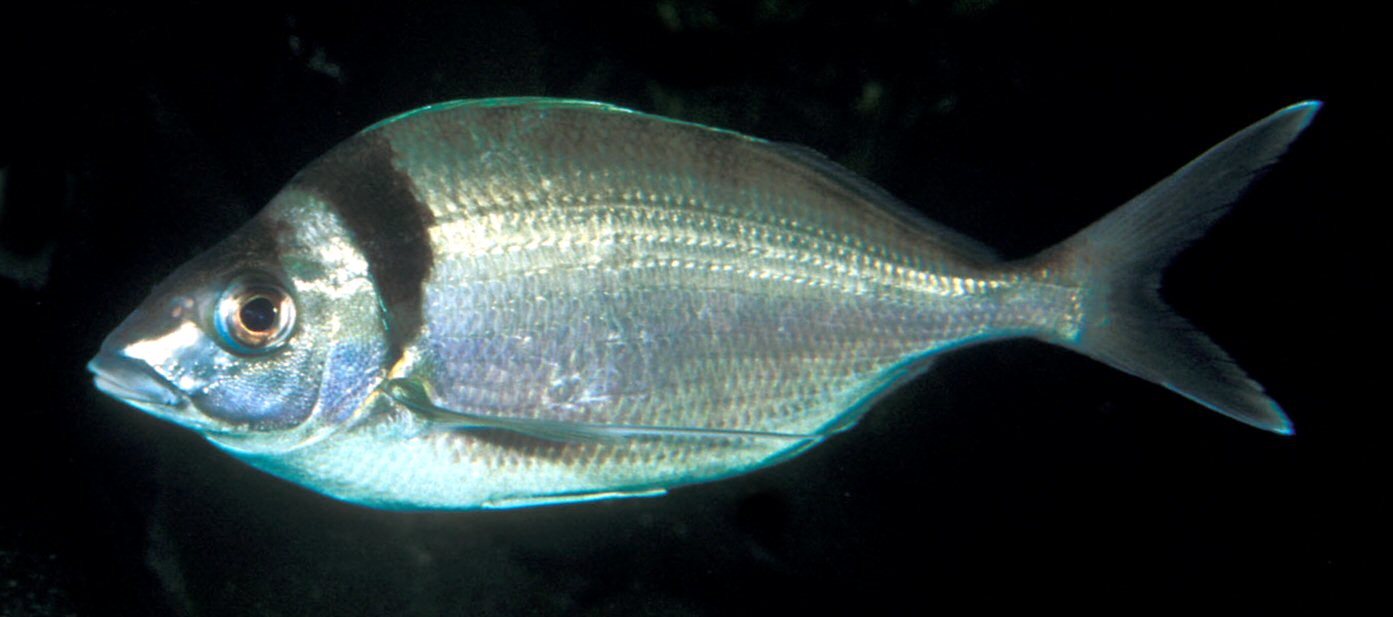
- Tarakihi (Nemadactylus macropterus)

Scientific classification
- Kingdom: Animalia
- Phylum: Chordata
- Class: Actinopterygii
- Order: Centrarchiformes
- Family: Latridae
- Genus: Nemadactylus; J. Richardson, 1839

Type species
- Nemadactylus concinnus Richardson, 1839

Synonyms
- Acantholatris Gill, 1862; Dactylopagrus Gill, 1862; Dactylosparus Gill, 1862

= Nemadactylus =

Genus of fishes

Nemadactylus is a genus of marine ray-finned fish, traditionally regarded as belonging to the family Cheilodactylidae, the members of which are commonly known as morwongs. They are found in the South Atlantic, Indian and South Pacific Oceans.

== Systematics ==
Nemadactylus was first formally described as a genus in 1839 by the Scottish naval surgeon, arctic explorer and naturalist Sir John Richardson when he described Nemadactylus concinnus which he designated the type species of the new genus by monotypy. Nemadactylus concinnus is now considered to be a synonym of Johann Reinhold Forster's Chichla macroptera. The specific name is a compound of nema meaning "thread" and dactylus which means "finger", a reference to the long rays of the pectoral fins of the type species.

The genus has traditionally been assigned to Cheilodactylidae, but a number of papers published in the late 1990s and early 2000s placed Nemadactylus as sister to Latris, suggesting its reassignment to the Latridae. Further genetic and morphological analyses strongly support the placement of Nemadactylus in the family Latridae, alongside almost all of the other species formerly classified in the Cheilodactylidae. Only two Southern African species, Cheilodactylus fasciatus and C. pixi would remain in the revised Cheilodactylidae. The 5th edition of Fishes of the World, however, retains Nemadactylus within the family Cheiloactylidae.

== Species ==
There are currently seven recognized species in this genus:

- Nemadactylus bergi (Norman, 1937) (Castaneta)
- Nemadactylus douglasii (Hector, 1875) (Porae)
- Nemadactylus gayi (Kner, 1865)
- Nemadactylus macropterus (J. R. Forster, 1801) (Tarakihi)
- Nemadactylus monodactylus (Carmichael, 1819) (St. Paul's fingerfin)
- Nemadactylus valenciennesi (Whitley, 1937) (Sea carp)
- Nemadactylus vemae (M. J. Penrith, 1967)

An eighth undescribed species, informally named the "king tarakihi", is known from the Tasman Sea off New South Wales and New Zealand as well as at Lord Howe Island, Norfolk Island and the Kermadec Islands, this has been given the placeholder name Nemadactylus sp, as it has not been formally described so no binomial has been applied. This undescribed species differs in morphology from N. macropterus. Studies in New Zealand have confirmed that the "king tarahiki" is genetically separate from N. macropterus and a phylogenetic study found that the undescribed N. sp is a sister taxon to the eastern Pacific N. gayi.

== Characteristics ==
Nemadactylus morwongs are separated from related taxa by having an ova; compressed body with a shallow dorsal profile to the head. There is a continuous dorsal fin with no incision separating the spiny part from the soft rayed part. The dorsal fin has 16-18 spines and 24-31 soft rays, the spines are not elongated. The anal fin has 3 spines and 11-19 soft rays while the pectoral fin has 16-16 rays, one of which is highly elongated, reaching beyond the origin of the anal fin. They vary in total length from 39.5 cm (15.6 in) in N. bergi to 90 cm (35 in) in N. valenciennesi.

== Distribution, habitat and biology ==
Nemadactylus morwongs are found in the temperate regions of the southern hemisphere off southern Africa, the southern Indian Ocean, Australia, New Zealand and southern South America. They are predators of benthic invertebrates.

== Fisheries ==
Nemadactylus morwongs, particularly the larger species, are of some interest to fisheries. For example the tarakihi (N. macropterus) is sought after by both commercial and recreation fisheries in New Zealand.
