= Silver trumpeter =

Scientific classification
- Kingdom: Animalia
- Phylum: Chordata
- Class: Actinopterygii
- Order: Centrarchiformes
- Family: Latridae
- Genus: Latris
- Species: L. pacifica

Binomial name
- Latris pacifica C.D. Roberts, 2003

Species of fish

The silver trumpter (Latris pacifica) is a species of marine ray-finned fish belonging to the family Latridae, the trumpeters. It has only been recorded from the Foundation Seamounts in the South Pacific Ocean.

== Taxonomy ==
The silver trumpeter was first formally described in 2003 by Clive D. Roberts with the type locality given as the top of a seamount in the Foundation Seamounts over 2,100 km (1,300 mi) s southeast of Pitcairn Island at a depth of 284 m (932 ft). The specific name pacifica refers to the only known location this species has been found at in the South Pacific Ocean.

== Description ==
The silver trumpeter has an elongate, compressed body which has a standard length 3.5 times as long as it is deep with a deeply forked caudal fin. There are 19-20 spines in the dorsal fin and 40-44 soft rays while the anal fin has 3 spines and 32-37 soft rays. There is a moderately deep incision separating the spiny part of the dorsal fin from the soft rayed part. The head and body are largely a uniform silvery grey or silvery brown colour, darker on the upper body with a whitish-grey abdomen and slate grey or light brown fins. The spiny part of the dorsal fin has a dark brown margin and the soft-rayed part of that fin has a slender dark brown stripe along is base. The anal fin has a narrow whitish strip along its base while the pectoral fin is blackish. The eye has a yellow iris and the pupil us blueish-black. The maximum total length published for this species is 69.2 cm (27.2 in).

== Distribution and habitat ==
The silver trumpeter is known only from the South Pacific Ocean at the Foundation Seamounts which are on the eastern edge of the Pacific Plate, immediately to the west of the East Pacific Ridge. It is expected that this species will be found to have a more extensive range in the central and eastern South Pacific Ocean. It is found at depths between 100 and 300 m (330 and 980 ft).

== Fisheries ==
The silver trumpeter has been caught in large amounts and landed in New Zealand.
