= Anatonu =

- Associated commune of Raivavae
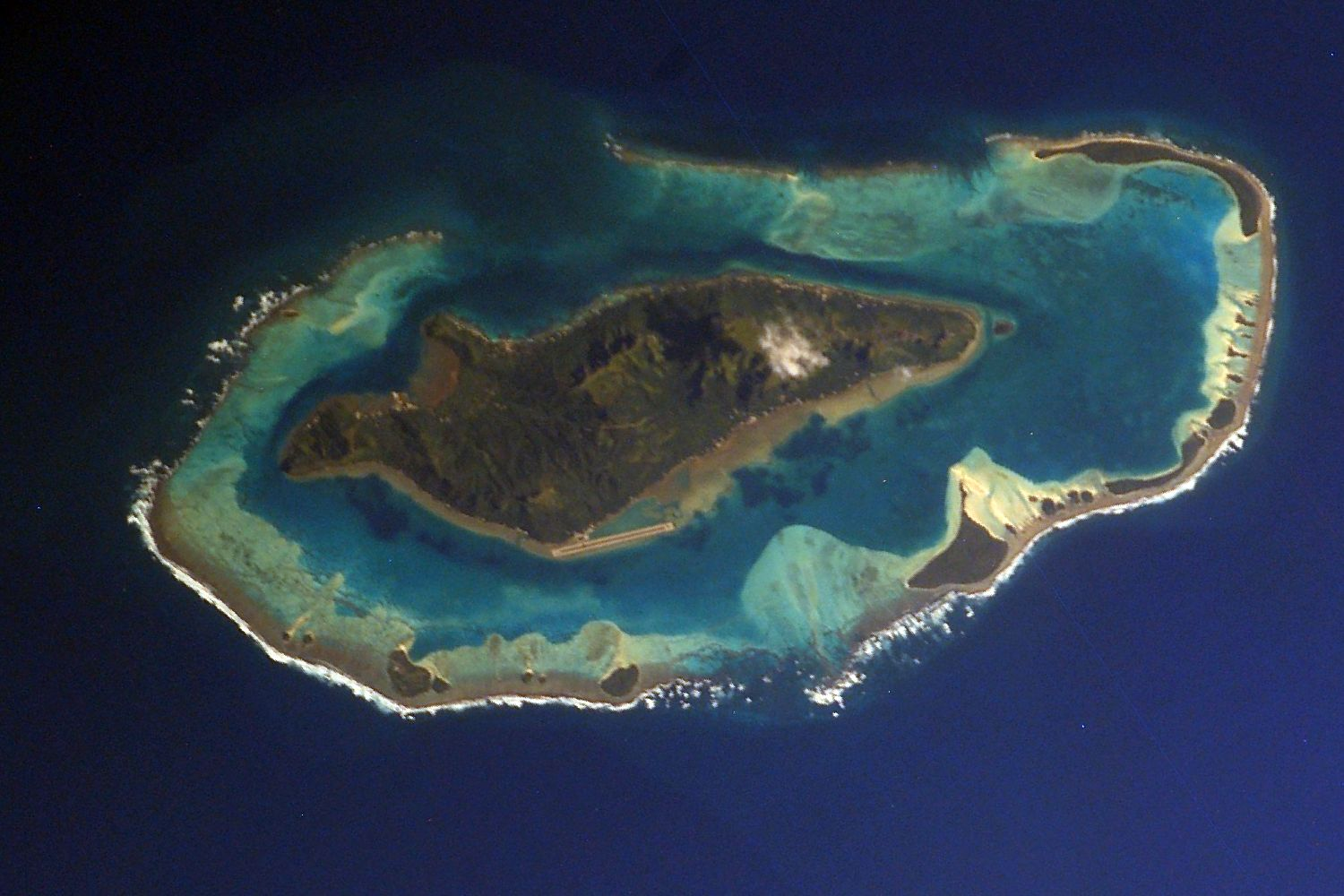
- Raivavae, the island on which Anatonu is located

- Location within French Polynesia
- Location of Anatonu
- Coordinates: 23°51′12″S 147°38′13″W
- Country: France
- Overseas collectivity: French Polynesia
- Subdivision: Austral Islands
- Commune: Raivavae
- Elevation: 7 m (23 ft)
- Population (2022): 234
- Time zone: UTC−10:00

Anatonu is an associated commune on the island of Raivavae, in French Polynesia. According to the 2022 census, it had a population of 234 people.
