= Ngatemato seamounts =

Series of seamounts in the southern Pacific Ocean

Ngatemato seamounts (Name derived from a ruling family in Rapa) are a series of seamounts in the southern Pacific Ocean.

These seamounts have the shape of ridges and display calderas. The Aureka (28°12′S 141°13′W) and Make (28°32′S 140°13′W) seamounts are part of the Ngatemato track. Dredged rocks are weakly tholeiitic basalts of Oligocene age. They are about 1,500 metres (4,900 ft) high and 20 kilometres (12 mi) wide at their base. Despite being smaller in size than the Macdonald seamounts however the Ngatemato seamounts have larger volumes which is masked by stronger plate deformation; the magma output that created the Ngatemato and Taukina chains when summed up is about 0.04 cubic kilometres per year (0.0096 cu mi/a).

The seamounts were discovered in 1996 by the RV Maurice Ewing in the Austral Islands. Potassium-argon dating yields ages of about 30 million years; the seamounts developed close to the East Pacific Rise. Away from the Austral Islands the Ngatemato seamounts merge with the Foundation seamounts, with which they may share an origin.

Macdonald seamount and associated seamounts as well as the Taukina seamounts developed close to the Ngatemato seamounts, the deformation of the Pacific Plate imposed by the Ngatemato seamounts may have triggered the formation of these other two seamounts. Alternatively the Ngatemato seamounts and Macdonald may have been formed by individual hotspots, such as the Foundation hotspot in Ngatemato's case, although the Ngatemato seamounts may to fit a lithospheric fracture-induced volcanism model better than the mantle plume model. Finally, it is possible that the formation of the seamounts was directed by the interaction between the Foundation hotspot and lithospheric fractures.
