= Vaiuru =

- Associated commune of Raivavae
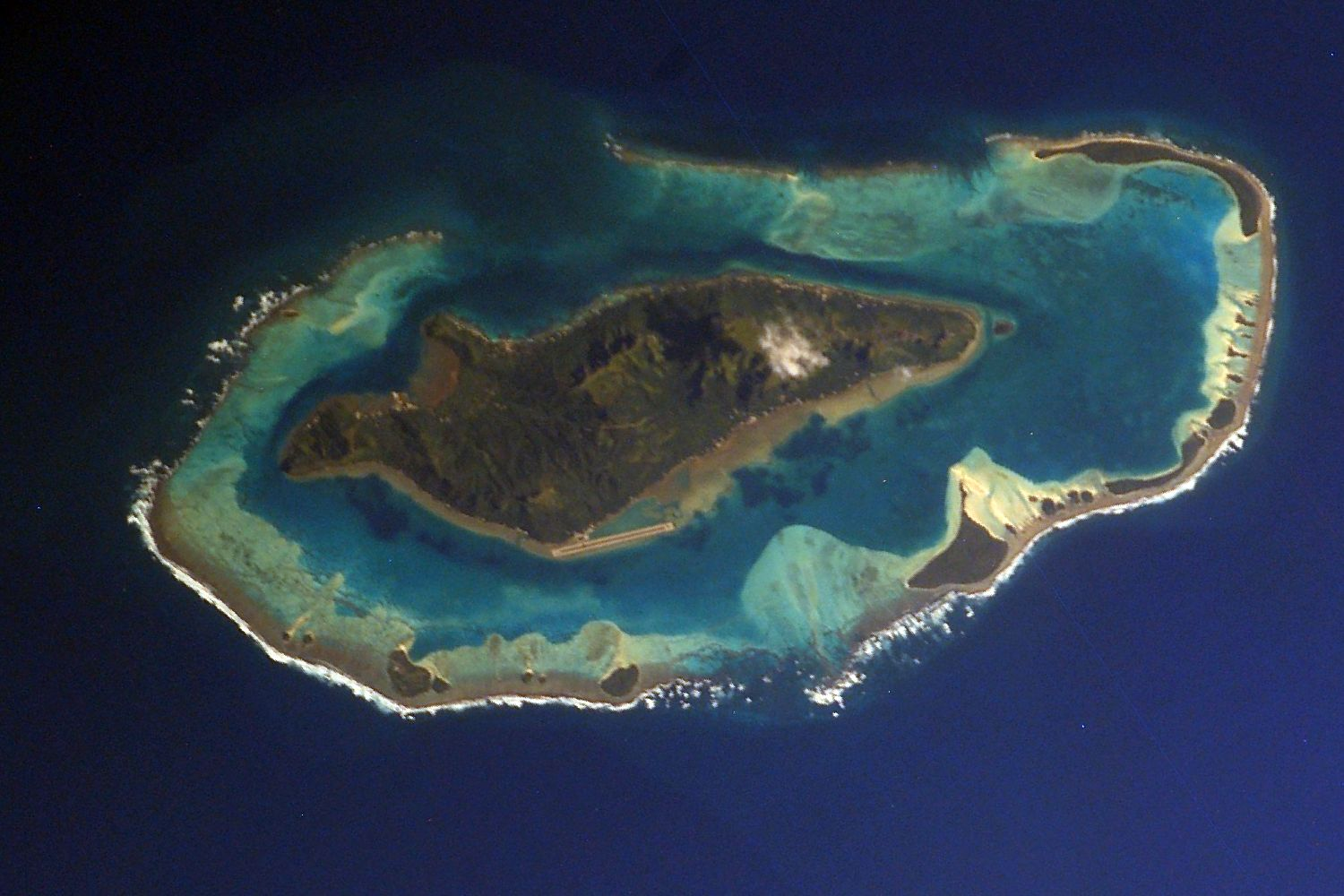
- Raivavae, the island on which Vaiuru is located

- Location within French Polynesia
- Location of Vaiuru
- Coordinates: 23°52′8″S 147°38′43″W
- Country: France
- Overseas collectivity: French Polynesia
- Subdivision: Austral Islands
- Commune: Raivavae
- Elevation: 7 m (23 ft)
- Population (2022): 182
- Time zone: UTC−10:00

Vaiuru is an associated commune on the island of Raivavae, in French Polynesia. According to the 2022 census, it had a population of 182 people.
