= Rairua-Mahanatoa =

- Associated commune of Raivavae
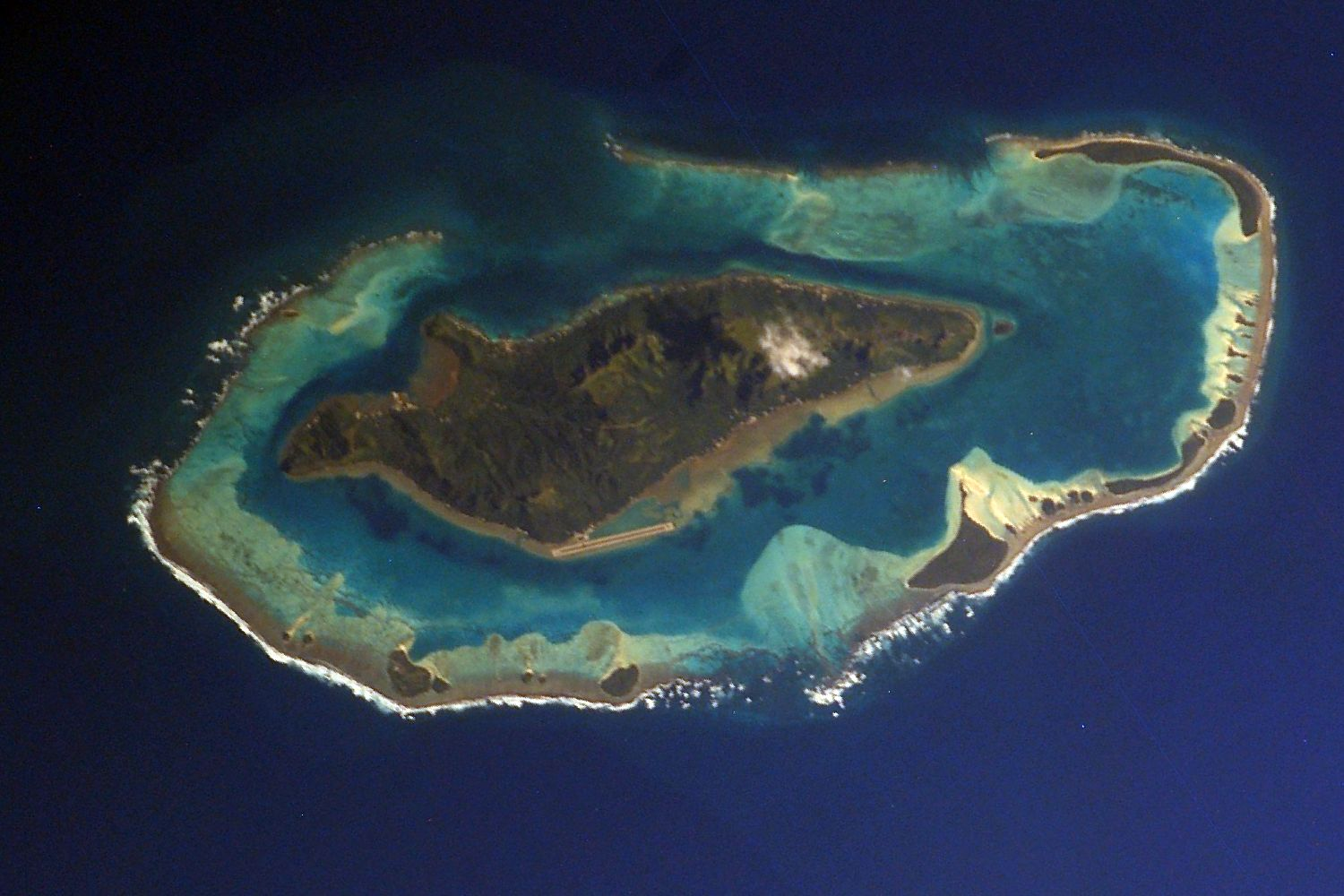
- Raivavae, the island on which Rairua-Mahanatoa is located

- Location within French Polynesia
- Location of Rairua-Mahanatoa
- Coordinates: 23°52′4″S 147°40′49″W
- Country: France
- Overseas collectivity: French Polynesia
- Subdivision: Austral Islands
- Commune: Raivavae
- Area^{1}: 8.8 km^{2} (3.4 sq mi)
- Elevation: 4 m (13 ft)
- Population (2022): 484
  - Density: 55/km^{2} (140/sq mi)
- Time zone: UTC−10:00
- ^{1} French Land Register data, which excludes lakes, ponds, glaciers > 1 km^{2} (0.386 sq mi or 247 acres) and river estuaries.

Rairua-Mahanatoa is an associated commune on the island of Raivavae, in French Polynesia. According to the 2022 census, it had a population of 484 people.

There are three villages: Rairua, the administrative center of Raivavae, Mahanatoa, and Matutea.
