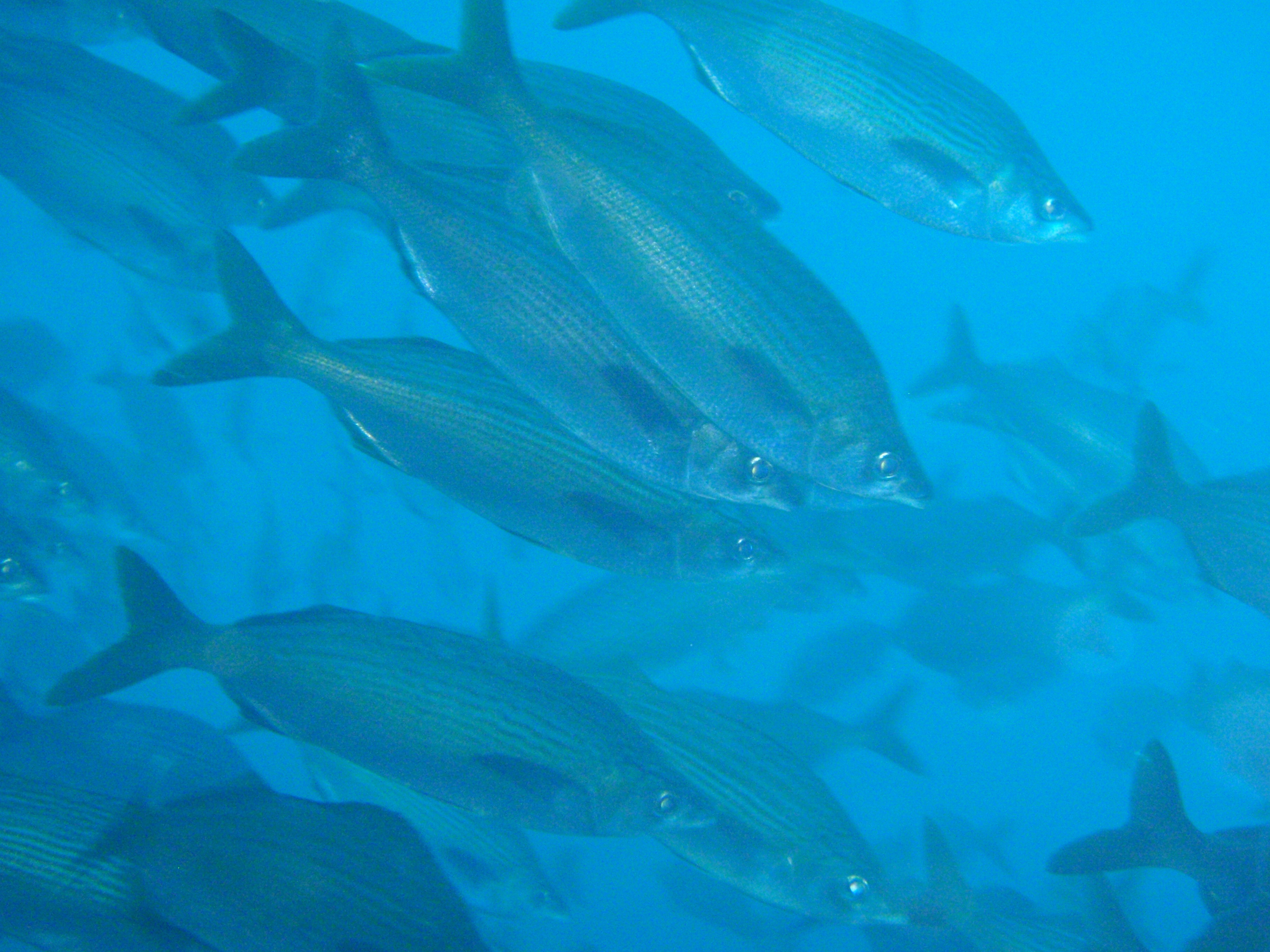
- Real bastard trumpeter (Mendosoma lineatum) at The Sisters, Tasman Peninsula

Scientific classification
- Kingdom: Animalia
- Phylum: Chordata
- Class: Actinopterygii
- Order: Centrarchiformes
- Family: Latridae
- Genus: Mendosoma
- Species: M. lineatum

Binomial name
- Mendosoma lineatum Guichenot, 1848

Synonyms
- Mendosoma elongatum Kner, 1865; Mendosoma allporti R. M. Johnston, 1881

= Mendosoma lineatum =

Species of fish

Mendosoma lineatum, the telescope fish, real bastard trumpeter or common trumpeter, is a species of marine ray finned fish belonging to the family Latridae, the trumpeters. It is native to the subantarctic and cooler temperate waters of the Southern Ocean. It inhabits tide pools and surge channels and has been found living inside such invertebrates as salps. It occurs from near the surface to a depth of about 20 metres (66 ft). This species can reach a length of 40 centimetres (16 in) TL. This species was thought to be the only known member of its genus.

== Taxonomy ==
Mendosoma lineatum was first formally described in 1848 by the French zoologist Alphonse Guichenot with the type locality given as Valparaiso Bay in Chile. Guichenot named a new genus for his new species and this species was subsequently designated as the type species of the genus Mendosoma, as Guichenot had placed three species in his new genus. The specific name lineatum means "lined", a reference to the green horizontal lines on back and flanks.

== Description ==
Mendosoma lineatum has an elongate and compressed body, the depth of the body fits into its standard length 2.7-4.3 times. Larger specimens, with a standard length in excess of 10 cm (3.9 in). may have a hump behind the head. They have a pointed snout with a small, highly protrusible mouth with one row of small conical teeth in the upper jaw and no teeth in the lower jaw or on the roof of the mouth. The dorsal fin has 22-25 spines and 23-27 soft rays while the anal fin contains 3 spines and 17-21 soft rays. This species grows to a maximum total length of 40 cm (16 in). The overall colour is dark bluish-green fading to silvery on the belly. There are rows of brown spots creating thin stripes along the flanks, becoming more reticulated in pattern on the back.

== Distribution and habitat ==
Mendosoma lineatum is found in the subantarctic and temperate waters of the Southern Ocean around New Zealand, Chile and Tasmania, as well as Gough Island in the South Atlantic, and Île Saint-Paul and Amsterdam Island in the southern Indian Ocean. This species is found on rocky reefs, frequently where there are surge channels, in tidal pools and off steep drop offs.

== Biology ==
Mendosoma lineatum aggregates in large, fast moving schools. They use their protrusible mouths to feed on plankton above the substrate. They may live within the soft tissues of some invertebrates such as salps. It has been recorded as prey for Northern rockhopper penguins (Eudyptes (chrysocome) moseleyi) and snoek (Thyrsites atun).
