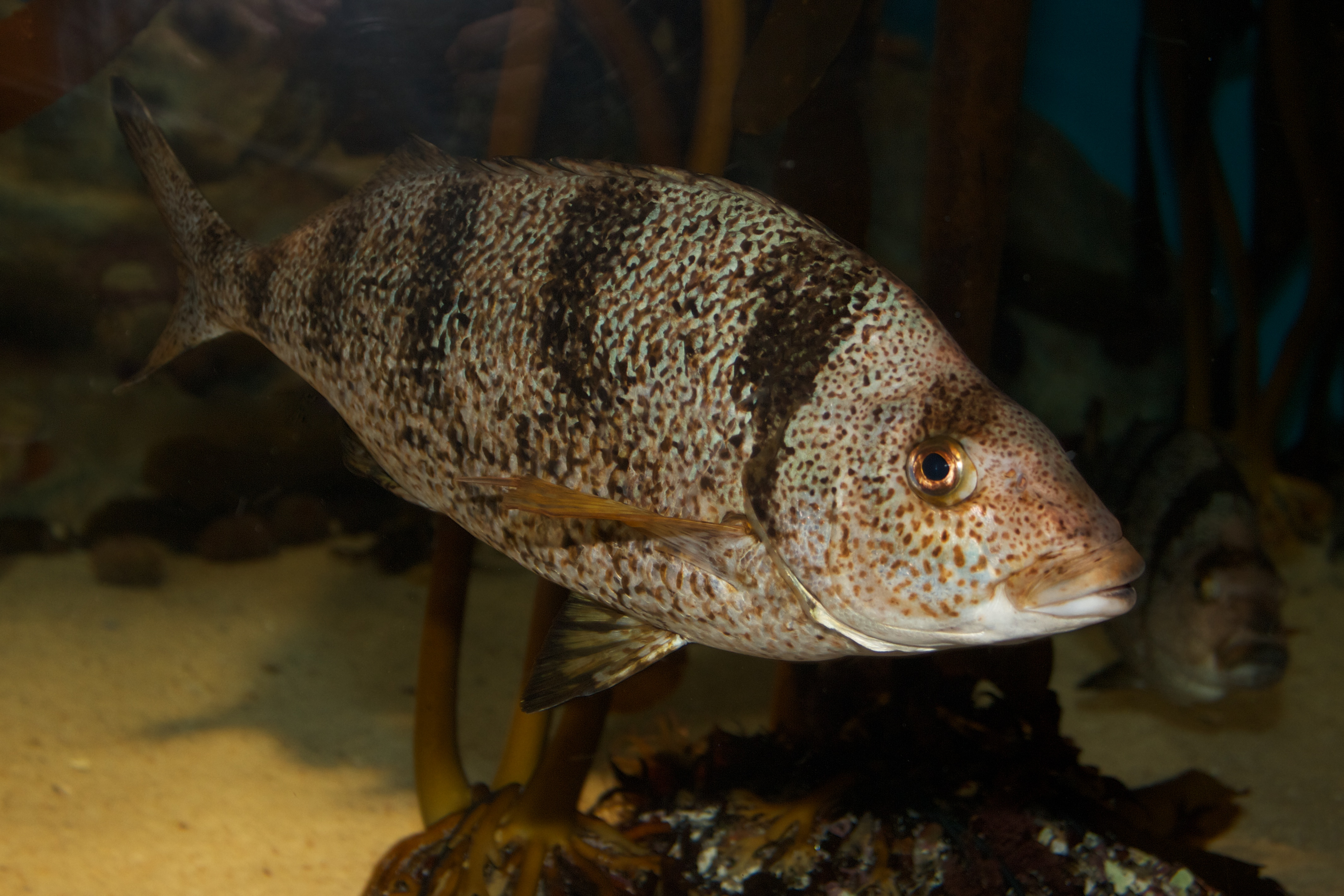

Scientific classification
- Kingdom: Animalia
- Phylum: Chordata
- Class: Actinopterygii
- Order: Centrarchiformes
- Family: Latridae
- Genus: Nemadactylus
- Species: N. monodactylus

Binomial name
- Nemadactylus monodactylus (Carmichael, 1819)

Synonyms
- Chaetodon monodactylus Carmichael, 1819; Acantholatris monodactylus (Carmichael, 1819)

= St. Paul's fingerfin =

Species of fish

St. Paul's fingerfin (Nemadactylus monodactylus), is a species of marine ray-finned fish, traditionally regarded as belonging to the family Cheilodactylidae, the members of which are commonly known as morwongs. It is native to the southwestern Indian Ocean and southeastern Atlantic Ocean.

== Taxonomy ==
The St. Paul’s fingerfin was first formally described as Chaetodon monodactylus in 1819 by the Scottish Army surgeon and botanist Dugald Carmichael with the type locality given as Tristan da Cunha. The specific name monodactylus means “one fingered”, a reference to the elongated 6th lowest fin ray in the pectoral fin. Genetic and morphological analyses strongly support the placement of Nemadactylus in the family Latridae, alongside almost all of the other species formerly classified in the Cheilodactylidae.

== Description ==
St Paul’s fingerfin has an oblong and compressed body, its shape altering as the fish grows. it has small head with a small mouth with thick, fleshy lips and small villiform teeth arranged in rows in the front of the jaws. They have a long dorsal fin which contains 17 or 18 spines and 24 to 27 soft rays while the anal fin with 3 robust spines, the middle one being the most robust, and 12 soft rays. The pectoral fins have 15 or 16 rays, of which the lowest 6 or 7 are robust, simple and extended, one of the two uppermost rays are very robust and longer than the others, reaching the anal fin spine. The pelvic fins are located quite far to the rear of the pectoral fins. The caudal fin is forked. The overall colour is grey with darker vertical bars which disappear in air. The maximum total length of this species 60 cm (24 in).

== Distribution and habitat ==
The St Paul’s fingerfin occurs around the Tristan Islands and the Vema Seamount in the South Atlantic Ocean and off Amsterdam and St Paul Island in the southwestern Indian Ocean and on the Austral Seamount and Walters Shoal. It is the commonest fish off Tristan da Cunha. This is a benthopelagic species.

== Biology ==
The St Paul’s fingerfin is a carnivorous species which feeds on benthic and pelagic animals.

== Fisheries ==
The St Paul’s fingerfin is fished for but no statistics are complied on the landings. There is a minimum size limit of 25 cm (9.8 in) on catches in Tristan da Cunha.
