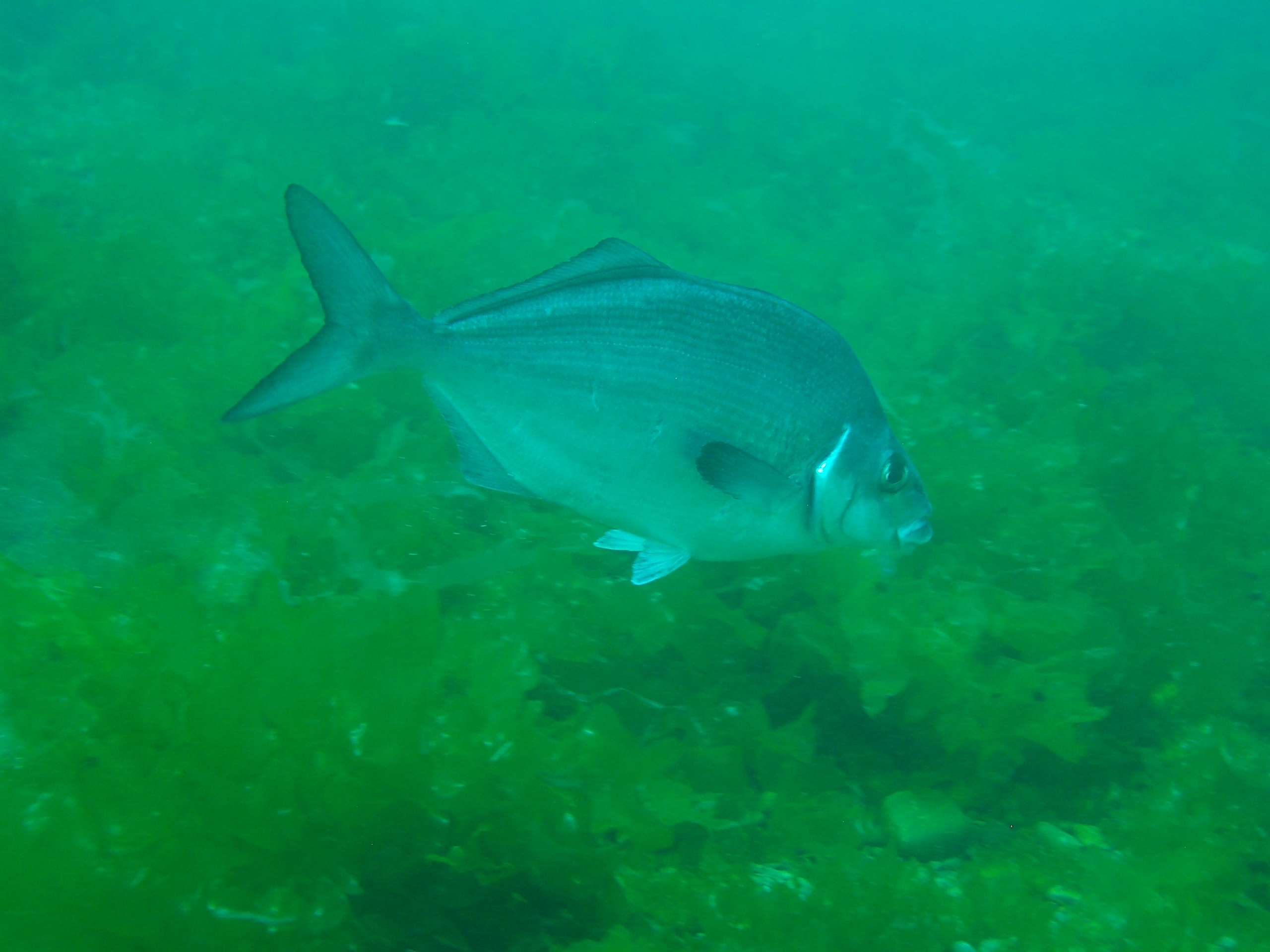

Scientific classification
- Kingdom: Animalia
- Phylum: Chordata
- Class: Actinopterygii
- Division: Teleostei
- Order: Centrarchiformes
- Family: Latridae
- Genus: Latridopsis
- Species: L. ciliaris

Binomial name
- Latridopsis ciliaris (J. R. Forster, 1801)

Synonyms
- Anthias ciliaris J. R. Forster, 1801

= Blue moki =

Species of fish from the southwestern Pacific

Blue moki (Latridopsis ciliaris) is a species of marine ray finned fish belonging to the family Latridae, the trumpeters. It is native to the southwestern Pacific Ocean around New Zealand and occasionally off southeastern Australia at depths of 10 metres (33 ft) and greater. Juveniles inhabit inshore waters, preferring rocky reefs while adults mostly occur in offshore waters forming schools over open bottoms. Some solitary adults can be found on reefs. This species can reach a length of 80 centimetres (31 in) FL, though most do not exceed 63 centimetres (25 in) TL. This species is commercially important and is also popular as a game fish.

Despite the similarities in their common names, the blue moki are not closely related to the red moki, (Chirodactylus spectabilis), a species in the genus Chirodactylus, which is also known by the alternative common name of "banded morwong".

Blue moki in New Zealand occur throughout mainland waters from the Three Kings Islands to the southern edge of the Snares Shelf, and at the Chatham Islands. A single record of blue moki from the southern end of the Kermadec Island chain was reported, but this requires verification; it is not known if the species occurs elsewhere in the Kermadecs. Blue moki are also found in small numbers at the Auckland Islands.

== Taxonomy ==
The blue moki was first formally described as Anthias ciliaris in 1801 by the German naturalist Johann Reinhold Forster with the type locality given as New Zealand. In 1862 the American ichthyologist Theodore Nicholas Gill described a new genus, Latridopsis and designated Forster's Anthias ciliaris as its type species. The specific name ciliaris means "with long lashes", a name Forster did not explain.

== Identification ==
Blue moki are very similar to the copper moki in shape and size, but they differ in colour throughout the adult stage of their lives. Blue moki are known for their piercing colours, which is an array of pink and olive. A blue moki's phenotype is true to its name - they are dark blue/grey. They have a black edge to the caudal and soft dorsal fin. Blue moki belongs to the family Latridae commonly known as trumpeter, which has 4 subspecies of abundance in New Zealand waters. The copper moki which is another member of the genus is located in New South Wales and Tasmania but is rarely seen in New Zealand waters. The colouration of blue moki changes throughout its life time from juvenile to adolescences, their body colours change from green in juveniles to green/grey and through to blue/grey in large adults.

== Geographic distribution ==
=== Natural global range ===
Past research has found that blue moki are an endemic species to New Zealand, but more recent resources suggest that blue moki distribution patterns are more widespread, with sighting of the species occurring off Tasmania and New South Wales.

=== New Zealand range ===
Blue moki are widespread throughout New Zealand. They are distributed from the Kermadec Islands to the Auckland Islands down to Stewart Island, and abundant off the east coast; they have also been recorded in the Chatham Islands. The population of blue moki on the west coast is uncertain, but there have been small commercial hauls taken off shore from New Plymouth and Greymouth.

=== Australian range ===
Blue moki are rare in Australia but have been recorded from immediately south of Botany Bay near Sydney and from Tasmania.

== Habitat ==
Blue moki are found in the continental shelf north south of the Chatham islands in depths of 10–200 metres (30–660 ft). Many adults take part in an annual migration between Kaikōura and East Cape. Juvenile blue moki are then found inshore in coastal rocky reefs; whereas adults tend to school offshore over open bottom areas. There are some adults that tend to remain on coastal reefs in shallower waters. Juvenile blue moki have been observed to prefer rocky-reef type habitats in shallow waters, most of the adult blue moki school offshore on sandy open bottom habitats but some adult blue moki do not join the schools and stay in the rocky-reef type habitats.

== Lifecycle and phenology ==
Blue moki grow at a rapid rate growing between 5–6 centimetres (2.0–2.4 in) per year, growth potentially slows with fish between the age of 10–20 years reaching 60 centimetres (24 in) and there have also been fish recorded at 33 years of age with them being over 80 centimetres (31 in) long. Blue moki can weigh up to 10 kg (22 lb 1 oz). The blue moki reach sexual maturity at 40 centimetres which equates to 5–6 years of age. Migration occurs annually. It begins in May/June (Winter) when blue moki begin to travel from Kaikōura on the East Coast on the South Island up to the only known spawning ground for blue moki in New Zealand, which is in the Māhia Peninsula to the East Cape region. Spawning occurs from August to September. They then pass back by Kaikōura in October. The larvae period of the blue moki spawn lasts about six months; from there juveniles are then found inshore in coastal rocky reefs, whereas adults tend to school offshore over open bottom areas. There are some adults that tend to remain on coastal reefs in shallower waters New Zealand. Blue moki mortality other than for commercial fishing reasons is low.

== Diet and foraging ==
Blue moki feeds at the bottom, on a wide range of benthic invertebrates. It consumes a mouthful of turfing substrate, it then winnows out the prey. Blue moki intestines are often found with ingested sand and mud. This is a result of them feeding on benthic species such as crabs, gastropod, bivalve molluscs, polychaete worms and Munida gregaria. They also feed on juvenile sea urchins. Juvenile blue moki are located on reefs and eat small crustaceans amongst seaweeds, while adults prey on crabs, other crustaceans, shellfish and worms, which they suck from the sand or mud.

== Predators ==
Blue moki are seen as a 'game' fish in New Zealand and are commercially fished, this is why Humans are seen as one of blue moki's predators. Blue moki stocks were seriously depleted in New Zealand in 1975. Humans are the blue moki's largest predator, which fishes them commercially using set nets in the areas between East Cape and Kaikōura. Catches have been consistent at around 400 tonne per year; fish mortality other than commercial fishing is low. Moki are also caught recreationally through spear fishing and boat fishing in small catch.

== Parasites ==
Group	Species	Location on host
Monogenea	Mediavagina latridis	Gills
Digenea	Genoliena dactylopagri	Stomach
Digenea	Holorichis pulcher	Intestines
Digenea	Proctoeces sp.	Posterior intestine
Digenea	Tubulovesicular angusticauda	Stomach
Nematoda	Cucullanellus sheardi	Stomach
Copepoda	Aethon morelandi	Stomach
Copepoda	Lepeophtheirus erecsoni	Gills
Copepoda	Lepeophtheirus sp.	Skin

== Cultural use ==
Māori view blue moki as having special significance in community and life believing that blue moki spawn in Cape runaway and that there are traditional fishing grounds for blue moki where customary fishing practices took place in earlier times. Iwi also consider fishing blue moki by set nets in the area a cultural offence.

== Commercial fisheries ==
Blue moki is mostly caught on the east coast of New Zealand between Otara and Kaikōura it is a low value fishery. The commercial catch is caught as a bycatch of trawling and set netting for other target species. There are management practices in place for the blue moki fisheries such as a minimum catch size of 40 cm, area restrictions on certain types of fishing methods and a minimum net size of 114mm for target set net fishing of blue moki

== Recreational fisheries ==
Blue moki are a very popular fish targeted by recreational fishermen, they are caught in a variety of ways such as spearfishing, catching on the rod and reel and set netting like commercial fisheries they are legally required to be above 40 cm (16 in) in length and a minimum set net mesh size of 114 mm (4.5 in). There is also a bag limit of 15 fish per person.
