= President Thiers Bank =

Broad guyot, northwest of Rapa, southeast of Raivavae, in the Austral Islands

- Summit depth: 33 metres (108 ft)

Location
- Coordinates: 24°40′S 145°55′W

Geology
- Type: Guyot

President Thiers Bank is a broad guyot, which lies northwest of Rapa and 200 kilometres (120 mi) southeast of Raivavae, in the Austral Islands. Its summit reaches a depth of 33 metres (108 ft). It may have been created by the Macdonald hotspot. Another theory sees in the seamount the endpoint of an alignment that starts with Aitutaki and also involves one volcanic phase at Raivavae.
