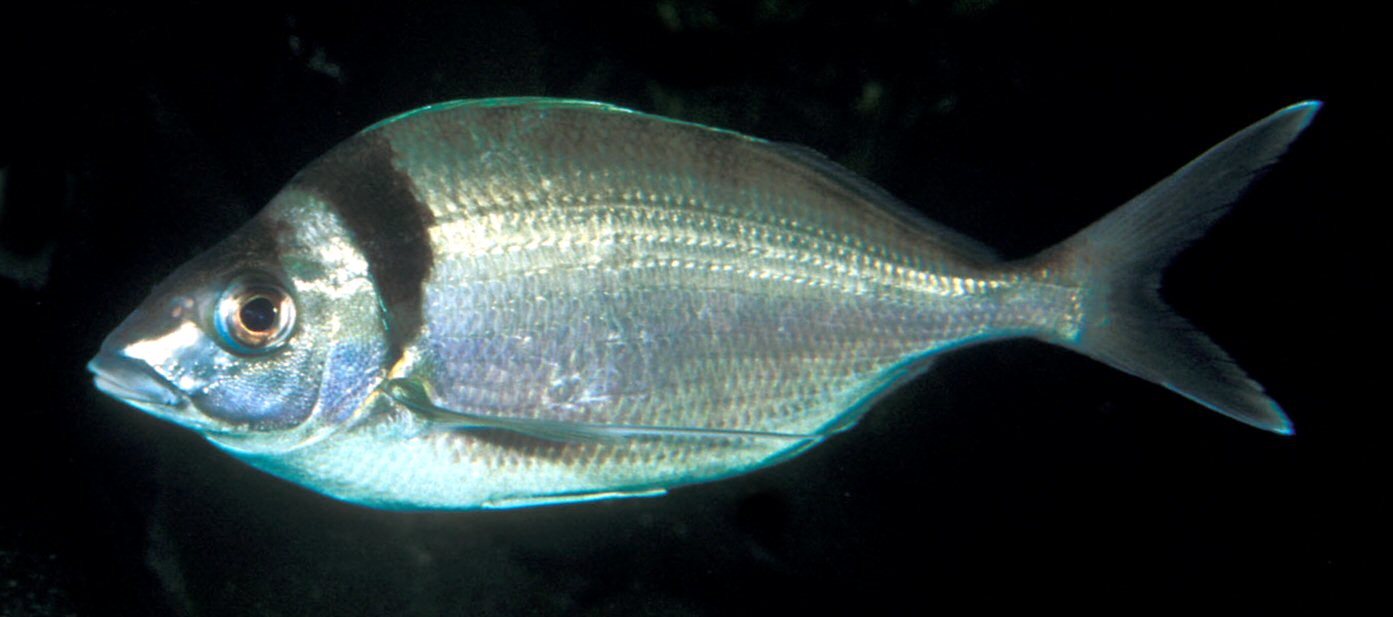

Scientific classification
- Kingdom: Animalia
- Phylum: Chordata
- Class: Actinopterygii
- Division: Teleostei
- Order: Centrarchiformes
- Family: Latridae
- Genus: Nemadactylus
- Species: N. macropterus

Binomial name
- Nemadactylus macropterus (J. R. Forster, 1801)
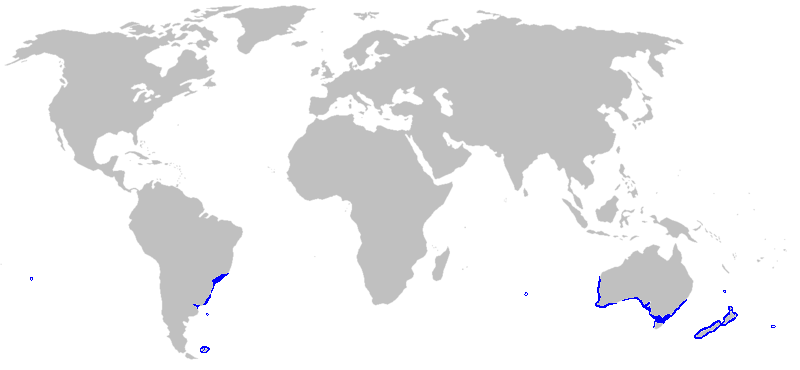
- Range (in blue)

Synonyms
- Cichla macroptera Forster, 1801; Cheilodactylus macropterus (Forster, 1801); Dactylopagrus macropterus (Forster, 1801)

= Nemadactylus macropterus =

Species of fish

Nemadactylus macropterus, the tarakihi, jackass morwong or deep sea perch, is a species of marine ray-finned fish, traditionally regarded as belonging to the family Cheilodactylidae, the members of which are commonly known as morwongs. It is found in the south western Pacific Ocean, in Australia and New Zealand. Although there are records from the southern Indian Ocean and southwestern Atlantic, these may be due to misidentifications of similar species.

== Taxonomy ==
The species was first formally described in 1801 as Cichla macroptera by the German naturalist Johann Reinhold Forster, with the type locality given as New Zealand. In 1839 Sir John Richardson described a new species, Nemadactylus concinnus from Tasmania, creating the monotypic genus Nemadactylus for it. N. concinnus was later considered to be a synonym of Forster's C. macroptera, making this species the type species of the genus Nemadactylus as Richardson's N. concinnus. The specific name macropterus means "long-winged", a reference to the very elongated seventh ray of the pectoral fins. Genetic and morphological analyses strongly support the placement of Nemadactylus in the family Latridae, alongside almost all of the other species formerly classified in the Cheilodactylidae.

== Description ==
Nemadactylus macropterus has 17–18 spines and 25–28 soft rays in its dorsal fin and 3 spines and 14–15 soft rays in its anal fin. It attains a maximum total length of 70 cm (28 in), although 35 cm (14 in) is more typical, and a maximum published weight of 2.9 kg (6.4 lb). This is a large species with an overall silvery colour with a wide black band or crescentic marking which runs from the nape to the base of the pectoral fin. The seventh pectoral fin ray is elongated. The fins are light to dark-greyish without any clear markings. The juveniles are also silvery but have dark bands or blotches on their upper bodies.

== Distribution and habitat ==
The fish is found in Australia and New Zealand. In Australia it occurs along the southern coast from Broken Bay, New South Wales to Rottnest Island, Western Australia, its range encompassing Tasmania too. It is widespread in New Zealand, occurring from Cape Reinga to the seas immediately south of the Snares Islands, on the shallower areas on the Chatham Rise and off the Chatham Islands. There are reports of this species from South America and islands in the southern Indian Ocean but it is thought that these may be misidentifications of similar looking congeners. It is found on deep reefs in depths down to 400 m (1,300 ft), although they are known to enter large coastal bays at times.

== Biology ==
Nemadactylus macropterus have a maximum lifespan of approximately 35 years, and become mature at the age of 3–6 years. They spawn between February and June. The young N. macropterus are found in high density in the inner and mid shelf, while the adults reside on the outer continental shelf. This species has a diet of benthic invertebrates including polychaetes, crustaceans, molluscs and echinoderms. There are known regular spawning aggregations in New Zealand waters and individuals have been known to migrate up to 500 km (310 mi) from their home range to breed.

== Fishing ==
The species has been overfished on the east coast of New Zealand for six decades, with the total weight of breeding stock at 8% of what it was without fishing, as of 2026. On the west coast it had fallen to 28%. Stock is considered overfished when it is below 20%. The Environmental Defence Society called for the fishery to be closed to allow stock to recover.
