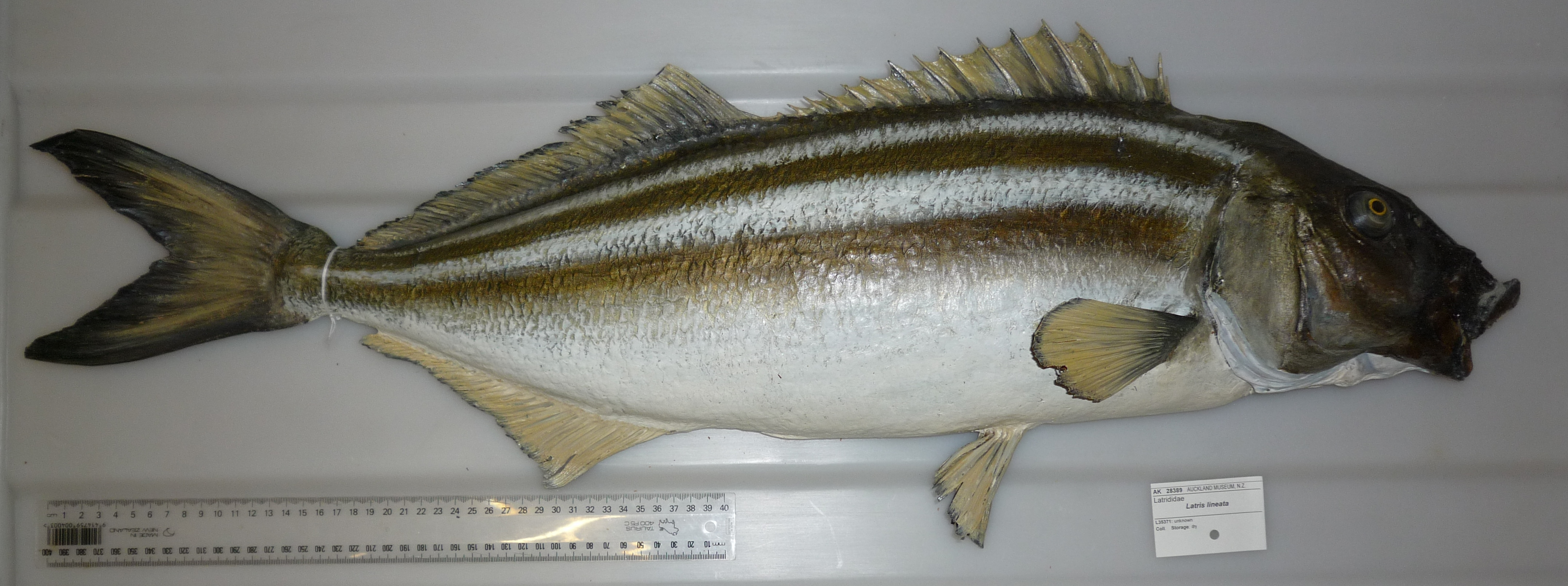
- Latris lineata

Scientific classification
- Kingdom: Animalia
- Phylum: Chordata
- Class: Actinopterygii
- Order: Centrarchiformes
- Family: Latridae
- Genus: Latris; J. Richardson, 1839

Type species
- Latris hecateia J. Richardson, 1839

= Latris =

Genus of fishes

Latris is a genus of marine ray finned fish belonging to the family Latridae, the trumpeters. They are found in the southern oceans.

== Taxonomy ==
Latris was first formally described in 1839 by the Scottish naval surgeon, naturalist and Arctic explorer Sir John Richardson with the type species being Latris hecateia, this being the only species in the genus. Richardson’s name was later shown to be a synonym of Johann Reinhold Forster’s Cichla lineata. The name of the genus, Latris, means “slave” or “servant”, Richardson did not explain why he chose this name.

== Species ==
There are currently two recognized species in this genus:

- Latris lineata (J. R. Forster, 1801) (Striped trumpeter)
- Latris pacifica C. D. Roberts, 2003 (Silver trumpeter)

== Characteristics ==
Latris has two species which, although molecular analyses suggest that they are sister species, share few obvious derived morphological characteristics which separate them from other Latrid genera. Before the discovery of Latris pacifica it was thought that the presence of vomerine teeth was a character separating the genus from the others in the family but L. pacifica does share this characteristic. Meristic counts are of doubtful usefulness but these fishes have a dorsal fin with 17-20 spines and 33-44 soft rays, while the anal fin has 26-37 soft rays. They also have 37-43 vertebrae. The maximum total lengths are 69.2 cm (27.2 in) for L. pacifica and 120 cm (47 in) for L. lineata.

== Distribution and habitat ==
Latris species are found in the temperate southern oceans. Latris lineata has been confirmed to occur in the southern Indian Ocean, the South Pacific Ocean and the Southern Atlantic. L. pacifica have only been recorded from the Foundation Seamounts in the South Pacific Ocean. They are associated with rocky reef habitats.

== Fisheries ==
Latris trumpeters are quarry for commercial fisheries from New Zealand while in other parts of its range the striped trumpeter is a desirable target for recreational fisheries. Their flesh is considered to be highly palatable.
