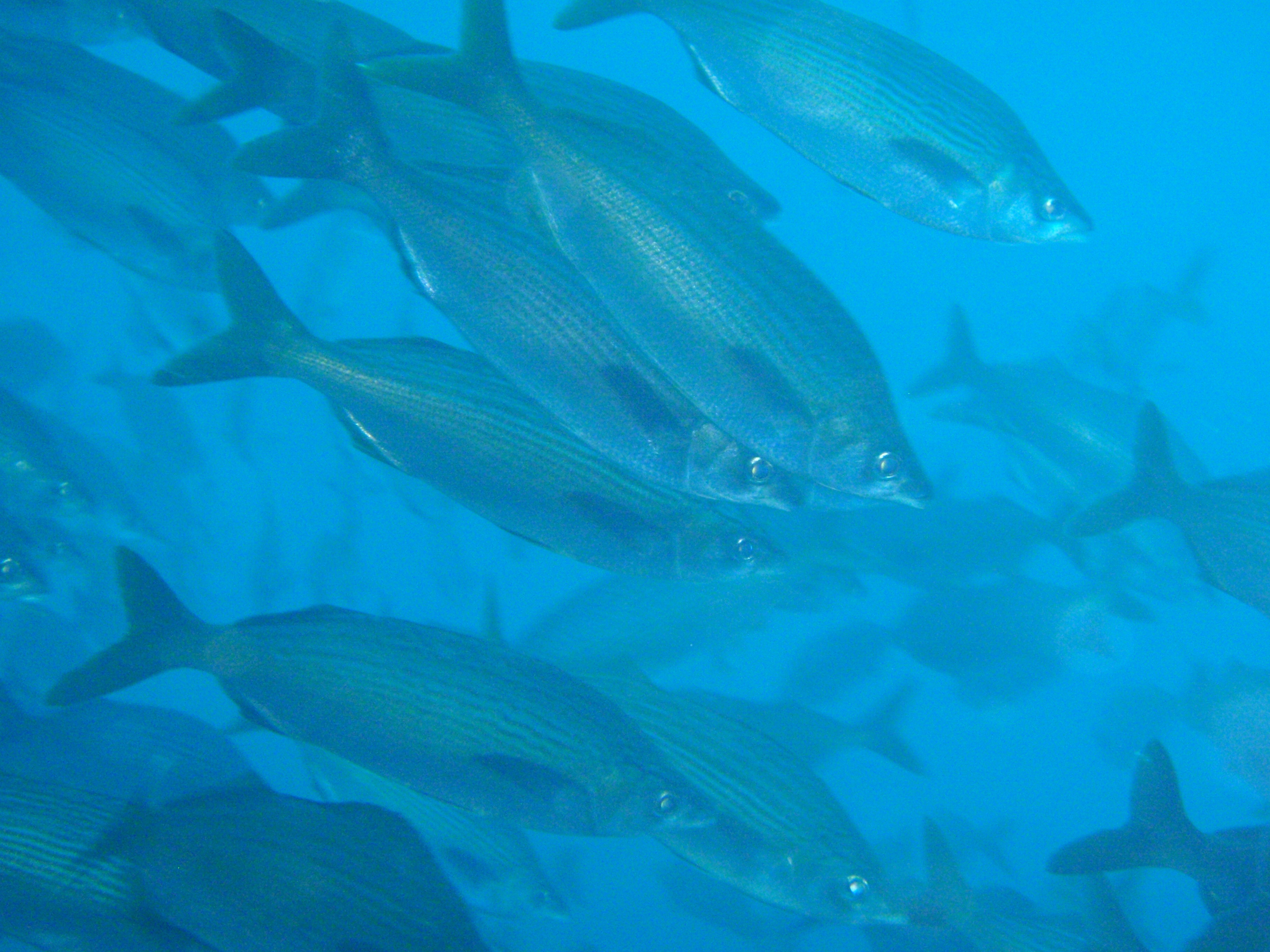
- Real bastard trumpeter (Mendosoma lineatum) at The Sisters, Tasman Peninsula

Scientific classification
- Kingdom: Animalia
- Phylum: Chordata
- Class: Actinopterygii
- Order: Centrarchiformes
- Family: Latridae
- Genus: Mendosoma; Guichenot, 1848

= Mendosoma =

Genus of fishes

Mendosoma is a genus of marine ray finned fish belonging to the family Latridae, the trumpeters.

== Taxonomy ==
Mendosoma was first formally described in 1848 by the French zoologist Alphonse Guichenot.

Some authorities consider the genus Mendosoma to be monotypic, but others recognise three species within the genus:

- Mendosoma caerulescens Guichenot, 1848
- Mendosoma fernandezianum Guichenot 1848
- Mendosoma lineatum Guichenot, 1848

Both M. caerulescens and M. fernandezianum have been considered nomina dubia in the past.

The generic name, Mendosoma, was created by combining the word méndola, a Spanish name for the blotched picarel (Spicara maena), and soma meaning "body", referring to the similarity in body shape between M. lineatum and S. maena.
