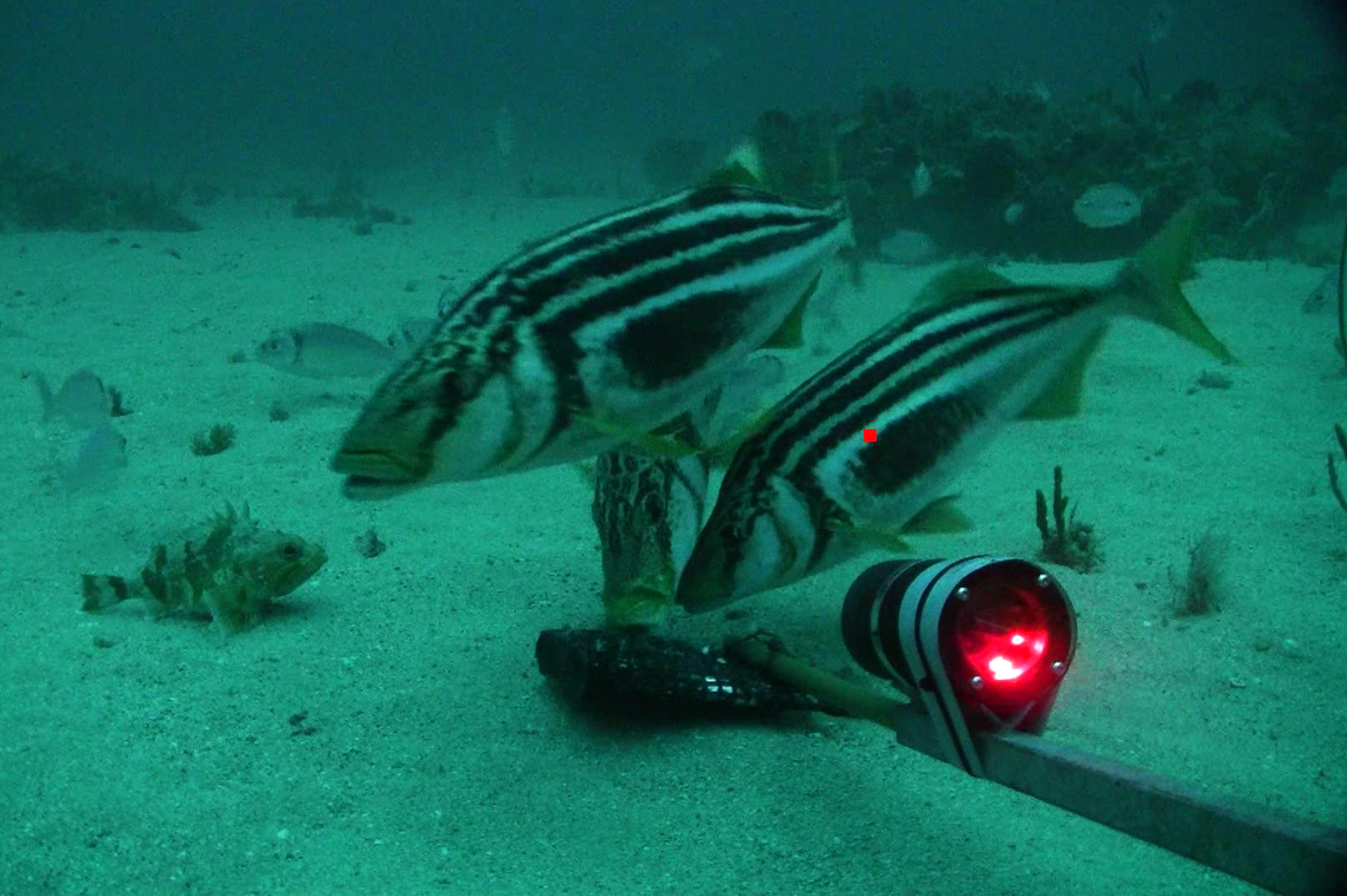

Scientific classification
- Kingdom: Animalia
- Phylum: Chordata
- Class: Actinopterygii
- Order: Centrarchiformes
- Family: Latridae
- Genus: Latris
- Species: L. lineata

Binomial name
- Latris lineata (J. R. Forster, 1801)

Synonyms
- Cichla lineata J. R. Forster, 1801; Latris hecateia J. Richardson, 1839; Sciaena lineata J. R. Forster, 1844; Latris mortoni Saville-Kent, 1886

= Latris lineata =

Species of fish

Latris lineata, the striped trumpeter, common trumpeter, copper moki, Hobart-town trumpeter, kokikohi, real trumpeter, Tasmanian striped trumpeter or Tasmanian trumpeter, is a species of marine ray-finned fish belonging to the family Latridae, the trumpeters. It is native to rocky reefs in the temperate oceans of the southern hemisphere.

== Taxonomy ==
Latris lineata was first formally described in 1801 as Cichla lineata by the German naturalist Johann Reinhold Forster with the type locality given as New Zealand. Sir John Richardson described the genus Latris in his description of Latris hecateia, its only species, and this species was later found to be synonymous with Forster's Cichla lineata. The specific name lineata means "lined", a reference to the dark horizontal lines in the body.

== Description ==
Latris lineata has an elongate, compressed body, with a standard length which is around 3 times its depth, with a relatively long snout and a convex space between the eyes. The small mouth is terminal and does not reach beyond the nostrils when closed, it has small villiform teeth on each jaw with the outer band having the largest teeth. There are 6-7 irregular rows of teeth on the upper jaw and 4-5 in the lower jaw, There is also a patch of recurved vomerine teeth. The dorsal fin has 17-19 spines and 33-38 soft rays while the anal fin has 3 spines and 26-30 soft rays. There is a deep incision between the spiny and soft rayed parts of the dorsal fin and the caudal fin is deeply forked. This species attains a maximum total length of 120 cm (47 in) with a maximum known weight of 25 kg (55 lb) The background colour of the upper body is light olive with three dark olive longitudinal stripes along the upper flanks and a thick indistinct band along the lower flanks and a dark stripe running from the snout to the front of the dorsal fin. The lower body is silvery with a yellowish sheen.

== Distribution and habitat ==
Latris lineata is found in the southern oceans off southern Australia, the islands in the southern Indian and Atlantic Oceans, although it is not found in the coastal waters of South Africa. In Australia its range extends from southern New South Wales to Albany, Western Australia, as well as round Tasmania. In New Zealand it is common throughout the archipelago but is rarer in the waters north of East Cape. It has also been found in the southwestern Atlantic off Argentina and in the fjords of Chilean Patagonia. They inhabit rocky reefs at depths of from 50 to 400 m (160 to 1,310 ft).

== Biology ==
Latris lineata are thought to migrate from inshore to offshore waters to breed. The striped trumpeter is long lived, attaing a maximum known age of 43 years. Its diet is dominated by a wide variety of benthic invertebrates including bivalves, crustaceans and cephalopods.

== Fisheries and aquaculture ==
Latris lineata is regarded as an excellent food fish. It is targeted by both recreational and commercial fisheries, bottom trawls and droplines being used to catch it commercially. It has been considered as a suitable species for aquaculture in Tasmania but production still faces several significant challenges, for example the high incidence of urinary calculi during the larval stage.
