= Taukina seamounts =

Underwater mountains on the Pacific Plate

Coordinates: 27°S 141°W

Taukina seamounts are a series of seamounts on the Pacific Plate. The Macdonald hotspot and the Ngatemato seamounts are located nearby. The Taukina and Ngatemato seamounts were discovered in 1996 by the RV Maurice Ewing and both are named after families in Rapa Iti.

The Taukina seamounts are formed by small volcanoes, with heights of 1,500–1,000 metres (4,900–3,300 ft) and widths of 6–10 kilometres (3.7–6.2 mi). They often feature a caldera on their summit. Tholeiitic rocks make up the seamounts.

The shape of the Taukina seamounts resembles that of the seamounts that form on the East Pacific Rise. An alternate theory of origin is that the Ngatemato seamounts deformed the Pacific plate enough with their weight to trigger the eruption of magma.
