= Raivavae =

Island in French Polynesia

- Commune
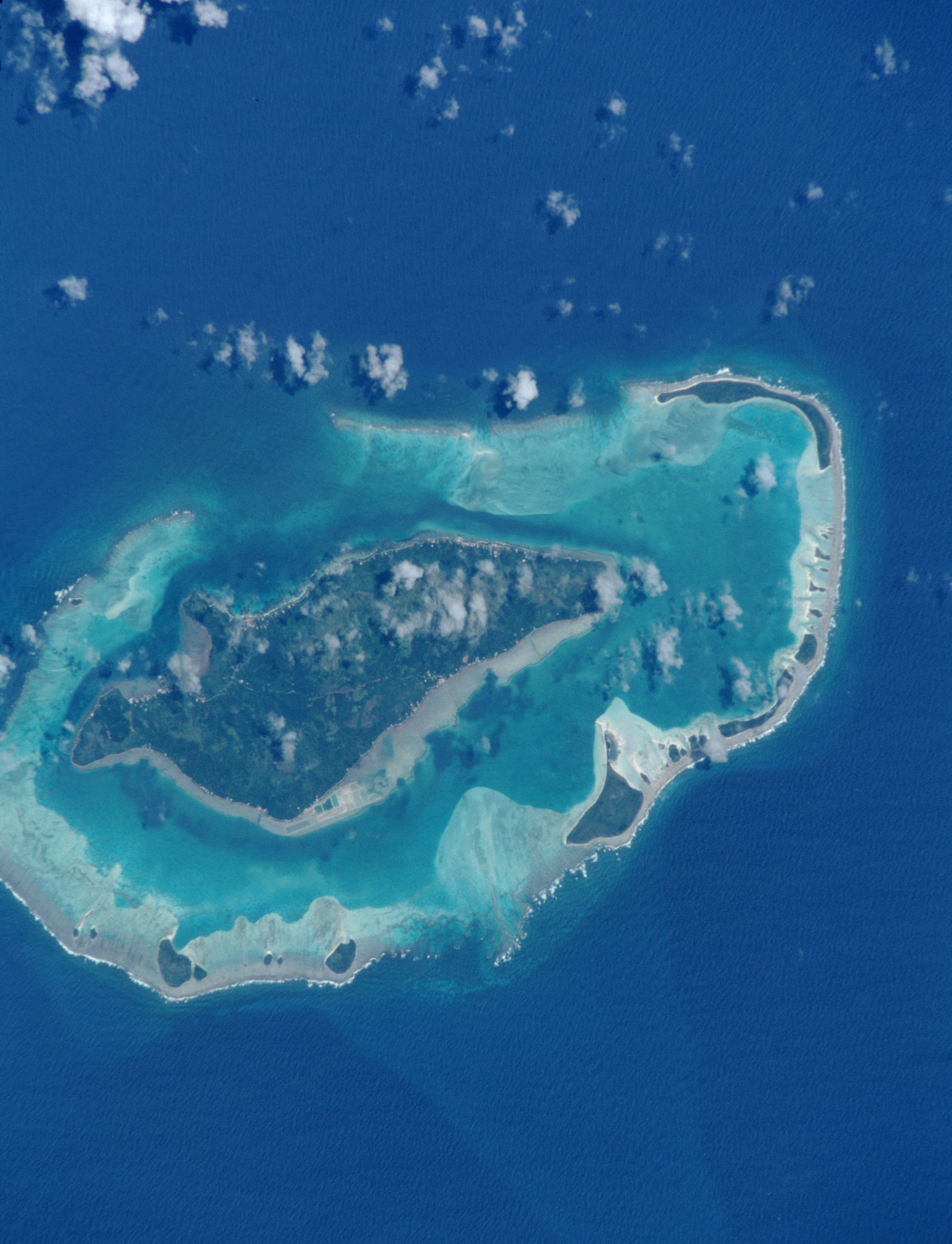
- NASA astronaut photo of Raivavae island, 2001

- Flag

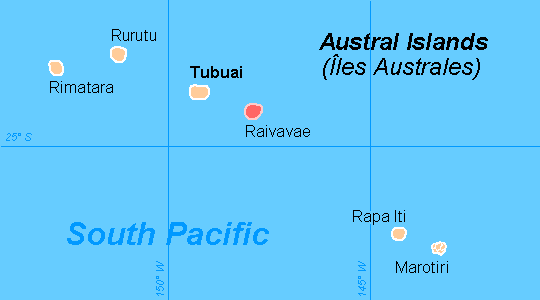
- Location of Raivavae
- Location within France
- Coordinates: 23°52′09″S 147°39′49″W
- Country: France
- Overseas collectivity: French Polynesia
- Subdivision: Austral Islands
- Area^{1}: 17.9 km^{2} (6.9 sq mi)
- Highest elevation: 437 m (1,434 ft)
- Lowest elevation: 0 m (0 ft)
- Population (2022): 900
  - Density: 50/km^{2} (130/sq mi)
- Time zone: UTC−10:00
- INSEE/Postal code: 98739 /98750
- ^{1} French Land Register data, which excludes lakes, ponds, glaciers > 1 km^{2} (0.386 sq mi or 247 acres) and river estuaries.

Raivavae (Tahitian: Ra‘ivāvae /ra.ʔi.va:va.e/) is one of the Austral Islands in French Polynesia. Its total land area including offshore islets is 17.9 km^{2} (6.9 sq mi). At the 2022 census, it had a population of 900. The island is of volcanic origin, and rises to 437 metres (1,434 ft) elevation at Mont Hiro.

== History ==
The first sighting by Europeans was recorded by the Spanish naval officer Tomás Gayangos on board of the frigate El Aguila on 5 February 1775. Gayangos had taken over the command of the expedition of Domingo de Bonechea of 1774 after his death in Tahiti and was returning to the Viceroyalty of Peru. The main source describing this sighting is that of José Andía y Varela, pilot of the packet boat Jupiter that accompanied El Aguila in this return trip. On 6 February, a boat was sent in, and made contact with the inhabitants at the shore edge, but landing was not made. Raivavae was charted as Santa Rosa by the Spaniards, who recorded as Oraibaba the name of the island said by the inhabitants.

The island was annexed by France in 1880.

== Geography ==
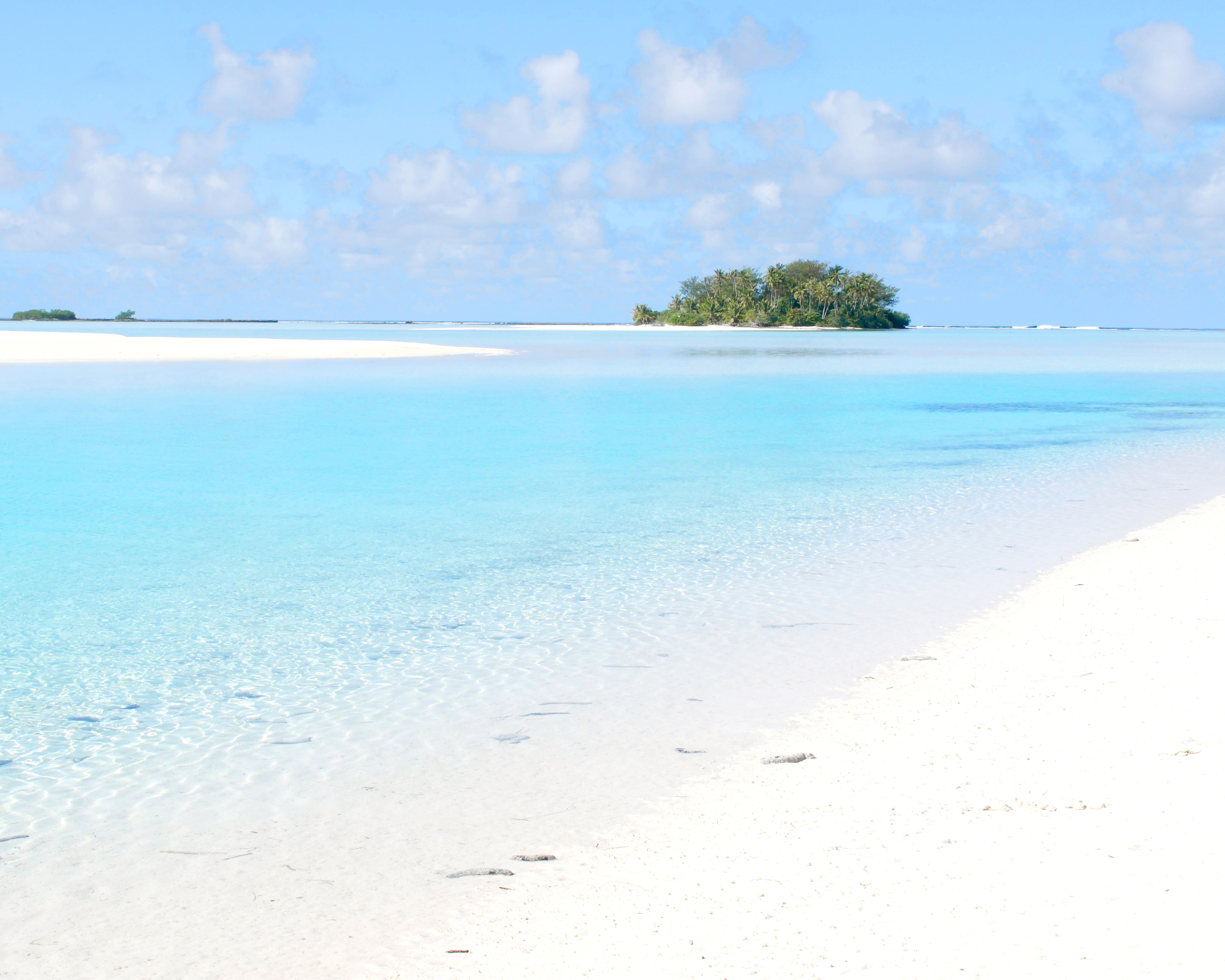
View from motu Vaiamanu on Raivavae

Raivavae is a volcanic island that culminates with Mont Hiro at an altitude of 437 meters. Its land area is 16 km^2. It is surrounded by a fairly large lagoon, but smaller than that of Tubuai. The surrounding coral reef comprises twenty-eight motu (islets). It is 630 km southeast of Tahiti.

Raivavae lies in the Cook-Austral volcanic chain, a series of submarine volcanoes and volcanic islands that stretches along the south of the Pacific Plate. The central island of Raivavae was formed from a hotspot on the Pacific Plate, whose magma production ended about 6.5 million years ago.

The main island has four villages: Anatonu on the north coast, Rairua and Mahanatoa on the west coast, and Vaiuru on the east coast.

The native language of Raivavae is a variant of the Austral language called Reo Raivavae.

== Administration ==
The islands of Raivavae are administratively within the commune with the same name. Raivavae consists of the following associated communes:

- Anatonu
- Rairua-Mahanatoa
- Vaiuru

== See also ==
- Islands controlled by France in the Indian and Pacific oceans
