= Liopropoma carmabi =

Candy basslet

Conservation status
- Least Concern (IUCN 3.1)

Scientific classification
- Kingdom: Animalia
- Phylum: Chordata
- Class: Actinopterygii
- Division: Teleostei
- Order: Perciformes
- Family: Liopropomatidae
- Genus: Liopropoma
- Species: L. carmabi

Binomial name
- Liopropoma carmabi J. E. Randall, 1963

Species of fish

Liopropoma carmabi, the candy basslet, is a species of fish in the family Liopropomatidae.

== Taxonomy ==
The candy basslet is part of the family Serranidae (sea bass, groupers and reef basslets), one of 37 species of reef basslets in the tribe Liopropomini. L. carmabi has many similarities with two other Liopropoma species; the Swissguard basslet (L. rubre) and the Swales basslet (L. swalesi), including size and coloration. However, its more defined and intense coloration distinguishes it from the other two species.

== Description ==
Liopropoma carmabi tend to be smaller than most Liopropoma species with a body length of up to 6 centimetres (2.4 in). Typically, males are on average 5.1 centimetres (2.0 in) and females 4.45 centimetres (1.75 in). L. carmabi have approximately 6-7 dorsal spines and 12-13 dorsal soft rays. The head, body, and caudal fin of the candy basslet are striped; horizontal, alternating orange and lavender stripes, separated by red lines, run down the length of the fish. Two black dots are found on the rear margin of the caudal fin. This species possesses gill rakers. The candy basslet possesses ctenoid scales on its entire body except for the lips and a small portion on the front of the snout. Its caudal fin is rounded, and the anal fin originates behind the second dorsal fin's origin. Like other Liopropoma species, they have a somewhat elongated body.

== Distribution ==
Liopropoma carmabi is one of five species of Liopropoma that reside in the deep waters of the tropical Atlantic Ocean, ranging from the Florida Keys and Bahamas, and along the eastern Caribbean, to as far as the northern coast of South America. It is most commonly found near the island of Curacao. The fish lives at a depth of 15–70 metres (50–230 ft), though other sources state a range of 25–100 metres (80–330 ft).

== Habitat and ecology ==
L. carmabi is widely distributed in its range. They can be locally common, being found over rocky reefs especially areas with abundant rock shelter, rubble, and fewer corals, as this cryptic species hides in coral recesses.

=== Reproductive behavior ===
In secluded areas, candy basslet court by swimming parallel to each other with their opercula in contact. The spawn of other Epinephelinae are carried by currents towards the open sea, and this is also assumed to be the case across Liopropoma. Liopropoma carmabi has the most unique larva compared to other larvae of the family Serranidae.

=== Diet ===
In captivity, L. carmabi take small crustaceans such as brine shrimp, krill, and crabs that fit into the basslet's relatively small mouth.

== Conservation ==
The invasive lionfish of the genus Pterois is known to prey on candy basslets, but the extent of this threat is yet to be determined. Due to a lack of major threats, and a wide distribution across the tropical Atlantic, the candy basslet is listed as Least Concern, although the assessment requires updating. Commercially, due to their defined and appealing coloration, aquarium trade is desirable but rare, because of the difficulty to reach their deep habitats. Ornamental marine fishes are known to be high in abundance in India. Liopropoma carmabi are used in ornamental fish trading due to their striking color. An individual of the species is worth $1,000 ranking it at #10 for the world's most expensive tropical fish from India.
