= Liopropoma collettei =

Scientific classification
- Kingdom: Animalia
- Phylum: Chordata
- Class: Actinopterygii
- Order: Perciformes
- Family: Liopropomatidae
- Genus: Liopropoma
- Species: L. collettei

Binomial name
- Liopropoma collettei J. E. Randall & L. R. Taylor, 1988

Species of ray-finned fish

Liopropoma collettei, commonly known as Collette's basslet, is a species of marine ray-finned fish, in the family Serranidae. It was first described in 1988 by John Ernest Randall and Leigthon R. Taylor Jr., and was named in recognition of American ichthyologist, Dr Bruce Baden Collette.

== Distribution ==
It is found in the seas off Papua New Guinea, Philippines, Indonesia, Johnston Atoll and the Hawaiian Islands.
