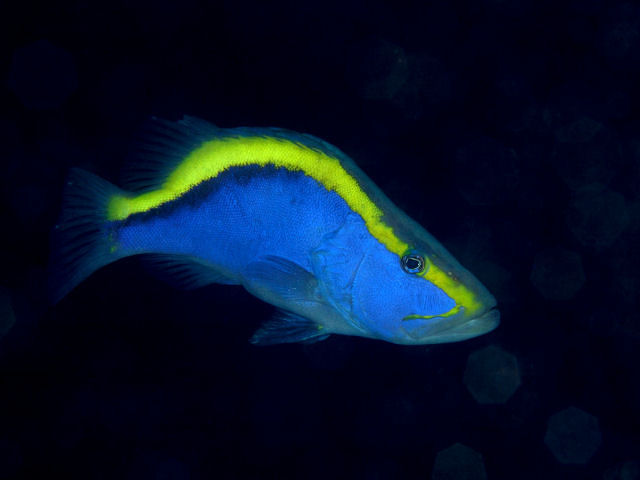

Conservation status
- Least Concern (IUCN 3.1)

Scientific classification
- Kingdom: Animalia
- Phylum: Chordata
- Class: Actinopterygii
- Order: Perciformes
- Family: Liopropomatidae
- Subfamily: Diploprioninae
- Genus: Aulacocephalus; Temminck & Schlegel, 1843
- Species: A. temminckii

Binomial name
- Aulacocephalus temminckii Bleeker, 1854

Synonyms
- Aulacocephalus schlegelii Günther, 1859; Centropristis saponaceus Valenciennes, 1862; Aulacocephalus saponaceus (Valenciennes, 1862)

= Goldribbon soapfish =

Species of fish

The goldribbon soapfish (Aulacocephalus temminckii), also known as the goldribbon cod, blue and gold soapfish, gold ribbon grouper or goldstripe groper, is a species of marine ray-finned fish, related to the groupers and included in the subfamily Epinephelinae which is part of the family Serranidae, which also includes the anthias and sea basses. It is found in the Indo-Pacific region.

== Description ==
The goldribbon soapfish is a deep blue coloured grouper which has a bold yellow stripe which runs from the stripe through the eye and along the back to the base of the caudal fin. The dorsal fin contains 9 spines and 12 soft rays while the anal fin has 3 spines and 9 soft rays. This species attains a maximum standard length of 40 centimetres (16 in).

== Distribution ==
The goldribbon soapfish has a wide, disjunct Indo-Pacific distribution. It occurs in the northern Red Sea, off northern South Africa and southern Mozambique, the Comoros, Réunion and Mauritius in the western Indian Ocean. It has also been recorded from the Maldives. In the Western Pacific Ocean it is found as far north as the Ryukyu Islands of southern Japan, off Korea, Taiwan and southern China. It has been recorded off Thailand and in the Philippines. It also occurs off Australia and New Zealand, Norfolk Island and in French Polynesia.

== Habitat and biology ==
The goldribbon soapfish is found on rocky reefs where it lives in caves and underneath crevices, at depths of 20 to 604 metres (66 to 1,982 ft). It is a carnivorous species which feeds on fishes and crustaceans. These fish have a toxin, grammistin, which is produced in their skin and which has a bitter taste, the production of the toxin is increased when the fish is threatened.

== Taxonomy ==
The goldribbon soapfish was first formally described in 1854 by the dutch ichthyologist, herpetologist and physician Pieter Bleeker (1819-1874) with the type locality given as Japan. The genus was created in 1843 by the Dutch zoologist Coenraad Jacob Temminck (1778-1858) and his student, the German ichthyologist Hermann Schlegel (1804-1884) and was originally described without any species until Bleeker added this species. The generic name is a compound of the Greek aulos which means "flute" and kephales which means "head".

== Utilisation ==
The goldribbon soapfish is rare species in the aquarium trade.
