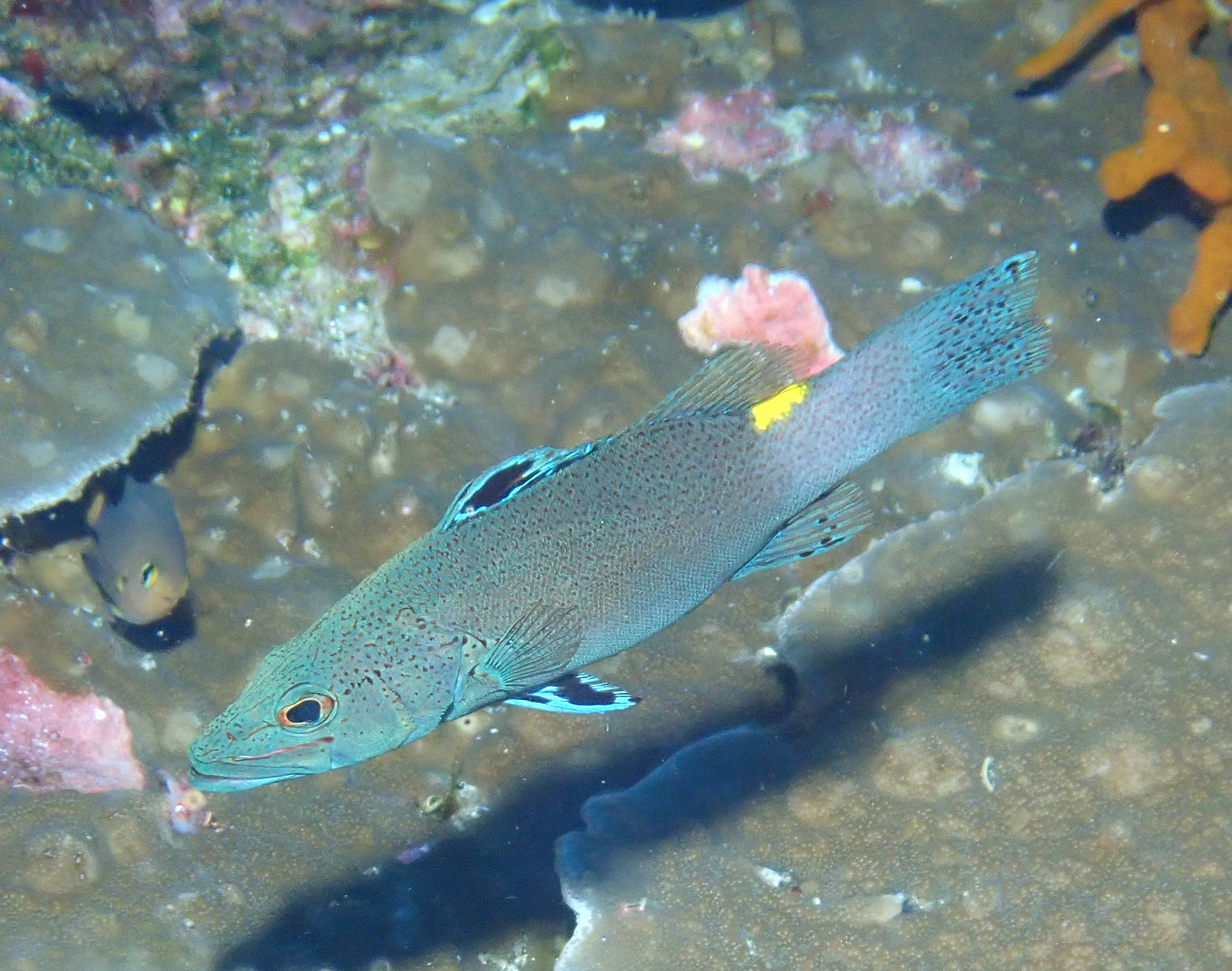
- Belonoperca chabanaudi

Scientific classification
- Kingdom: Animalia
- Phylum: Chordata
- Class: Actinopterygii
- Order: Perciformes
- Suborder: Percoidei
- Family: Liopropomatidae
- Subfamily: Diploprioninae
- Genus: Belonoperca; Fowler & B.A. Bean, 1930

Type species
- Belonoperca chabanaudi Fowler & B.A. Bean, 1930

Species
- see text

= Belonoperca =

Genus of fishes

Belonoperca is a genus of marine ray-finned fish, related to the groupers and included in the subfamily Epinephelinae, part of the family Serranidae, which also includes the anthias and sea basses. They are found in the Indo-Pacific region.

== Characteristics ==
The species within Belonoperca are elongated, predatory fish that produce the toxin grammistin in the mucus on their skin. The two species in the genus have 9 spines in their dorsal fin, although B, chabanaudi may have 10, and both have 10 dorsal fin rays. Other members of the tribe Diploprionini have more dorsal fin rays than the species of Belonoperca. They also differ from related fishes in the arrangement of the spines and rays in the anal fin.

== Species ==
There are two species within the genus Belonoperca:

| Image | Species | Common name |
|---|---|---|
| | Belonoperca chabanaudi Fowler & B.A. Bean, 1930 | Arrowhead soapfish |
| | Belonoperca pylei Baldwin & Smith, 1998 | Orangespotted soapfish |

== Utilisation ==
The soapfishes in the genus Belonoperca are sometimes found in the aquarium trade.
