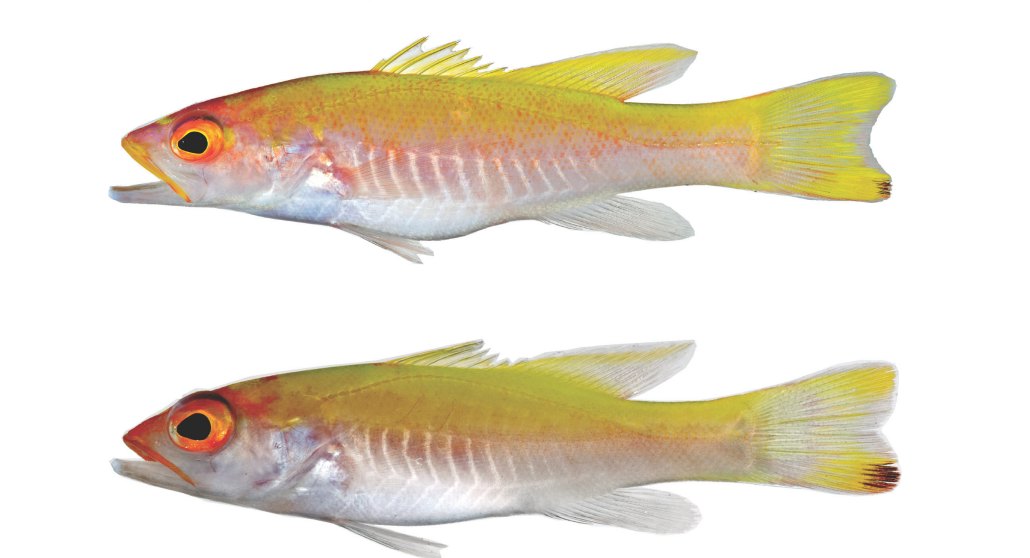

Conservation status
- Data Deficient (IUCN 3.1)

Scientific classification
- Kingdom: Animalia
- Phylum: Chordata
- Class: Actinopterygii
- Order: Perciformes
- Family: Liopropomatidae
- Genus: Liopropoma
- Species: L. santi

Binomial name
- Liopropoma santi Baldwin & D. R. Robertson, 2014

= Liopropoma santi =

Species of fish

Liopropoma santi, the spot-tail golden bass, is a species of marine ray-finned fish, related to the groupers and classified within the subfamily Epinephelinae of the family Serranidae. It has been collected from deep reefs off Curaçao, southern Caribbean; it is the deepest occurring Liopropoma species in the Atlantic Ocean.

== Discovery ==
Liopropoma santi, along with another basslet, Liopropoma olneyi, were discovered during dives by crewed submersibles in 300 metres (980 ft) deep waters off Curaçao in the Caribbean. The project was funded by the Smithsonian Institution's National Museum of Natural History.

== Description ==
Liopropoma santi, like two other related bass species, L. aberrans and L. olneyi, has a golden body but can be differentiated from other Liopropoma species in the Western Atlantic in a number of ways. The diagnostic feature of the fish is the presence of a dark spot on the lower part of its caudal fin (tail fin), which feature gives the species its common name. The lower part of the fish body is of a colour ranging from pale yellow to white. The upper lip of the fish has a yellowish to orange coloured stripe along it and it has a series of white, striped markings on the ventral portion of the trunk resembling "chevrons". The dorsal fin has 13 spines and an indented margin.

== Etymology ==
The specific epithet santi commemorates Roger Sant, a philanthropist and supporter of the Smithsonian Institution who was present at the crewed submersible dive in which an exemplar of L. santi was collected.

== Habits ==
Of all the species of Liopropoma, L. santi resides at the deepest levels of the reef, having been sighted only between 182 and 241 metres (597 and 791 ft). When approached by a submersible with lights it took shelter in caves and crevices in the reef.
