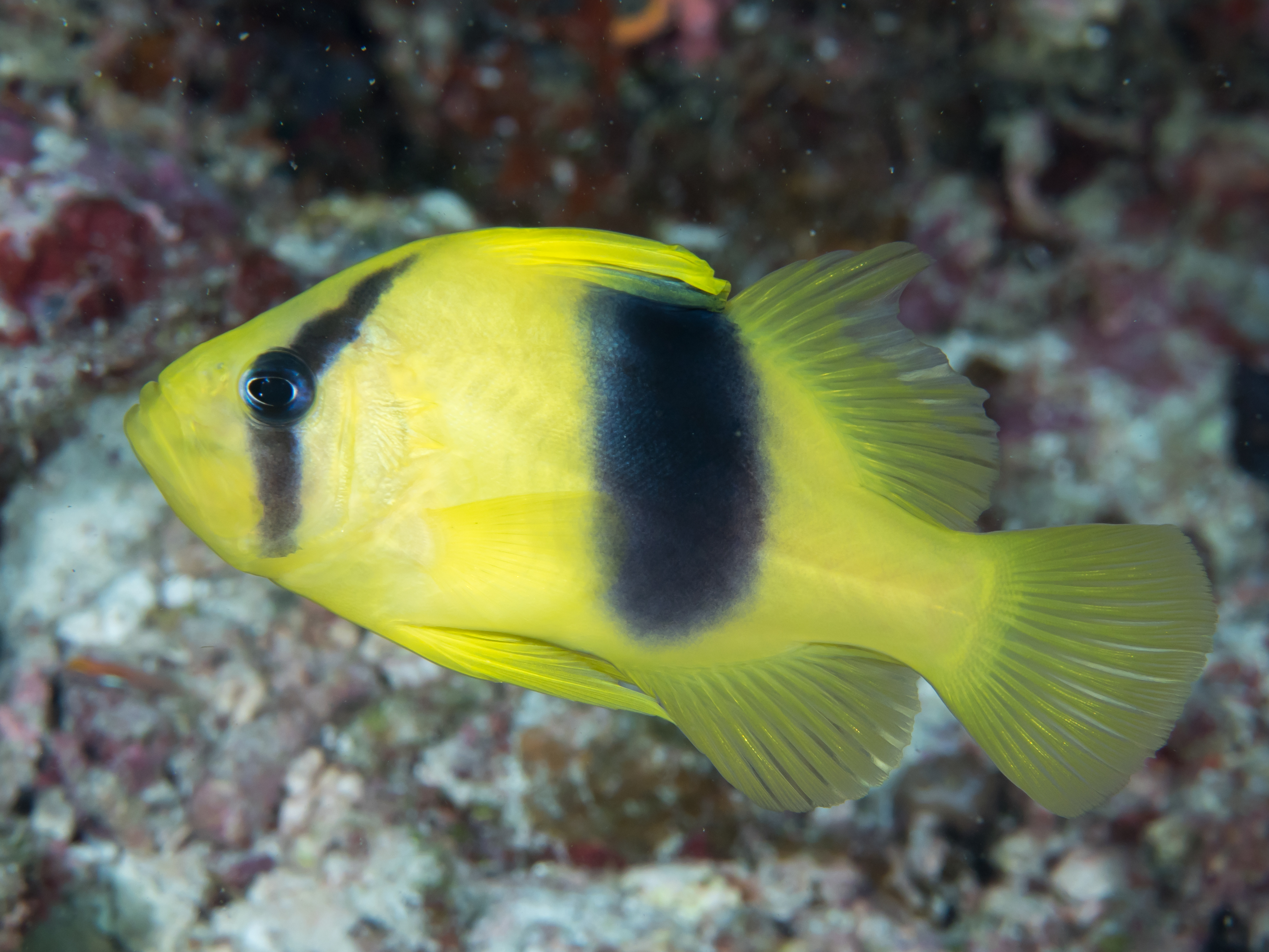

Conservation status
- Least Concern (IUCN 3.1)

Scientific classification
- Kingdom: Animalia
- Phylum: Chordata
- Class: Actinopterygii
- Order: Perciformes
- Family: Liopropomatidae
- Genus: Diploprion
- Species: D. bifasciatum

Binomial name
- Diploprion bifasciatum Cuvier, 1828

= Diploprion bifasciatum =

Species of fish

Diploprion bifasciatum, the barred soapfish, also known as the double-banded soapfish, two banded grouper, two-banded sea perch, two-banded soapfish, yellow emperor or yellow striped grouper, is a species of marine ray-finned fish, related to the groupers and included in the subfamily Epinephelinae which is part of the family Serranidae, which also includes the anthias and sea basses. It is found in the Indo-Pacific region.

== Description ==
Diploprion bifasciatum' is a species with a compressed, moderately deep body that 3–3.4 times longer than its depth. Its body is almost all covered with small ctenoid scales. The dorsal fin has a deep incision between its spined and soft rayed parts. It has long pelvic fins which extend past the spiny portion of the anal fin. The dorsal fin has 8 spines and 13–16 soft rays while the anal fin contains 3 spines and 12–13 soft rays. The colour of this species normally ranges from pale yellow or greyish-yellow to bright yellow with a dark bar which runs through the eye and another wider dark band on the posterior part of its body with yellow fins. The larger fishes can be nearly all black with yellow fins. The small juveniles are bluish in colour on the anterior part of their bodies and yellow on the posterior part, they also have a spiny part of the dorsal fin coloured black. The juveniles appear to mimic whichever local species of venomous blennies in the genus Meiacanthus which are blue or grey in colour. This species attains a maximum total length of 25 centimetres (9.8 in).

== Distribution ==
Diploprion bifasciatum has a wide distribution in the Indo-West Pacific. Its range extends from the Maldives and India east to Papua New Guinea, the Solomon Islands and New Caledonia, north as far as southern Japan south to Australia. In Australia its distribution extends from Rottnest Island in Western Australia to the Solitary Islands Marine Park in New South Wales, although juveniles may be found further south. They are also found around Lord Howe Island in the Tasman Sea.

== Habitat and biology ==
Diploprion bifasciatum prefers coastal habitats in semi-silty conditions but also occur in the vicinity of caves and crevices in rocky and coral reefs. It is found at depths of 1 to 50 metres (3.3 to 164.0 ft). It is a predatory species that is able to feed on relatively large prey which is captured and swallowed whole with its highly protrusible jaws. Analysis of stomach contents has shown that it feeds mainly on fishes and crustaceans. When stressed this species secretes the skin toxin grammistin.

== Taxonomy ==
Diploprion bifasciatum was first formally described in 1828 by the French naturalist and zoologist Georges Cuvier (1769-1832). Cuvier based his description on material collected by the German naturalist Heinrich Kuhl (1797-1821) and the Dutch physician, zoologist, botanist and mycologist Johan Conrad van Hasselt (1797-1823) and their unpublished descriptions of those specimens which they collected at the type locality of Java. It is the type species of the genus Diploprion.

== Utilisation ==
Diploprion bifasciatum is uncommon in the aquarium trade but is the most frequently encountered species of soapfish in that trade.
