= Liopropoma maculatum =

Scientific classification
- Kingdom: Animalia
- Phylum: Chordata
- Class: Actinopterygii
- Order: Perciformes
- Family: Liopropomatidae
- Genus: Liopropoma
- Species: L. maculatum

Binomial name
- Liopropoma maculatum (Döderlein, 1883)

Synonyms
- Pikea maculatum Döderlein, 1883

Species of ray-finned fish

Liopropoma maculatum is a species of marine ray-finned fish, in the family Serranidae.

== Distribution ==
It resides in the seas off Japan, Korea, and the Hawaiian Islands.
