= Liopropoma susumi =

Conservation status
- Least Concern (IUCN 3.1)

Scientific classification
- Kingdom: Animalia
- Phylum: Chordata
- Class: Actinopterygii
- Division: Teleostei
- Order: Perciformes
- Family: Liopropomatidae
- Genus: Liopropoma
- Species: L. susumi

Binomial name
- Liopropoma susumi (Jordan & Seale, 1906)

Synonyms
- Chorististium susumi Jordan & Seale, 1906; Liopoproma susumi (Jordan & Seale, 1906); Ypsigramma susumi (Jordan & Seale, 1906); Flagelloserranus meteori Kotthaus, 1970; Ypsigramma brocki Schultz, 1953; Ypsigramma lineata Schultz, 1953

Species of ray-finned fish

Liopropoma susumi, commonly known as the pinstripe reef basslet, the meteor basslet, or the meteor perch, is a species of marine ray-finned fish in the family Serranidae. It was first described by David Starr Jordan and Alvin Seale in 1906. It is found in the Pacific Ocean.

== Description ==
It is typically a brownish-grey to reddish color with brownish-yellow stripes running across its body. It averages 9.1 cm (3.6 in) TL.
