= Liopropoma emanueli =

Scientific classification
- Kingdom: Animalia
- Phylum: Chordata
- Class: Actinopterygii
- Order: Perciformes
- Family: Liopropomatidae
- Genus: Liopropoma
- Species: L. emanueli

Binomial name
- Liopropoma emanueli Wirtz & Schliewen, 2012

Species of fish

Liopropoma emanueli, the Cape Verde basslet, is a species of marine ray-finned fish, related to the groupers and classified within the subfamily Epinephelinae of the family Serranidae. It is endemic to the Atlantic waters around Cape Verde, western Africa where it is found in rocky areas at depths of 20 to 36 metres (66 to 118 ft). Its length is 10 to 12 cm.

== Description ==
Liopropoma emanueli shows the angular face which is typical of its genus and has a torpedo shaped body and it can be distinguished from the other species within the genus by have an obviously split dorsal fin, the spiny part and the soft rayed part are not joined, these are joined in congeners. It is mainly orange to pink in overall colour with a single obvious, wide, yellow stripe extending from the tip of the snout over much of the body. It also has many, thin yellow horizontal, lines along its body. The dorsal fin contains 8 spines and 11 soft rays while the anal fin has 3 spines and 8 soft rays. This species attains a maximum standard length of 12.4 centimetres (4.9 in).

== Distribution ==
Lioporopoma emanueli is endemic to Cape Verde.

== Habitat and biology ==
Lioporopoma emanueli was first observed along the face of a vertical wall which was covered with the sun coral Tubastrea aurea, at a depth of 36 metres (118 ft). When approached it retreated into a small, one of a number of bucket to bathtub-sized cavities in the wall caves. Later more were observed in the same area but even later more fish were later seen in other areas, where there were large boulders clothed with black coral of the genera Antipathella and Tanacetipathes. In these area the fish took shelter underneath the boulders when approached.

== Taxonomy ==
Liopropoma emanueli was first formally described in 2012 by Peter Wirtz and Ulrich K. Schliewen with the type locality given as Dive site "Danger" near Tarrafal on Santiago, Cape Verde. The specific name honours the biologist, Emanuel d’Oliveira, who accompanied on the Wirtz on the dives which discovered this species.
