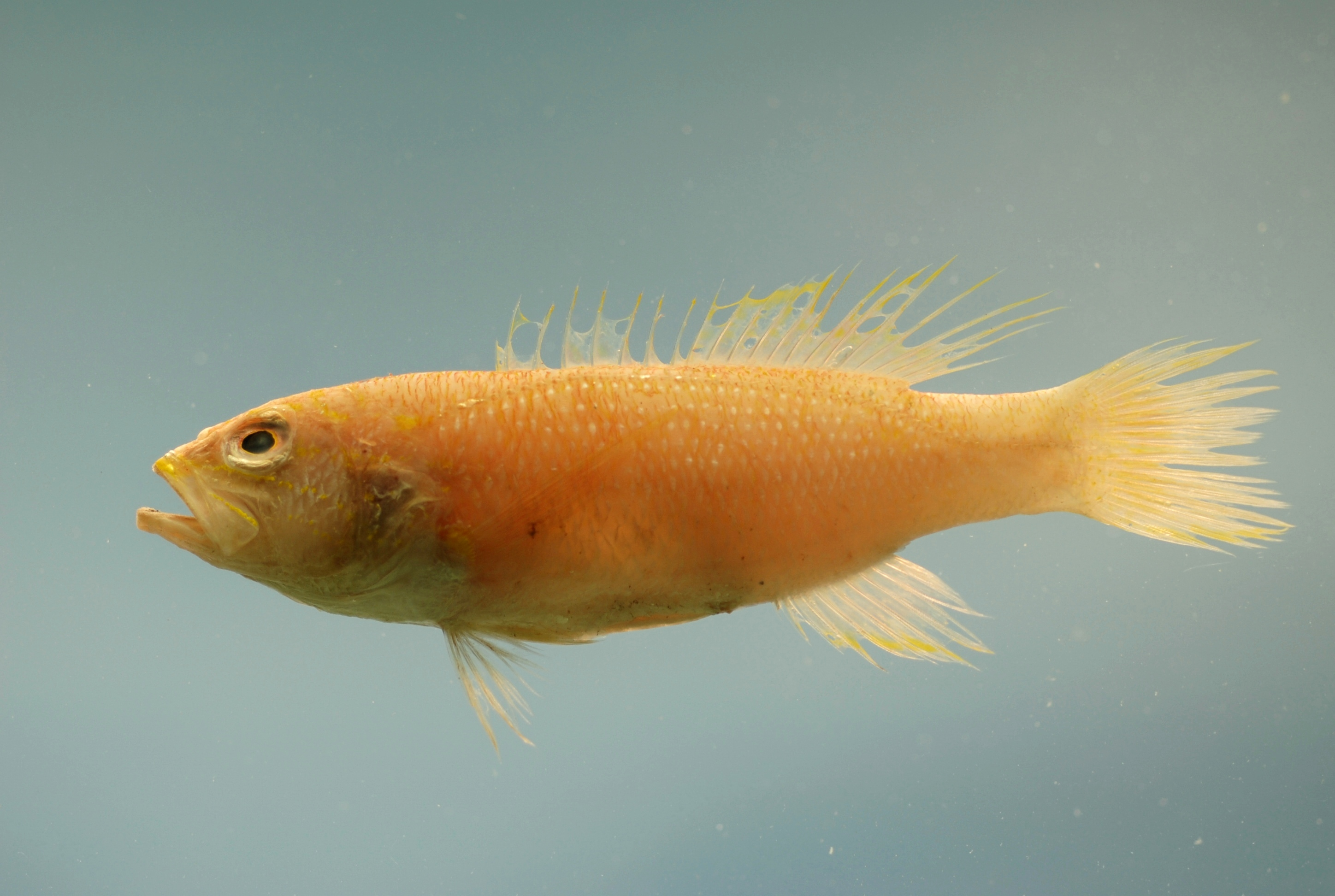
- Yellowtail bass (Bathyanthias mexicanus)

Scientific classification
- Kingdom: Animalia
- Phylum: Chordata
- Class: Actinopterygii
- Order: Perciformes
- Family: Liopropomatidae
- Subfamily: Liopropomatinae
- Genus: Bathyanthias; Günther, 1880

Type species
- Bathyanthias roseus Günther, 1880

Species
- See text

= Bathyanthias =

Genus of fishes

Bathyanthias is a genus of marine ray-finned fish, related to the groupers and included in the subfamily Epinephelinae, part of the family Serranidae, which also includes the anthias and sea basses. They are found in the Western Atlantic Ocean.

== Species ==
There are three species currently recognised in the genus Bathyanthias:

- Bathyanthias cubensis (Schultz, 1958)
- Bathyanthias mexicanus Schultz, 1958 (Yellowtail bass)
- Bathyanthias roseus Günther, 1880

A fourth valid species, Bathyanthias atlanticus, Schultz, 1958 is listed by some authorities but is not accepted by Fishbase.

== Taxonomy ==
Bathyanthias was created by the British-German zoologist Albert Günther (1830–1914) as a monotypic genus with B. roseus as its only species and with a type locality given as being off Pernambuco in Brazil and the type was collected on the Challenger Expedition of 1872–1876. Phylogenetic studies have suggested that the western Atlantic species within the tribe Liopropomini, including the genus Bathyanthias, form a monophyletic group with respect to the Indo-Pacific species currently classified as being within the genus Liopropoma. This further suggests that Bathyanthias is nested within Liopropoma, these studies indicate that more research is needed into the limits of the genus Liopropoma.
