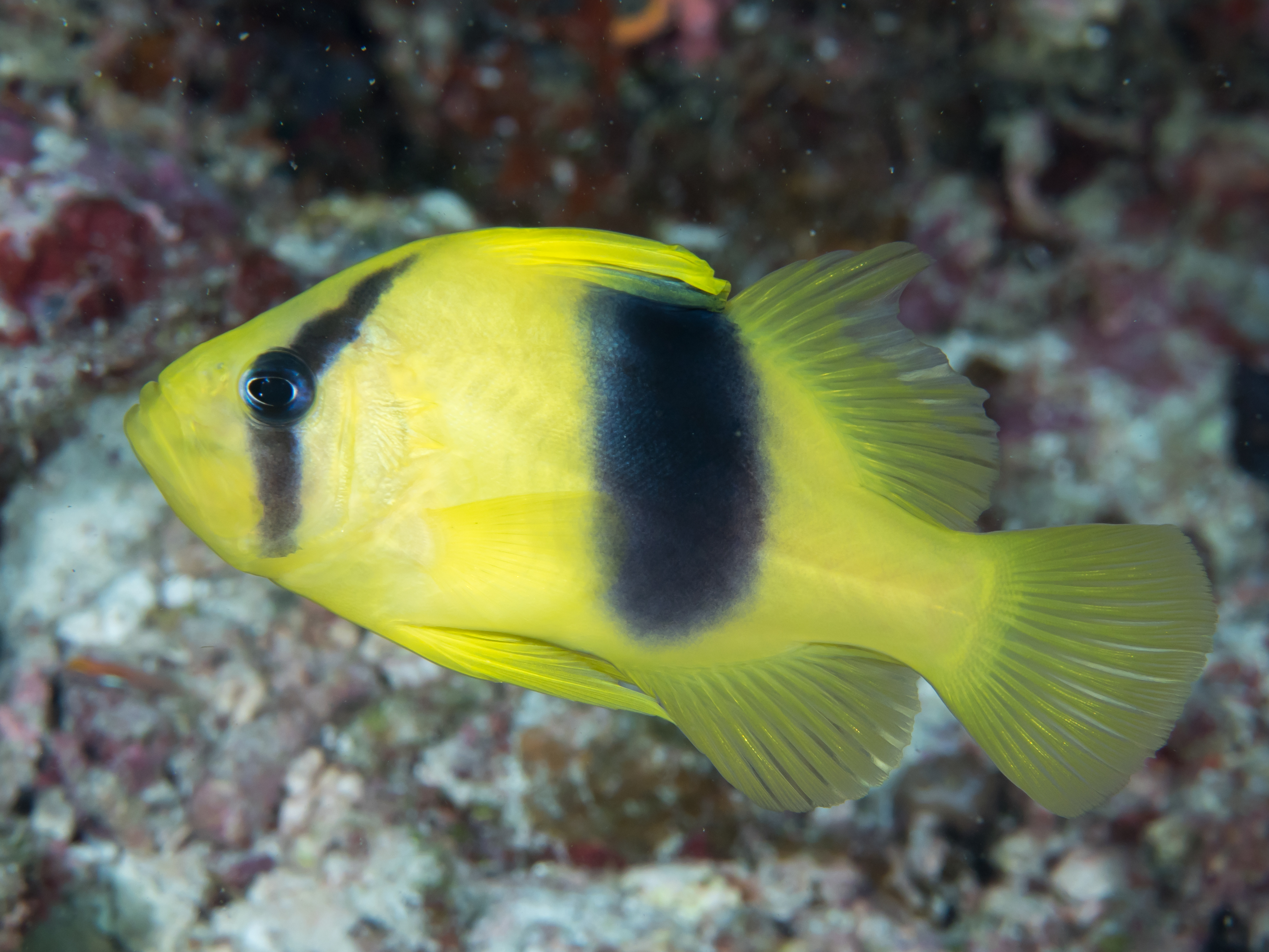
- Barred soapfish (Diploprion bifasciatum)
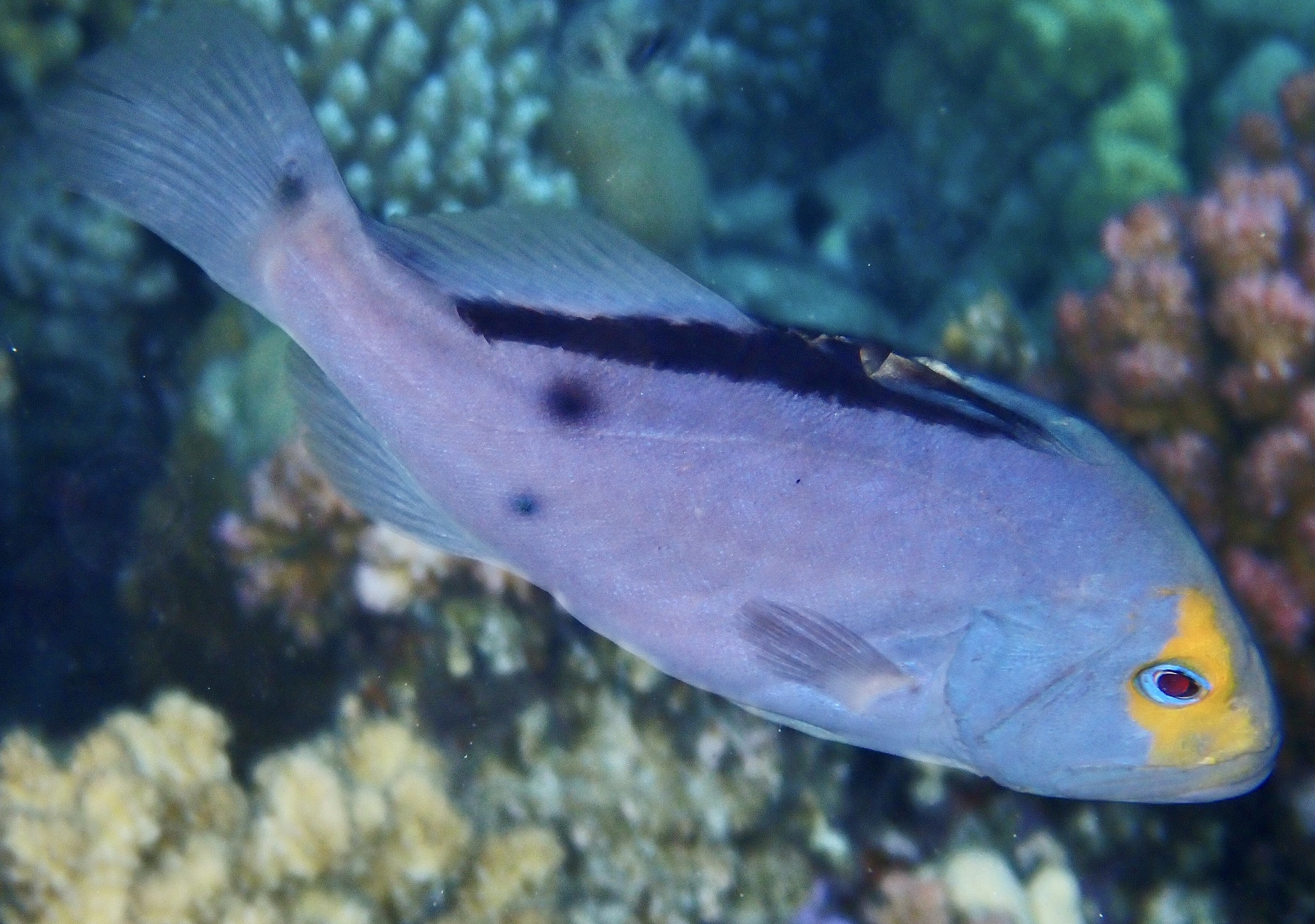
- Yellowfin soapfish (Diploprion drachi)

Scientific classification
- Kingdom: Animalia
- Phylum: Chordata
- Class: Actinopterygii
- Order: Perciformes
- Family: Liopropomatidae
- Subfamily: Diploprioninae
- Genus: Diploprion; Cuvier, 1828

Type species
- Diploprion bifasciatum Cuvier, 1828

Species
- see text

= Diploprion =

Genus of fishes

Diploprion is a genus of marine ray-finned fish, related to the groupers and included in the subfamily Epinephelinae, part of the family Serranidae, which also includes the anthias and sea basses. They are found in the Indo-Pacific region.

== Species ==
There are two species within the genus Diploprion:

- Diploprion bifasciatum Cuvier, 1828 (Barred soapfish)
- Diploprion drachi Roux-Estève, 1955 (Yellowfin soapfish)
