= Jacob Temminck =

Dutch businessman and specimen collector (1748–1822)

- Born: November 15, 1748; Amersfoort, Utrecht, Netherlands
- Died: August 15, 1822 (aged 73); Lausanne, Vaud, Switzerland
- Occupation: Treasurer
- Spouse: Alida van Stamhorst (m. 1774)
- Children: 2, including Coenraad

Jacob Temminck (November 1748 – August 15, 1822) was a treasurer in the Dutch East India Company and a collector of natural history objects, including a large number of bird specimens acquired through field collectors such as François Levaillant. His collection were passed on to his son, Coenraad Jacob Temminck (1778–1858), who was a noted ornithologist.
