= François Levaillant =

French explorer and ornithologist (1753–1824)

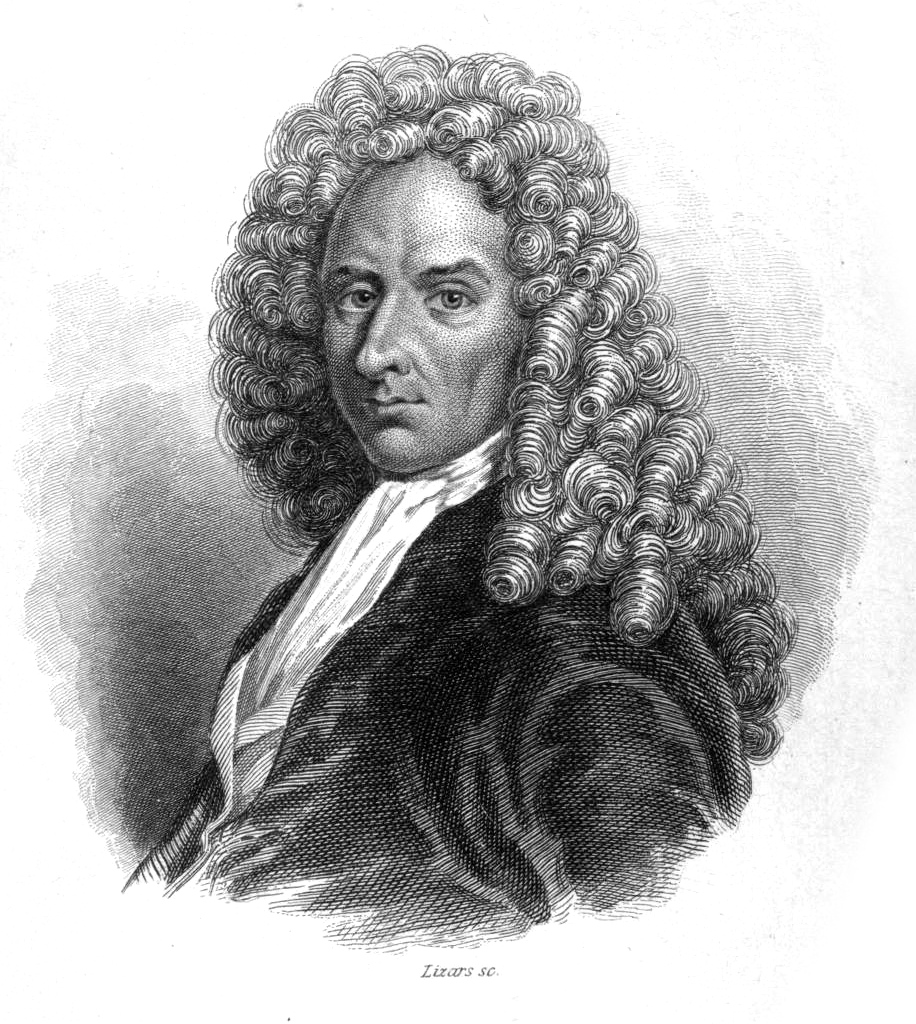
- François Levaillant
- Born: François Vaillant; 6 August 1753; Paramaribo, Suriname
- Died: 22 November 1824 (aged 71); La Noue, France
- Occupations: author, explorer, ornithologist
- Known for: Levaillant's woodpecker

François Levaillant (born Vaillant, later in life as Le Vaillant, "The Valiant") (6 August 1753 – 22 November 1824) was a French writer, explorer, naturalist, zoological collector, travel writer, and noted ornithologist. He described many new species of birds based on birds he collected in Africa and several birds are named after him. He was among the first to use colour plates for illustrating birds and opposed the use of binomial nomenclature introduced by Carl Linnaeus, preferring instead to use descriptive French names such as the bateleur (meaning "tumbler or tight-rope walker") for the distinctive African eagle.

== Life ==
François Vaillant was born in Paramaribo, the capital of Dutch Guiana (Surinam), the son of Nicolas François, a French lawyer from Metz who had fled there after eloping with his mother Catherine Joséphine and then took up a position as the French Consul. Growing up amid forests, François took an interest in the local fauna, collecting birds and insects. His family returned to France in 1763. In 1772, François joined the Berry cavalry regiment as a cadet officer in Metz but was eventually rejected as an officer because he was not tall enough. He married Suzanne de Noor in 1773. He worked with a local apothecary, Becoeur, who had developed an arsenic-based soap to preserve birds. In 1777, he moved to Paris and started a career as a trader in natural history specimens.

=== Cape travels ===
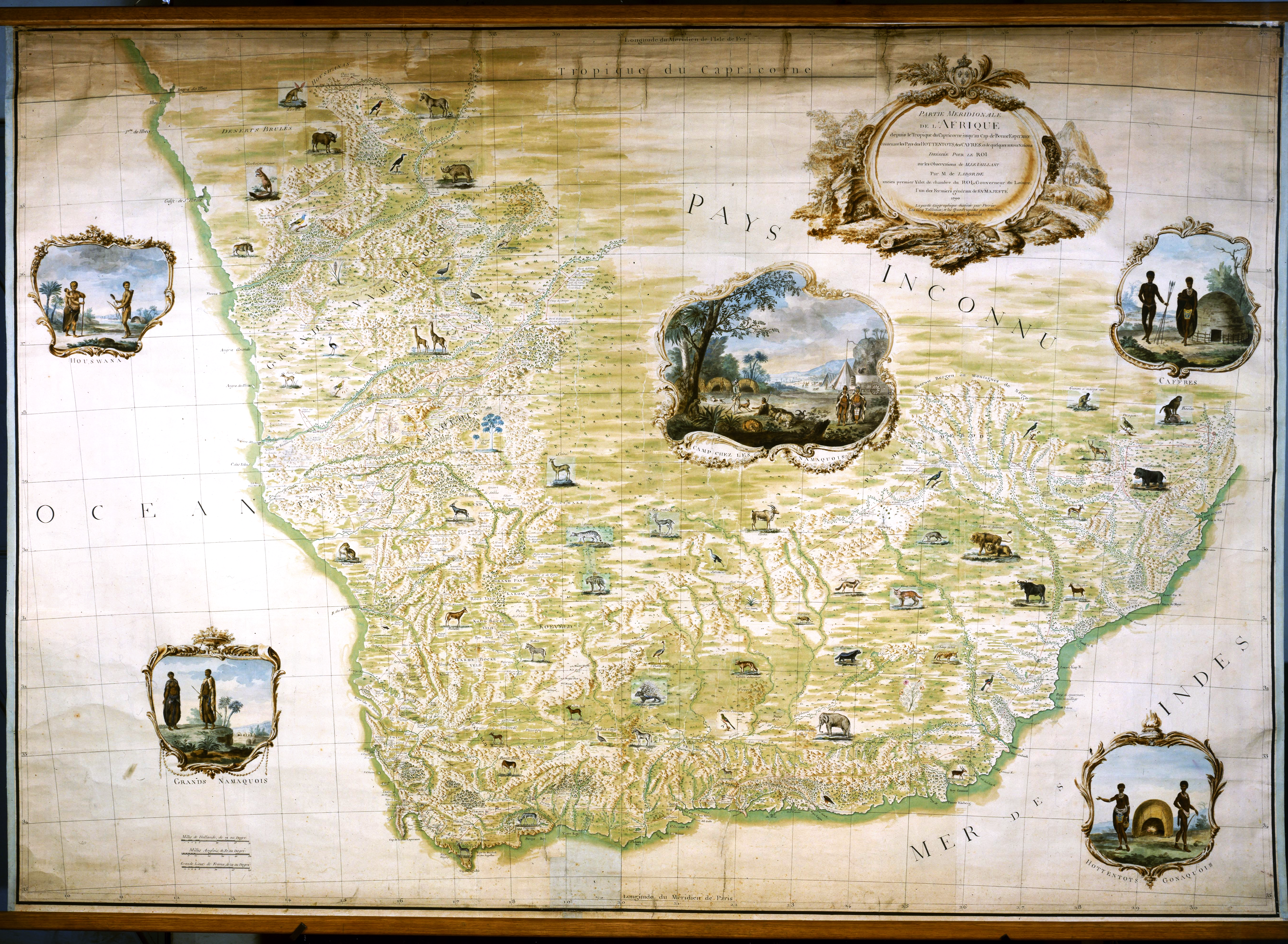
Map of southern Africa made for Louis XVI (1790)

He went to the Cape of Good Hope in 1780, at the age of 27, nominally as a gunner's mate for the Dutch East India Company, but almost certainly sponsored by the Treasurer-General, Jacob Temminck with the understanding that he would strengthen Temminck's collection. He decided to study the bird and animal life in their natural habitat. At that time, South Africa was a relatively unknown and exotic location and he collected specimens that would establish his reputation within the scientific community until July 1784 when he made his way back to Holland and France. He made three journeys, one around Cape Town and Saldanha Bay (April to August 1781), one eastwards from the Cape (December 1781 to May 1783) and the third to the Orange River and into Great Namaqualand (June 1783 to c. May 1784). Researchers have to some extent adjusted the dates supplied by Levaillant. During the first expedition his collection was on the vessel Middelburg, which was attacked and sunk by the English in Saldanha Bay. He did however manage to return with over 2000 specimens of birds, insects, mammals and plants. During this trip he changed his name to Le Vaillant.

An illustrative map of his travels was produced around 1790 for King Louis XVI. Measuring nine feet wide and six feet high, the map depicts the travels and the landscape met with. The cartographic elements of the map were made by Perrier with the insets of animals and landscapes by Van Leen. The birds were by Reinold. Sixty two pictures of fauna and flora were stuck onto the map. One of the animals depicted is the now extinct bluebuck.

=== Return to Europe ===
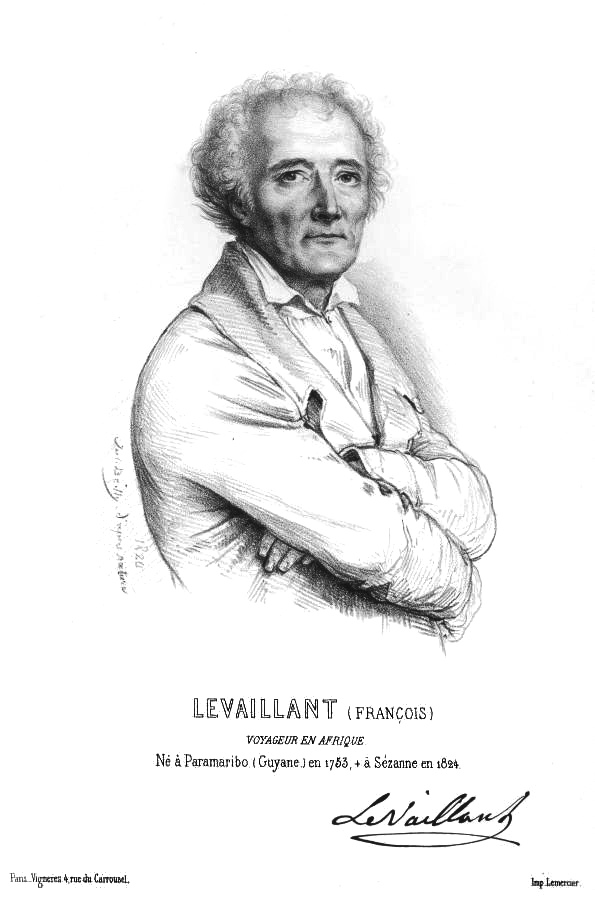
Portrait

On his return he published Voyage dans l'intérieur de l'Afrique (1790, 2 vols.), and Second voyage dans l'intérieur de l'Afrique (1796, 3 vols.), both of which were best sellers across Europe, translated into several languages. He had his drafts edited by Casimir Varon. It has been suggested that the success of the first book drove him to become more creative in the descriptions of the second voyage, many parts of which are considered to be fiction. He also published Histoire naturelle des oiseaux d'Afrique (1796–1808, 6 vols.) with drawings by Jacques Barraband, Histoire naturelle des oiseaux de paradis (1801–06), Histoire naturelle des cotingas et des todiers (1804) and Histoire naturelle des calaos (1804). He rarely sketched the birds in their natural environment but collected the skins which were stuffed and mounted on his return. More talented artists were then commissioned to illustrate the specimens for printing. Levaillant's illustrations often influenced scientific names given by, among others, Vieillot, Stephens and Wilkes.

He and De Noor divorced when divorce became legal during the French Revolution. By then he had already started a relationship with Pierrette Foyot, whom he married in Paris in June 1789. Pierrette was the daughter of judge Didier Francois Foyot of Sezanne. A dowry of 50,000 francs helped the couple and they had four children (including a son named Jean-Jacques Rousseau Levaillant who took an interest in ornithology). Levaillant claimed later to have been in prison during the time of the French Revolution but this was untrue—he was in fact close to many revolutionary figures and even applied for a post at the Natural History Museum through the Committee for Public Safety. Foyot's family gave them an estate at La Noue, near Sézanne and Levaillant moved between La Noue and Paris where he kept up a business as naturalist. After Foyot's death in May 1798, Levaillant lived with a younger woman, Rose Dubouchet, with whom he had four children. He died in La Noue in 1824. Four of his sons served in the French army, all earning the Légion d'honneur. By the time of his death, the family name had become Levaillant. Through Foyot's family, he was a grand uncle of the French poet Charles Baudelaire, who read Levaillant avidly as a young student.

== Specimens ==
Levaillant's fame as collector in his lifetime was based on bringing back the first giraffe skeleton to France. He also sold a significant collection to the Paris Natural History Museum, including in the sale not only the Bluebuck, a major collection of African birds, but insects and the secret of Becoeur's arsenical soap, which was widely used in taxidermy till the 1950s. Over 2,000 bird skins were sent to Jacob Temminck, who had financed the expedition, and these were later studied by his son Coenraad Jacob Temminck and included in the collection of the museum at Leiden. Other specimens were kept in the cabinet of Joan Raye, heer van Breukelerwaert (1737-1823). This collection was bought by the Rijksmuseum van Natuurlijke Historie in the late 1820s, which is now the Naturalis in Leiden.

== Traveller and ethnographer ==
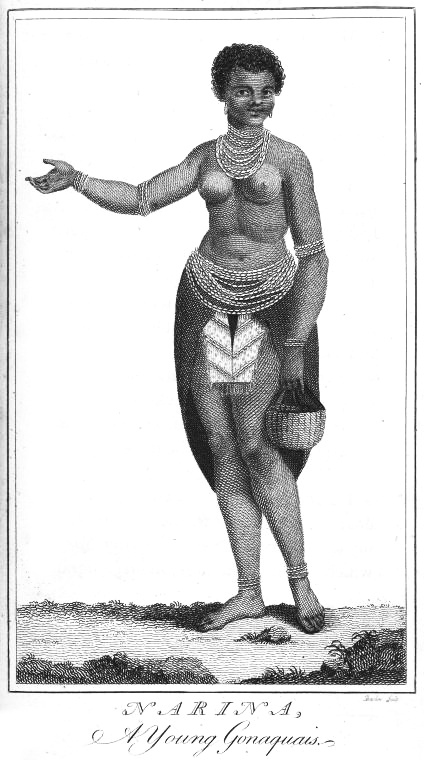
Narina

As a traveller in Africa, Levaillant tended to describe the African people with sympathy. He shared Rousseau's idea of the "Noble savage" and condemnation of civilization. He called his "Hottentot" companion Klaas his brother and his equal and was one of the first to describe a close relationship between Western explorer and an indigenous man. One of Levaillant's acquisitions on his travels was a chacma baboon that he called Kees. In his writings, he wrote about how he shared food and drink with Kees and considered him a simple soul who was more loyal than many humans. He described the beauty of Narina, a name that he used for a young Gonaqua woman, naming her after a flower. His portrayal of their flirtation influenced early South African novels before such relationships became less socially acceptable in the later colonial period. The portrayal of Narina was probably influenced by the images of exotic beauty from Tahiti in other travelers' accounts. She was a precursor to Sarah Baartman the Hottentot venus. He also perceived Dutch settlers in a negative way, attacking them for acting brutally against indigenous people. A brave experimenter, he allowed a Hottentot medicine man to diagnose him when he fell ill and wrote of the successful treatment and cure. By travelling around southern Africa, observing the wild and reflecting upon himself and mankind, it has been claimed that Le Vaillant was the pioneer of a genre of travel writing while also inventing the idea of a wildlife "safari" although he did not use that word of Arabian origin.

== Ornithology ==
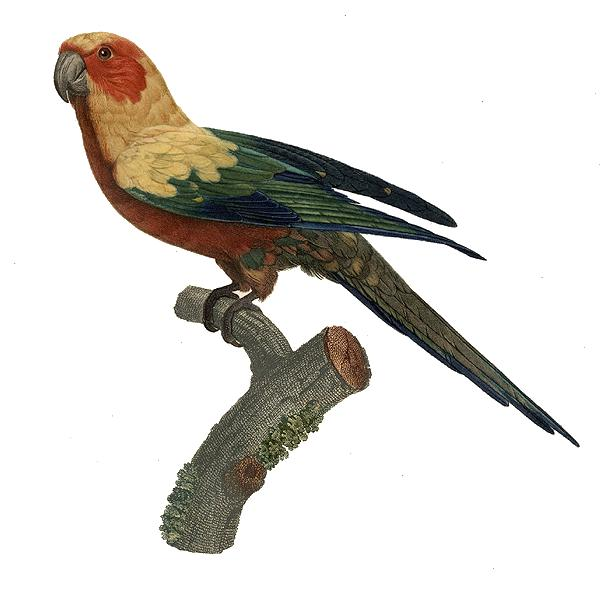
Illustration by Jacques Barraband for Le Vaillant's Histoire Naturelle des Perroquets

Le Vaillant was opposed to the systematic nomenclature introduced by Carl Linnaeus and only gave French names to the species that he discovered. Some of these are still in use as common names, such as bateleur, the French word for tumbler, for the way the bird playfully falls in flight. Other naturalists were left to assign binomial names to his new discoveries, some of these commemorate his name:

- Crested barbet (Trachyphonus vaillantii) Ranzani, 1821
- Levaillant's cisticola (Cisticola tinniens) (Lichtenstein, 1842)
- Levaillant's cuckoo (Clamator levaillantii) (Swainson, 1829)
- Levaillant's parrot also known as the Cape Parrot (Poicephalus robustus) (Gmelin, 1788)
- Levaillant's tchagra (Tchagra tchagra) (Vieillot, 1816)
- Levaillant's woodpecker (Picus vaillantii) Malherbe, 1847

Le Vaillant was among the first to consider the use of coloured plates of birds in his descriptions. He mounted his bird specimens, preserved with arsenic soap, in lifelike positions and the illustrators showed them in near realistic poses. He ensured that the fiscal shrike was shown along with an insect impaled on thorn. His descriptions of bird behaviour were also considered to be pioneering. He called the African fish eagle Vocifer for its distinctive and loud yelping calls made while throwing back its head. He was also the first to use musical annotation to describe bird song. A very careful observer of behaviour, he was among the first to notice that the rosy-faced lovebird (Agapornis roseicollis) nested within the nests of the sociable weaver (Philetairus socius). It has been suggested that he may well have been a major influence in the style and art of John James Audubon.

An analysis of Le Vaillant's collections made by Carl Sundevall in 1857 identified ten birds that could not be assigned definitely to any species, ten that were fabricated from multiple species and fifty species that could not have come from the Cape region as claimed.

== Legacy ==
The South American fish Brachyplatystoma vaillantii is named after him.

== Works ==
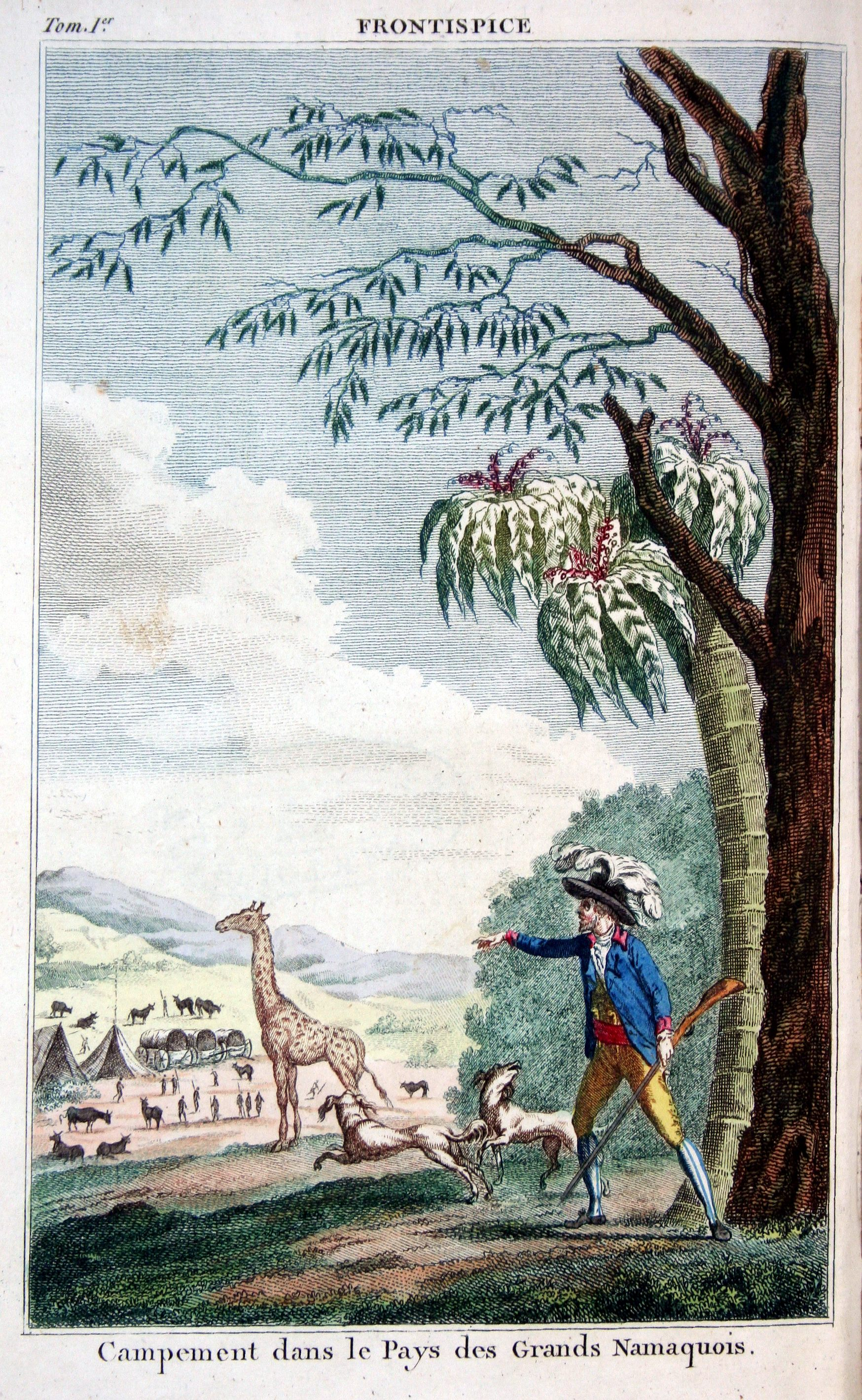
Frontispiece from Voyage dans l'intérieur de l'Afrique, depicting Levaillant in plumed hat

- Voyage de M. Le Vaillant dans l'Intérieur de l'Afrique par Le Cap de Bonne Espérance, dans Les années 1783, 84 & 85. Paris: Leroy. 1790. in two volumes.
- Second voyage dans l'intérieur de l'Afrique, par le Cap de Bonne-Espérance, dans les annees 1783, 84 et 85. Paris: H.J. Jansen et Comp. 1795. vol.1, vol. 2, vol 3
- Histoire naturelle d'une partie d'oiseaux nouveaux et rares de l'Amérique et des Indes : ouvrage destiné par l'auteur à faire partie de son ornithologie d'Afrique. Paris. 1801.
- Histoire naturelle des perroquets. Paris: Levrault, Schoell & Cie. 1801–1805. Vol 1 Vol 2
- Histoire naturelle des oiseaux de paradis et des rolliers, suivie de celles des toucans et des barbus. Paris: Denné le jeune & Perlet. 1801–1806. doi:10.5962/bhl.title.61652. in two volumes.
- Histoire naturelle des promérops et des guêpiers (et des couroucous et touracos, faisant suite à celle des oiseaux de paradis. Paris: Levrault. 1806–1818. in three volumes.
- Histoire Naturelle des Oiseaux d'Afrique. Paris: Delachaussee. 1805–1808. doi:10.5962/bhl.title.63636. in six volumes.
- Partie Méridionale de l'Afrique depuis le Tropique du Capricorne jusqu'au Cap de Bonne Espérance contenant les Pays des Hottentots, des Cafres et de quelques autres Nations / dressée pour le Roi sur les observations de M. Le Vaillant par M. de Laborde, ancien premier valet de chambre du Roi, gouverneur du Louvre, l'un des Fermiers généraux de Sa Majesté. (Map illustrating the travels of Le Vaillant)]

in English translation:

- Travels into the interior parts of Africa, by way of the Cape of Good Hope; in the years 1780, 1781 82, 83, 84, and 85. London. 1796.
- New travels into the interior parts of Africa, by way of the Cape of Good Hope, in the years 1783, 84 and 85. London. 1796. Volume 1 Volume 2 Volume 3
