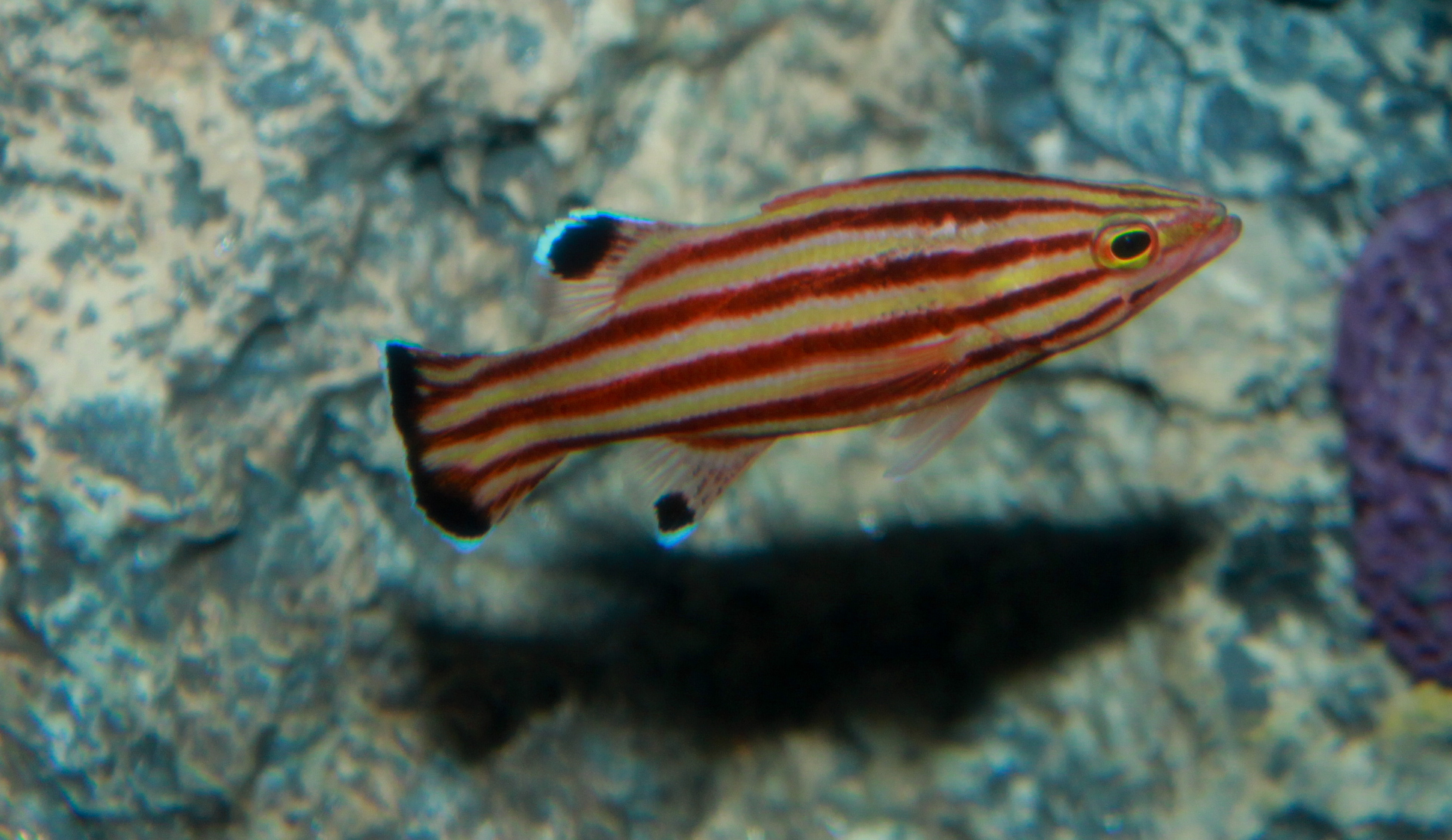

Conservation status
- Least Concern (IUCN 3.1)

Scientific classification
- Kingdom: Animalia
- Phylum: Chordata
- Class: Actinopterygii
- Order: Perciformes
- Family: Liopropomatidae
- Genus: Liopropoma
- Species: L. rubre

Binomial name
- Liopropoma rubre Poey, 1861

= Liopropoma rubre =

Species of fish

Liopropoma rubre, the peppermint bass or swissguard basslet, is a species of marine ray-finned fish, related to the groupers and classified within the subfamily Epinephelinae of the family Serranidae. It is found in the western Atlantic Ocean. This species is utilised in the aquarium trade.

== Description ==
Liopropoma rubre has a moderately elongated and compressed body with a pointed head, the dorsal profile of the head being almost horizontal, and a relatively large, oblique mouth. The posterior margin of the preoperculum has serrations while the gill cover has three flattened spines on its rear edge. The caudal fin is slightly concave and the body is covered in small, rough scales. The dorsal fin has 6-7 spines and 12 soft rays. The overall colour of the body is yellow-orange marked with 5 wide black lines alongside which have red margins. There is also a large black spot on posterior dorsal fin and another on the anal fin while the caudal fin has 2 black spots which are joined by a black bar. The spots on the dorsal and caudal fins are edged with pale blue. This species attains a maximum total length of 10 centimetres (3.9 in).

== Distribution ==
Liopropoma rubre is found in the western Atlantic from Bermuda and the Bahamas, into the Gulf of Mexico where it is found from the Florida Keys, the Flower Garden Banks, and on the Campeche Bank off Mexico, southwards throughout the Caribbean Sea.

== Habitat and biology ==
Liopropoma rubre is a solitary species which occurs in coral reefs, where it lives on deep crevices and caves, at depths of 3 to 46 metres (9.8 to 150.9 ft). Although it is a common species it is secretive and is therefore rarely observed. It is a carnivorous species which feeds on crustaceans and other fishes. There is some evidence that it is a protogynous hermaphrodite.

== Taxonomy ==
Liopropoma rubre was first formally described in 1861 by the Cuban zoologist Felipe Poey (1799-1891) with the type locality given as Cuba.

== Utilisation ==
Liopropoma rubre is available in the aquarium trade and has been bred in captivity.
