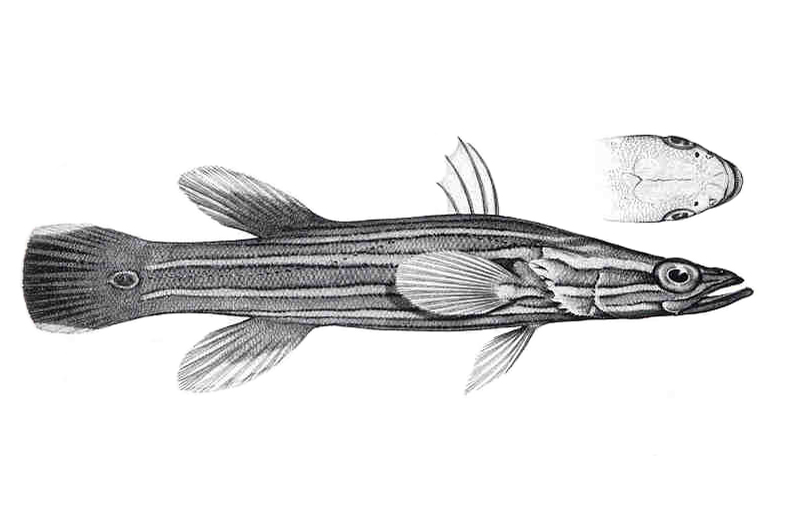

Conservation status
- Least Concern (IUCN 3.1)

Scientific classification
- Kingdom: Animalia
- Phylum: Chordata
- Class: Actinopterygii
- Order: Perciformes
- Family: Liopropomatidae
- Subfamily: Liopropomatinae
- Genus: Rainfordia; McCulloch, 1923
- Species: R. opercularis

Binomial name
- Rainfordia opercularis McCulloch, 1923
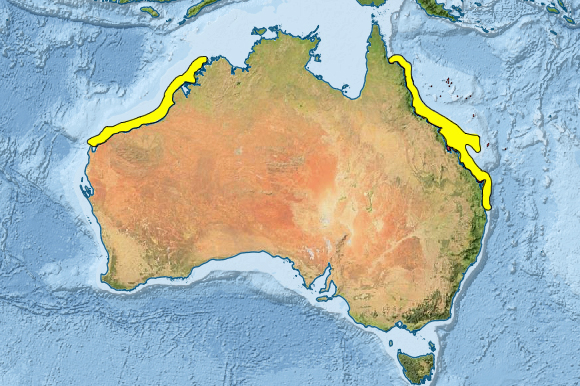
- Range of Rainfordia

= Rainfordia =

Species of fish

The rainfordia (Rainfordia opercularis), also known as the flathead perch or Rainford's perch, is a species of marine ray-finned fish, related to the groupers and classified within the subfamily Epinephelinae of the family Serranidae. It is found in the eastern Indian Ocean and in the Western Pacific Ocean. It is the only species in its monotypic genus.

== Description ==
The rainfordia has an overall dark orange colour broken by six black-margined lilac stripes along each flank, the background orange colour is darkest on the centre of the flanks, fading to yellow on the back and belly. The spines in the dorsal fin are yellowish with a transparent membrane between them. The second dorsal fin has a dark base and a wide-angled yellow band just short of its edge which runs from the first soft ray to the tip of the seventh soft ray. The edge itself is whitish in colour and the remaining soft rays are reddish-brown. The anal fin shows a similar pattern to the dorsal fin. The pectoral fins and the pelvic fin are pinkish yellow in colour. There is a black, blue-edged eyespot at the base of the tail. The caudal fin is brown with its outer margin having a white edge at its corners. This species is also characterised by the forward placement of its eyes and its wide mouth. It attains a maximum recorded total length of 15 centimetres (5.9 in).

== Distribution ==
The rainfordia is found in the Indian Ocean off Western Australia from Kendrew Island in the Dampier Archipelago to Kimberley and in eastern Australia from the northern Great Barrier Reef and reefs in the Coral Sea, as far south as Moreton Bay in Queensland. It was thought to be endemic to Australia but in 2019 it was recorded in the Raja Ampat Islands of West Papua in Indonesia.

== Habitat and biology ==
The rainfordia occurs in inshore waters where it is found in caves and crevices in coral reefs and is generally solitary.

== Taxonomy ==
The rainfordia was first described in 1923 by the Australian ichthyologist Allan Riverstone McCulloch (1885–1925) with the type locality given as the Middle Island, Edgecumbe Bay, Whitsunday Passage, Queensland. It is the only species in the genus Rainfordia which McCulloch named after the collector the type, Mr H.L. Rainford. McCulloch originally placed it as being related to the genus Grammistes but in its own monotypic family, the Rainfordidae, but it is now placed within the tribe Liopropomini.

== Utilisation ==
The rainfordia is a rare species in the wild and in captivity and fetches high prices in the aquarium trade but they have been successfully bred in captivity.
