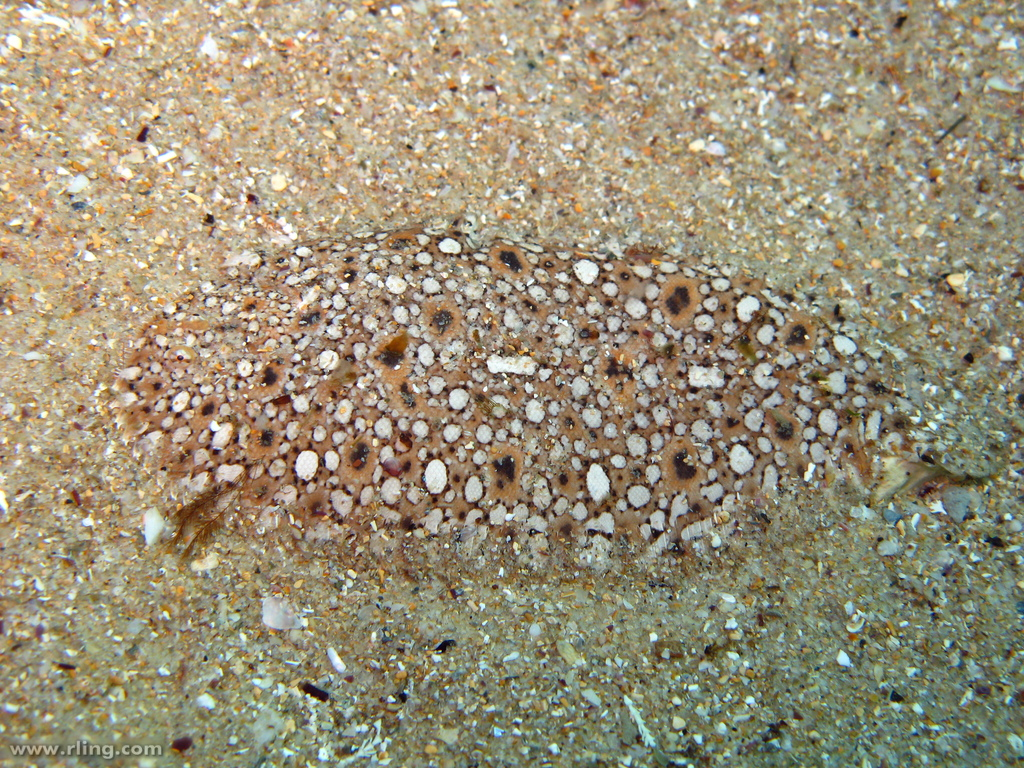
- Southern Peacock Sole (P. hedleyi)
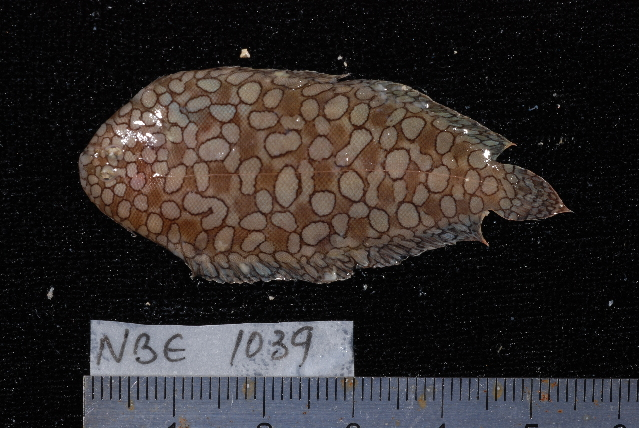
- Persian Carpet Sole (P. morrowi)

Scientific classification
- Kingdom: Animalia
- Phylum: Chordata
- Class: Actinopterygii
- Division: Teleostei
- Order: Carangiformes
- Suborder: Pleuronectoidei
- Family: Soleidae
- Genus: Pardachirus; Günther, 1862

Type species
- Achirus marmoratus Lacépède, 1802

Synonyms
- Normanetta Whitley, 1931

= Pardachirus =

Genus of fishes

Pardachirus is a genus of soles mainly native to coastal water in the Indo-Pacific. A single species, P. poropterus is restricted to estuaries and lower sections of freshwater streams. At least some species in the genus are toxic.

== Species ==
There are currently six recognized species in this genus:

- Pardachirus balius J. E. Randall & Mee, 1994 (Piebald sole)
- Pardachirus hedleyi J. D. Ogilby, 1916 (Southern peacock sole)
- Pardachirus marmoratus (Lacépède, 1802) (Finless sole)
- Pardachirus morrowi (Chabanaud, 1954) (Persian carpet sole)
- Pardachirus pavoninus (Lacépède, 1802) (Peacock sole)
- Pardachirus poropterus (Bleeker, 1851) (Estuary sole)
