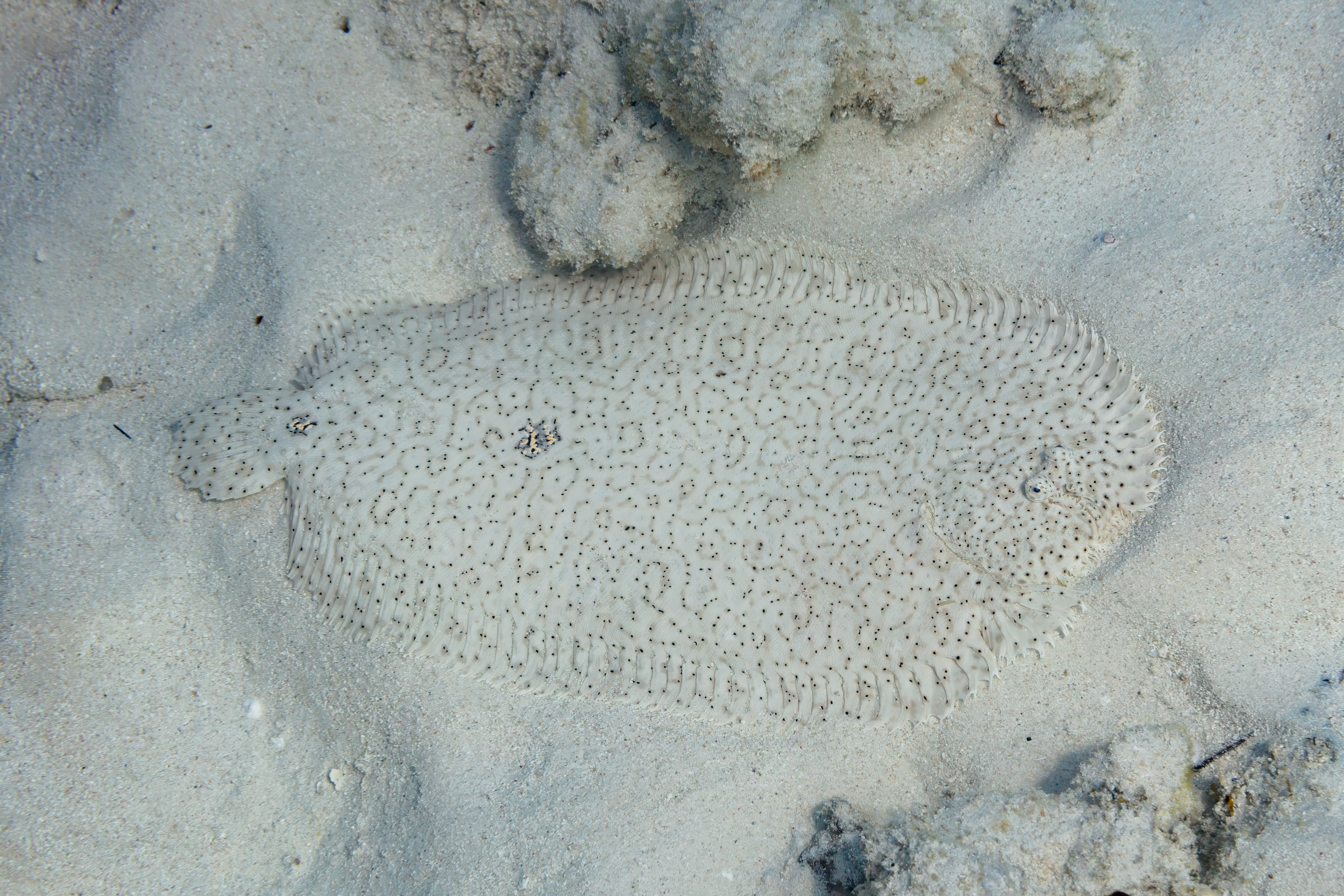

Conservation status
- Least Concern (IUCN 3.1)

Scientific classification
- Kingdom: Animalia
- Phylum: Chordata
- Class: Actinopterygii
- Order: Carangiformes
- Suborder: Pleuronectoidei
- Family: Soleidae
- Genus: Pardachirus
- Species: P. marmoratus

Binomial name
- Pardachirus marmoratus (Lacépède, 1802)

Synonyms
- Achirus marmoratus Lacepède, 1802; Achirus barbatus Lacepède, 1802; Achirus punctatus Desjardins, 1837

= Pardachirus marmoratus =

Finless sole

Species of fish

Pardachirus marmoratus, the finless sole, speckled sole, Red Sea Moses sole, or Moses sole, is a species of flatfish native to the western Indian Ocean.

== Description ==
The juvenile finless sole is bilaterally symmetrical, with one eye on each side; as they mature their left eye migrates to the right side of their head, and their body takes on a highly compressed shape, convex on the eyed side and flat on the blind side. The rounded caudal fin is not attached to either the dorsal or cloacal fin. It is variable in colour, frequently whitish, pale brown to pale grey with a scattering of irregular dark brown ring shape markings and many dark brown spots on the head, body, and fins. Along the lateral line, there are normally two brown dots containing yellow flecks. Pardachirus marmoratus's colour provides camouflage when it rests on sandy or pebbled seafloors.

== Distribution and habitat ==
This species occurs in the western Indian Ocean from the Red Sea to Sri Lanka and along the east coast of Africa to Durban. It is found in shallow, coastal waters where the seabed consists of sand or mud, often near coral reefs, and they feed mainly on benthic invertebrates. It is caught for consumption, despite the poison it exudes and is marketed fresh. They often spend the day buried in the sand with only its eyes and nostrils visible.

== Toxicity ==
The finless sole secretes a milky ichthyotoxin from the base of its dorsal and cloacal fins. This secretion contains pardaxin, a lipophillic peptide that causes severe plasma membrane disruption resulting in cell leakage. The pardaxin-containing secretion is used as a defensive mechanism against predators including sharks. Pardaxin is irritating to predator fish, particularly affecting the sensitive gills. Eugenie Clark conducted much of the early work on the species.

There is much biotechnological interest in pardaxin: early interest focused on potential shark repellent applications while newer research focuses on antimicrobial and neurotoxic potential of pardaxin and its analogues. One toxin produced, pardaxin-1, does have unusual shark repellent and surfactant properties. It created voltage-dependent, ion-permeable channels in membranes and at high concentration it causes lysis in cell membranes. This toxin has been demonstrated to be 5–10 times more toxic, cytolytic and active in the formation of pores in cell membranes than the other toxin exuded, pardaxin-2.

Mimic octopuses have been known to mimic the finless sole by adapting its shape, colour and texture; these octopuses can also mimic venomous sea snakes and fish.
