= Coenraad Jacob Temminck =

Dutch zoologist (1778–1858)

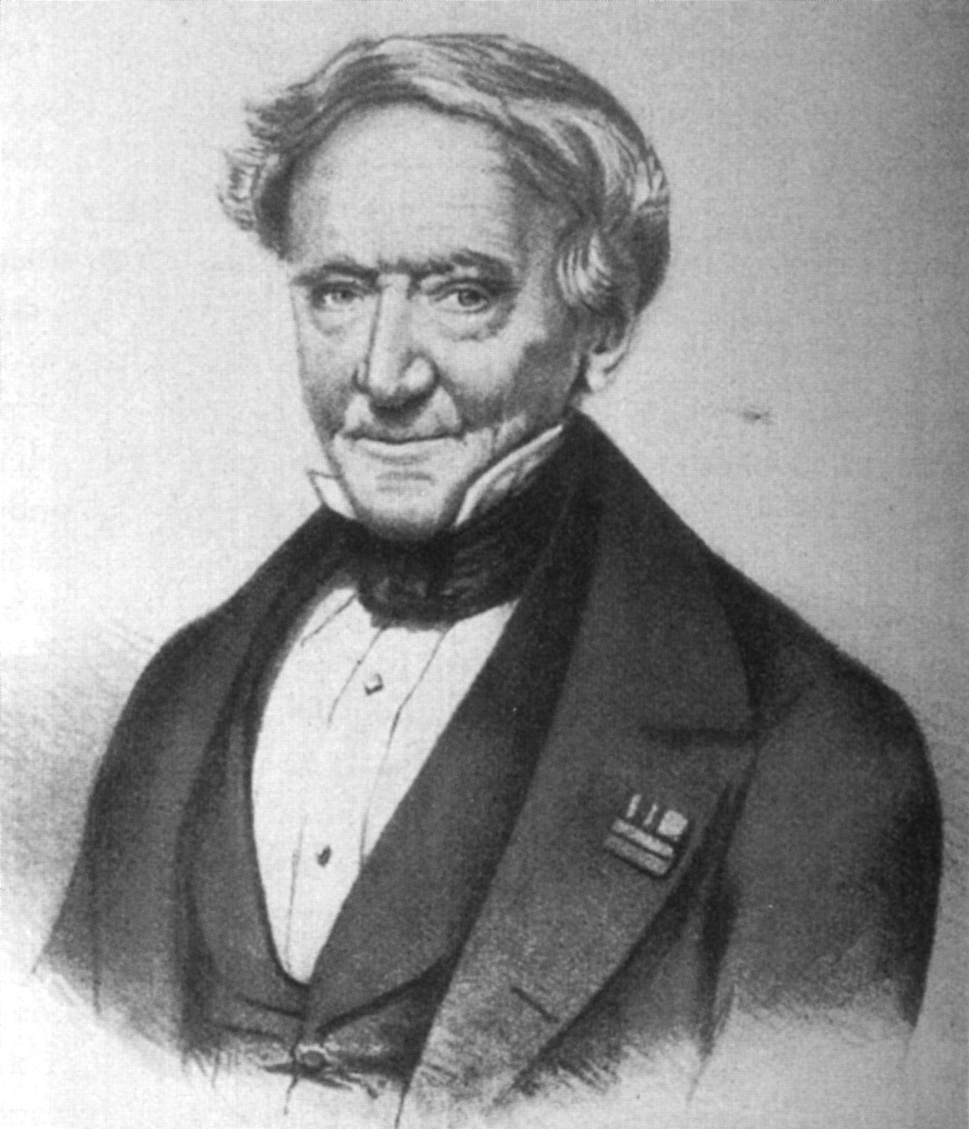
- Born: 31 March 1778; Amsterdam, Dutch Republic
- Died: 30 January 1858 (aged 79); Leiden, Netherlands
- Known for: Manuel d'ornithologie, ou Tableau systématique des oiseaux qui se trouvent en Europe (1815)
- Father: Jacob Temminck
- Scientific career
- Fields: Zoology
- Workplaces: National Natural History Museum at Leiden
- Academic advisors: François Levaillant
- Notable students: Hermann Schlegel
- Author abbrev. (zoology): Temminck

Coenraad Jacob Temminck (Dutch pronunciation: [ˈkunraː ˈtɕaːkɔp ˈtɛmɪŋk]; (Note: The first names in isolation are pronounced [ˈkunraːt] and [ˈjaːkɔp].) 31 March 1778 – 30 January 1858) was a Dutch patrician, zoologist and museum director.

== Biography ==
Coenraad Jacob Temminck was born on 31 March 1778 in Amsterdam in the Dutch Republic. From his father, Jacob Temminck, who was treasurer of the Dutch East India Company with links to numerous travellers and collectors, he inherited a large collection of bird specimens. His father was a good friend of Francois Levaillant who also guided Coenraad.

Temminck's Manuel d'ornithologie, ou Tableau systématique des oiseaux qui se trouvent en Europe (1815) was the standard work on European birds for many years. He was also the author of Histoire naturelle générale des Pigeons et des Gallinacées (1813–1817), illustrated by Pauline Knip. He wrote Nouveau Recueil de Planches coloriées d'Oiseaux (1820–1839), and contributed to the mammalian sections of Philipp Franz von Siebold's Fauna japonica (1844–1850).

Temminck was the first director of the National Museum of Natural History in Leiden, from 1820 until his death in 1858. In 1824, he was elected to the American Philosophical Society. In 1831, he was elected a foreign member of the Royal Swedish Academy of Sciences. In 1836 he became member of the Royal Institute, predecessor of the Royal Netherlands Academy of Arts and Sciences.

== Works ==
Temminck, in collaboration with Heinrich Kuhl, was the author of descriptions of parrots, including the rosella Platycercus icterotis. A tailless mutant of a junglefowl Gallus lafayettii was described in 1807 by Temminck, which in 1868 the English naturalist Charles Darwin incorrectly denied existed. Another junglefowl, described in 1813 by Temminck as Gallus giganteus was, he believed, one of six wild ancestral species of domestic fowl; Darwin, however, demonstrated that the latter has a single (monophyletic) origin.

== Species named after Temminck ==
A large number of animals were named after Temminck in the 19th century. Among those still in use are:

- Fish
  - Ancistrus temminckii (an armoured suckermouth catfish)
  - Dark chub Zacco temminckii (a carp)
  - Nipponocypris temminckii (a cyprinid)
  - Samoan silverside Hypoatherina temminckii (Bleeker 1854)
  - Longsnout pipefish Syngnathus temminckii Kaup, 1856
  - Oilfish Rovetus temminckii (synonym)
  - Goldribbon soapfish Aulacocephalus temminckii
  - Ditrema temminckii Bleeker 1853 (a surfperch)
  - Thread-fin fairy-wrasse Cirrhilabrus temminckii
  - Kissing gourami Helostoma temminckii Cuvier 1829
  - Broadfin shark Lamiopsis temminckii (J. P. Müller & Henle 1839)
  - Dictyosoma temminckii Bleeker 1853
  - Aulacocephalus temminckii Bleeker 1855
- Reptiles:
  - Alligator snapping turtle Macrochelys temminckii
  - Tytthoscincus temmincki (a skink)
- Birds:
  - Temminck's sunbird Aethopyga temminckii
  - Temminck's stint Calidris temminckii
  - Purple-winged roller Coracias temminckii
  - Cerulean cuckooshrike Coracina temminckii
  - Temminck's courser Cursorius temminckii
  - Temminck's lark Eremophila bilopha
  - Malaysian eared nightjar Lyncornis temminckii
  - Australian logrunner Orthonyx temminckii
  - Temminck's babbler Pellorneum pyrrhogenys
  - Temminck's cormorant Phalacrocorax capillatus
  - Ochre-collared piculet Picumnus temminckii
  - Temminck's fruit dove Ptilinopus porphyreus
  - Temminck's hornbill Rhabdotorrhinus exarhatus
  - Temminck's seedeater Sporophila falcirostris
  - Temminck's tragopan Tragopan temminckii
  - Sulawesi pygmy woodpecker Yungipicus temminckii
  - Javan sunbird subspecies Aethopyga mystacalis temminckii
  - Black sparrowhawk subspecies Astur melanoleucus temminckii
  - Blue whistling thrush subspecies Myophonus caeruleus temminckii
  - Bekisar hybrid "Gallus temminckii" (G. varius × G. gallus)
- Mammals:
  - Temminck's mole Mogera wogura
  - Temminck's flying fox Pteropus temminckii
  - Temminck's tailless fruit bat Megaerops ecaudatus
  - Dwarf dog-faced bat Molossops temminckii
  - Temminck's trident bat Aselliscus tricuspidatus
  - Temminck's mysterious bat Nycticeius aenobarbus
  - Temminck's pangolin Smutsia temminckii
  - Temminck's golden cat Catopuma temminckii
  - Southern right whale Hunterus temminckii (a synonym)
  - Temminck's mouse Mus musculoides
  - Temminck's striped mouse Hybomys trivirgatus
  - Temminck's giant squirrel Epixerus ebii
  - Temminck's flying squirrel Petinomys setosus
  - Temminck's red colobus Pilocolobus badius temminckii (subspecies)

== Bibliography ==
- Catalogue systématique du cabinet d’ornithologie et de la collection de quadrumanes, avec une courte description des oiseaux non-décrits. Sepps, Amsterdam 1807.
- Histoire naturelle générale des pigeons et des gallinacés. Sepps, Amsterdam 1808–15.
- Manuel d'ornithologie ou Tableau systématique des oiseaux qui se trouvent en Europe. Sepps & Dufour, Amsterdam, Paris 1815–40.
- Observations sur la classification méthodique des oiseaux et remarques sur l'analyse d'une nouvelle ornithologie élémentaire. Dufour, Amsterdam, Paris 1817.
- Nouveau recueil de planches coloriées d'oiseaux, pour servir de suite et de complément aux planches enluminées de Buffon. Dufour & d'Ocagne, Paris 1821.
- Atlas des oiseaux d'Europe, pour servir de complément au Manuel d'ornithologie de M. Temminck. Belin, Paris 1826–42.
- Monographies de mammalogie. Dufour & d'Ocagne, Paris, Leiden 1827–41.
- Nouveau recueil de planches coloriées d'oiseaux. Levrault, Paris 1838.
- Iconographie ornithologique ou nouveau recueil général de planches peintes d'oiseaux Paris, 1845–1849.
- Coup-d'oeil général sur les possessions néerlandaises dans l'Inde archipélagique. Arnz, Leiden 1846–49.
- Esquisses zoologiques sur la côte de Guiné ... le partie, les mammifères. Brill, Leiden 1853.
- Las Posesiones holandesas en el Archipiélago de la India. Manila 1855.

== Taxon described by him ==
- See Category:Taxa named by Coenraad Jacob Temminck
