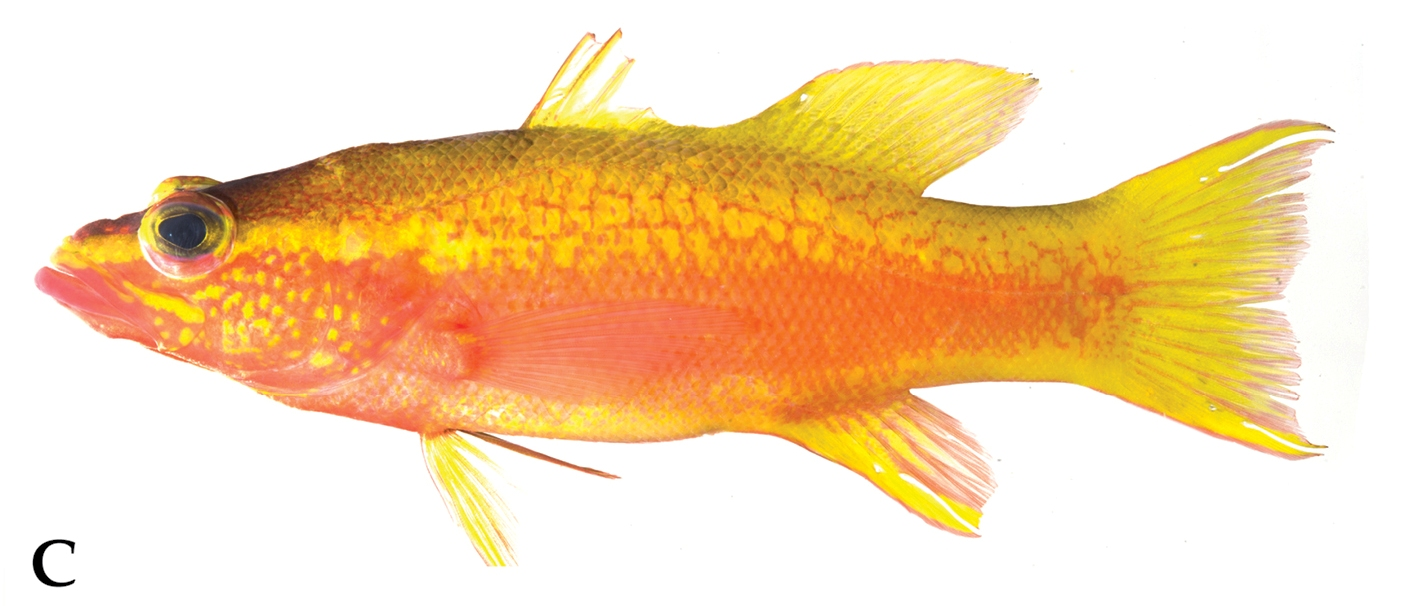
- Liopropoma aberrans

Scientific classification
- Kingdom: Animalia
- Phylum: Chordata
- Class: Actinopterygii
- Order: Perciformes
- Family: Liopropomatidae
- Subfamily: Liopropomatinae
- Genus: Liopropoma; T. N. Gill, 1861

Type species
- Perca aberrans Poey, 1860

Synonyms
- Chorististium Gill, 1862; Flagelloserranus Kotthaus, 1970; Labracopsis Steindachner & Döderlein, 1883; Pikea Steindachner, 1875; Ypsigramma Schultz, 1953

= Liopropoma =

Genus of fishes

Liopropoma is a genus of marine ray-finned fish in the family Liopropomatidae. They are sometimes seen in the marine aquarium trade.

== Species ==
There are currently 32 recognized species of this genus:

- Liopropoma aberrans Poey, 1860
- Liopropoma africanum J. L. B. Smith, 1954 (African basslet)
- Liopropoma aragai J. E. Randall & L. R. Taylor, 1988
- Liopropoma aurora D. S. Jordan & Evermann, 1903 (Yellowmargin basslet)
- Liopropoma carmabi J. E. Randall, 1963 (Candy basslet)
- Liopropoma collettei J. E. Randall & L. R. Taylor, 1988 (Collette's basslet)
- Liopropoma danae Kotthaus, 1970
- Liopropoma dorsoluteum Kon, Yoshino & Sakurai, 1999
- Liopropoma emanueli Wirtz & Schliewen, 2012 (Cape Verdes basslet)
- Liopropoma erythraeum J. E. Randall & L. R. Taylor, 1988
- Liopropoma eukrines Starck & Courtenay, 1962 (Wrasse bass)
- Liopropoma fasciatum W. A. Bussing, 1980 (Wrasse ass bass)
- Liopropoma flavidum J. E. Randall & L. R. Taylor, 1988
- Liopropoma incandescens Pinheiro, Shepherd, Greene & Rocha, 2019
- Liopropoma incomptum J. E. Randall & L. R. Taylor, 1988 (Plain basslet)
- Liopropoma japonicum Döderlein (de), 1883
- Liopropoma latifasciatum S. Tanaka (I), 1922 (Blackstripe basslet)
- Liopropoma lemniscatum J. E. Randall & L. R. Taylor, 1988 (Ribbon basslet)
- Liopropoma longilepis Garman, 1899 (Scalyfin basslet)
- Liopropoma lunulatum Guichenot, 1863
- Liopropoma maculatum Döderlein (de), 1883
- Liopropoma mitratum Lubbock & J. E. Randall, 1978 (Pinstriped basslet)
- Liopropoma mowbrayi Woods & Kanazawa, 1951 (Cave bass)
- Liopropoma multilineatum J. E. Randall & L. R. Taylor, 1988 (Manyline perch)
- Liopropoma olneyi Baldwin & G. D. Johnson, 2014 (Yellow-spotted golden bass)
- Liopropoma pallidum Fowler, 1938 (Pallid basslet)
- Liopropoma randalli Akhilesh, Bineesh & W. T. White, 2012
- Liopropoma rubre Poey, 1861 (Peppermint bass)
- Liopropoma santi Baldwin & D. R. Robertson, 2014 (Spot-tail golden bass)
- Liopropoma susumi D. S. Jordan & Seale, 1906 (Meteor perch)
- Liopropoma swalesi Fowler & B. A. Bean, 1930 (Swales's basslet)
- Liopropoma tonstrinum J. E. Randall & L. R. Taylor, 1988 (Redstriped basslet)

== Taxonomy ==
Phylogenetic studies have suggested that the western Atlantic species within the tribe Liopropomini, including the genus Bathyanthias, form a monophyletic group with respect to the Indo-Pacific species currently classified as being within this genus. This further suggests that Bathyanthias is nested within Liopropoma, these studies indicate that more research is needed into the limits of the genus Liopropoma.
