= Pardaxin =

Type of peptide

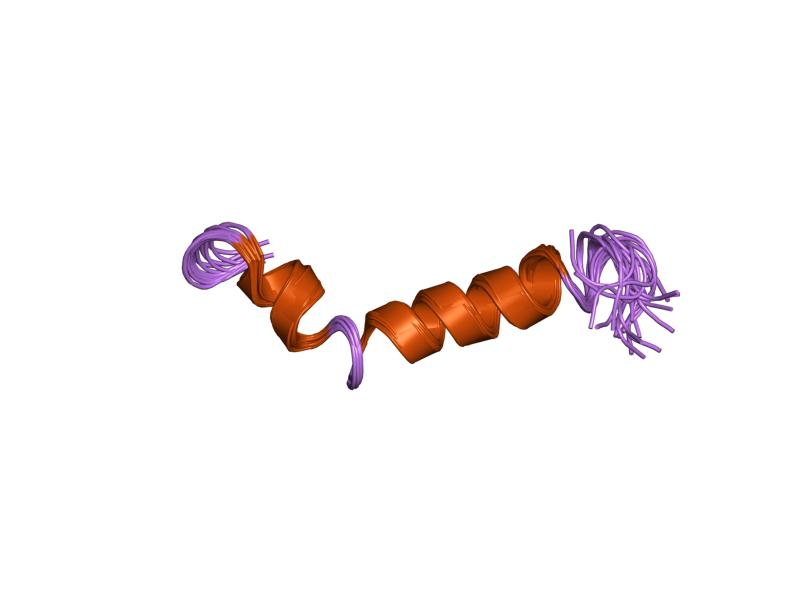
- twenty lowest energy structures of pa4 by solution nmr

Identifiers
- Symbol: Pardaxin
- Pfam: PF07425
- InterPro: IPR009990
- TCDB: 1.A.66
- OPM superfamily: 208
- OPM protein: 1xc0
Available protein structures:
- PDB: IPR009990 PF07425 (ECOD; PDBsum)
- AlphaFold: IPR009990; PF07425

Pardaxin is a peptide produced by the Red Sea sole (P4, P5) and the Pacific Peacock sole (P1, P2, P3) that is used as a shark repellent. It causes lysis of mammalian and bacterial cells, similar to melittin.

Amino acid alignment of pardaxins. Variable residues are bold-faced.

== Synthesis ==
In the lab, pardaxin is synthesized using an automated peptide synthesizer. Alternatively, the secretions of the Red Sea sole can be collected and purified.

== Functions ==
=== Antibacterial peptide ===
Pardaxin has a helix-hinge-helix structure. This structure is common in peptides that act selectively on bacterial membranes and cytotoxic peptides that lyse mammalian and bacterial cells. Pardaxin shows a significantly lower hemolytic activity towards human red blood cells compared to melittin. The C-terminal tail of pardaxin is responsible for this non-selective activity against the erythrocytes and bacteria. The amphiphilic C-terminal helix is the ion-channel lining segment of the peptide. The N-terminal α-helix is important for the insertion of the peptide to the lipid bilayer of the cell.

The mechanism of pardaxin is dependent on the membrane composition. Pardaxin significantly disrupts lipid bilayers composed of zwitterionic lipids, especially those composed of 1-palmitoyl-2-oleoyl-phosphatidylcholine (POPC). This suggests a carpet mechanism for cell lysis. The carpet mechanism is when a high density of peptides accumulates on the target membrane surface. The phospholipid displacement changes in fluidity, and the cellular contents leak out. The presence of anionic lipids or cholesterol was found to reduce the peptide's ability to disrupt bilayers.

=== Shark repellent ===
P. marmoratas and P. pavoninus release pardaxin when threatened by sharks. Pardaxin targets the gills and pharyngeal cavity of the sharks. It results in severe struggling, mouth paralysis, and temporary increase of urea leakage in the gills. This distress is caused by the attack of the cellular membrane of the gills, which causes a large influx of salt ions. Research into creating a commercial shark repellent using pardaxin was discontinued because it dilutes in the water too quickly. It is only effective if sprayed almost directly into a shark's mouth.

=== Cancer treatment ===
Pardaxin inhibits proliferation and induces apoptosis of human cancer cell lines. Its 33-amino acid structure contains many cationic and amphipathic amino acids. This makes it easier for it to interact with anionic membranes, such as those in tumor cells, which are inherently more acidic because of the acidic environment created by more glycolysis.

Pardaxin initiates caspase-dependent and caspase-independent apoptosis in human cervical carcinoma cells. Pardaxin triggers reactive oxygen species (ROS). ROS production disrupts protein folding and induces the unfolded protein response (UPR). This causes stress on the endoplasmic reticulum, which releases calcium. This leads to an increase in mitochondrial calcium, dropping its membrane potential. The pore permeability changes, and Cytochrome c (Cyt c) is released. Cyt c activates the caspase chain that leads to apoptosis. ROS also activates the JNK pathway. JNK is phosphorylated, which leads to the phosphorylation of AP-1 (transcription factor consisting of cFOS and Cjun). This results in the activation of caspases as well. ROS also causes a caspase independent pathway that results in apoptosis. When the mitochondrial membrane potential changes, apoptosis-inducing factors (AIFs) are also released. These trigger apoptosis when they enter the nucleus, not needing to involve caspases.
