= Grammistin =

Grammistins are peptide toxins synthesised by glands in the skin of soapfishes of the tribes Grammistini and Diploprionini which are both classified within the grouper subfamily Epinephelinae, a part of the family Serranidae. Grammistin has a hemolytic and ichthyotoxic action. The grammistins have secondary structures and biological effects comparable to other classes of peptide toxins, melittin from the bee stings and pardaxins which are secreted in the skin of two sole species. A similar toxin has been found to be secreted in the skin of some clingfishes.

Grammistins have a distinctive bitter taste. Soapfishes increase the amount of toxin released in their skin if they are stressed and other species of fish kept in a confined space with a stressed soapfish normally die. If ingested at a high enough dosage the toxin is lethal to mammals with some symptoms being similar to those produce by ciguatoxins. Grammistins also cause hemolysis of mammalian blood cells. The main purpose of the secretion of grammastin is defensive and when a lionfish (Pterois miles) tries to predate on a soapfish it immediately ejects it from its mouth, suggesting that it had detected the bitter taste. Grammistins affect organisms by cytolysis and hemolysis. As well as being toxic they are also antibiotic and antimicrobial.
