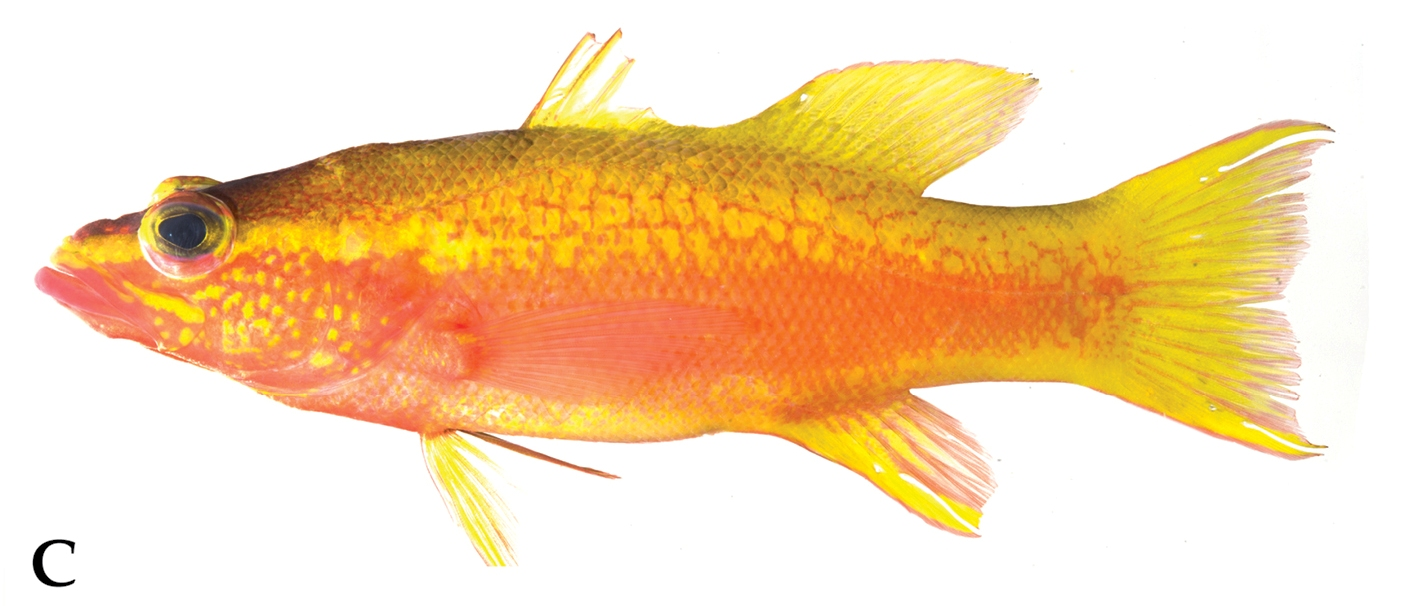
- Liopropoma aberrans
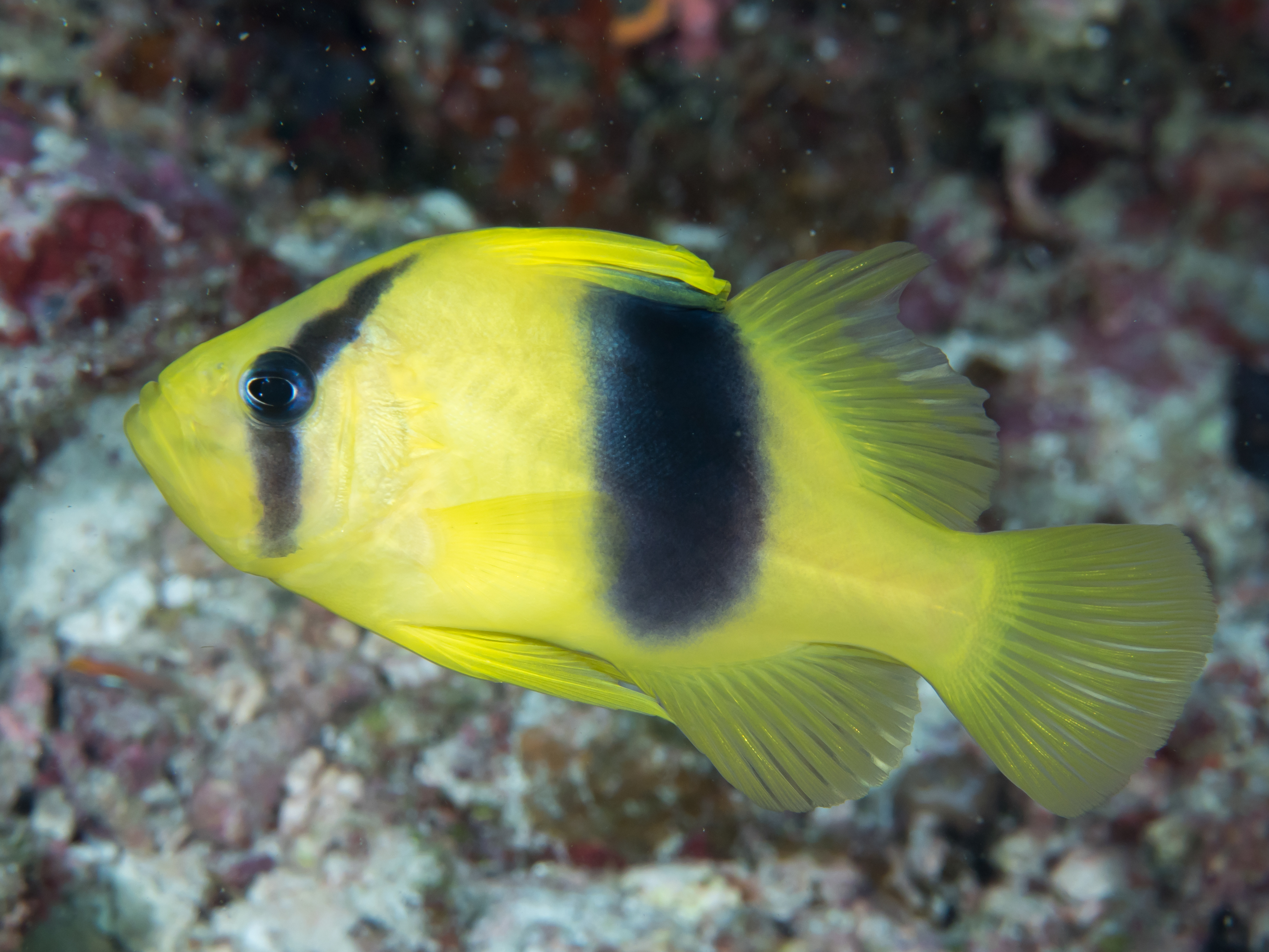
- Barred soapfish (Diploprion bifasciatum)

Scientific classification
- Kingdom: Animalia
- Phylum: Chordata
- Class: Actinopterygii
- Order: Perciformes
- Suborder: Percoidei
- Family: Liopropomatidae; Poey, 1867

Genera
- See text

= Liopropomatidae =

Family of marine fishes

Liopropomatidae, the painted basslets, are a family of marine perciform fish. They are found mainly in the Indo-Pacific region and in the Western Atlantic Ocean with a single species in the eastern Atlantic. There are two subfamilies: Liopropomatinae, and Diploprioninae (the barred soapfishes). Like the soapfishes of Grammistidae, the Diploprioninae are known to secret the mucus-like toxin grammistin.

They were formerly considered a tribe in the subfamily Epinephelinae, the group including the groupers.

== Genera ==
The following genera are included within the Liopropomatidae:

- Family Liopropomatidae
  - Subfamily Liopropomatinae Poey, 1867
    - Bathyanthias Günther, 1880
    - Liopropoma Gill, 1861
    - Rainfordia McCulloch, 1923
  - Subfamily Diploprioninae Bleeker, 1874 (barred soapfishes)
    - Aulacocephalus Temminck & Schlegel, 1843
    - Belonoperca Fowler & B.A. Bean, 1930
    - Diploprion Cuvier, 1828
